= Gwendolyn Zoharah Simmons =

American activist and retired academic (born 1944)

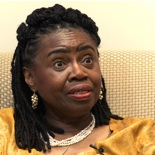
- Born: August 9, 1944; Memphis, Tennessee, U.S.
- Education: Antioch University, B.A. Temple University, M.A., Ph.D
- Occupation: Senior Lecturer Emerita
- Organization(s): University of Florida, retired 2019

Gwendolyn Zoharah Simmons (born August 9, 1944, as Gwendolyn Robinson) is an American activist and retired academic. She is senior lecturer emerita at the University of Florida since her retirement in 2019. Her research has explored Islamic feminism and the impact of Sharia law on Muslim women. She is a civil rights activist who served as a member of both the Student Nonviolent Coordinating Committee (SNCC) and the Nation of Islam (NOI).

She received a number of prestigious fellowships, including a Fulbright Fellowship, USAID Fellowships, and an American Center of Oriental Research Fellowship.

== Early life and education ==
Gwendolyn Robinson was born in 1944 in Memphis, Tennessee, where she was raised by her Baptist grandmother (who had been a sharecropper and whose own mother had been a slave), Robinson was raised with the knowledge of her family history and the ways in which it was affected by slavery and its legacies. Her family valued and encouraged her to pursue education, and she became the first in her family to attend college.

Simmons enrolled at Spelman College in 1962. Soon after she began classes, she was summoned by the dean of students, who deemed her natural hair to be an "embarrassment" to the school and its expectations that students be "well-groomed." This would become one of several disputes Simmons experienced with the Spelman administration as her involvement with student activism began to increase. In 1989, Simmons completed her B.A. at Antioch University, where she studied Human Services. She went on to study at Temple University, receiving an M.A. and a Ph.D. in religion with a focus on Islam, and a Graduate Certificate in Women's Studies. She wrote her dissertation on "The Contemporary Impact of Shari'ah Law on Women's Lives in Jordan and Palestine."

=== Student activism ===
Gwendolyn Robinson was inspired to get involved in the civil rights movement by two of her professors, Staughton Lynd and Esta Seaton. She began volunteering at the nearby Student Nonviolent Coordinating Committee (SNCC) headquarters alongside SNCC chair John Lewis, SNCC executive secretary James Forman, and fellow Spelman student Ruby Doris Smith-Robinson. She was careful to participate in office work only, where she was less likely to draw attention from her family and from the Spelman administration. She became involved with the Committee on Appeal for Human Rights early on during her time at Spelman.

In 1963, she successfully ran to become a Spelman representative to SNCC's coordinating committee. In early January 1964, she was arrested along with other Spelman students for participating in a lunch-counter demonstration at Lester Maddox's Pickrick restaurant. She spent a night in jail and was again summoned by the dean of students, who put her on academic probation for violating Spelman's prohibitions on civil rights demonstrations. She participated in another sit-in at a Krystal restaurant a few days later, where she was once again arrested. This time, she was rebuked by Spelman President Manley, and had her scholarship revoked. In light of these punitive measures, friends and fellow demonstrators throughout the Atlanta University Center rallied to Simmons' support, organizing a march to President Manley's house. As a consequence, Robinson was allowed to remain at Spelman but under strict probation. She continued taking classes during the spring of 1964, and she assisted Staughton Lynd in developing curriculum for the upcoming Mississippi Freedom Summer Project and preparing materials for the Mississippi Freedom Democratic Party.

Engaged by Freedom Summer materials, Robinson decided to spend the summer of 1964 volunteering with the Mississippi Freedom project. Spelman administrators informed Simmons' family of this decision, who feared for Simmons' safety in working in an area known for Ku Klux Klan violence. They acted decisively to prevent her from leaving, bringing her home and intercepting correspondence from SNCC. Through covert money transfers from SNCC, Simmons was finally able to travel to Mississippi, much to the dismay of her family. Despite this disapproval, she traveled to Oxford, Ohio for orientation, and then on to Mississippi. In Oxford, she served as project trainer, working with Staughton Lynd in his capacity as orientation director, as well as Vincent Harding.

In Mississippi, she was sent to the city of Laurel in Jones County, an area notorious for Klan violence. In this environment, Simmons feared for her life, regularly encountering hostility and police harassment. When her project director, Lester McKinney, was sent to jail, Simmons was appointed to replace him, despite her lack of field organizing experience. She became one of only seven female Freedom Summer project directors. Under Simmons' direction, Freedom Summer volunteers operated a Freedom School, opened a day care, registered voters, and established a library.

== Civil rights activism ==
=== 1964-1966 ===
At the end of Freedom Summer, Simmons decided to stay in Laurel rather than return to Spelman. While Simmons worked in Laurel, she stayed in the nearby city of Hattiesburg as Laurel was too dangerous to live in. She served as freedom school director of SNCC's Laurel, Mississippi project, providing curriculum development for freedom schools. As a young black female leader in SNCC, Simmons faced both racism and sexism. She reportedly feared sexual violence and created an anti-sexual harassment policy for the Laurel Project, which she named the "Amazon Project" the policy was one of the first of its kind in SNCC. It was during her time in Mississippi that Simmons began identifying as a feminist.

In 1965, after spending eighteen months in Laurel, she returned to Atlanta, psychologically scarred by the violence she had witnessed. She took a break from organizing and worked as a fundraiser in SNCC's New York City office.

A year later, she returned to activism in the South. In 1966, she was hired as co-director on the newly formed SNCC Atlanta Project alongside fellow SNCC activist Bill Ware in the Vine City neighborhood. The Atlanta Project was an early grassroots expression of Black Power, focusing its efforts on political mobilization and urban improvement. She continued her work with freedom school initiatives with the Project. Simmons used her time on the Atlanta Project to evaluate civil rights movement tactics and develop preliminary theories of Black Power. For instance, she helped draft the project's position paper on Black Power, which became controversial for its commentary on white members of SNCC.

Simmons harbored a number of frustrations with white SNCC organizers, whom she felt disrespected her authority and used up resources in being trained to work in black communities. She advocated for whites to work on racial justice issues in white communities, where they could work in parallel with black organizers. These stances, as expressed in the project's Black Power position paper, were controversial and not necessarily indicative of the views of SNCC leaders, including James Forman and head of research Jack Minnis. She joined black female SNCC activists in critiquing increasing interracial relationships between black men and white women, which were perceived as a rejection of black women.

In the late 1960s, Simmons left Atlanta for Philadelphia, where she spent twenty years working for the American Friends Service Committee. She also served as treasurer of the National Black Independent Party.

=== 1967-1972 ===
During her time in SNCC, Simmons first heard Malcolm X on a record and was instantly drawn to his message. She officially joined the Nation of Islam (NOI) in 1967 and converted to Islam.

While a member of the NOI, Simmons also served as Midwest region coordinator for the National Council of Negro Women (NCNW) while living in Chicago. From Chicago, Simmons and her husband, Michael Simmons, moved to New York, joining Minister Louis Farrakhan's Mosque No. 7.

In her reflections of her time spent with the NOI, Simmons expressed displeasure with the gender hierarchy that governed women's limited role in organizing:

"Unlike the SNCC, however, there was really no place for a woman to exercise what I considered real leadership as it had been in SNCC. As I was to learn later, my role as a woman in the NOI was to be a 'symbol of purity and chastity' and to be obedient and submissive to male authority, and the hallmark of my existence was that of mother of many children and a dutiful wife and helper to my husband, to whom I should defer in all matters of importance."

Simmons directly contravened NOI teachings in a number of ways, for instance, by using birth control despite the beliefs of NOI leader Elijah Muhammad, who viewed birth control as an attack on black families. She refrained from wearing the Muslim Girls Training uniform and headscarf, choosing not to complicate her organizing efforts with religious expression. Other criticisms Simmons expressed regarding the NOI concerned the emphasis on money that burdened poor members, the militaristic and gendered hierarchy, and the use of corporal punishments. She left the organization in 1972.

== Islamic feminist research and advocacy ==
Beginning in 1971, Simmons spent seventeen years as a disciple of Sufi Sheikh Muhammad Raheem Bawa Muhaiyaddeen, a renowned leader of Islamic mysticism. She received the name "Zoharah" from Muhaiyaddeen. She was one of his first American students, and she remains an active member of the Bawa Muhaiyaddeen Fellowship and Mosque.

As part of her work in academia, Simmons researched the contemporary impact of Sharia law on Muslim women in various communities, traveling to Jordan, Egypt, Palestine, and Syria. She also spent some time living in Amman, Jordan, in order to conduct research for her academic dissertation.

Her teaching at the University of Florida centered on race, gender, and religion, particularly on African American religious traditions and women's relationship with Islam. She sought to separate the religion of Islam with various cultural interpretations, sometimes looking to history for forgotten and dismissed interpretations. She has expressed concern over the ignorance in American Muslim communities of the Islamic feminist movement. She believes that Islamic feminism recalls the respect for women expressed in the Quran and the Prophet Muhammad's teachings that has been forgotten in more modern interpretations. Her writings address issues facing African Americans, such as teen pregnancy, as well as broader concerns related to Third World inequities.

== Personal life ==
Robinson formed a romantic relationship with Michael Simmons, a fellow Atlanta Project organizer, after recruiting him in 1965 to work on Julian Bond's campaign for a Georgia state legislature seat. The couple was required to marry upon joining the Nation of Islam in order to continue living together. They have one daughter, Aishah Shahidah Simmons, who is a feminist documentary filmmaker. Both Simmons and her daughter have been outspoken about Aishah's experiences with rape and incest.

== Writings ==
- "Striving for Muslim Women's Human Rights--Before and Beyond Beijing," Syracuse University Press (2000)
- "Racism in Higher Education," University of Florida Journal of Law and Public Policy (2002)
- "Are we up to the challenge? The need for a radical re-ordering of the Islamic discourse on women," Oneworld Publications (2003)
- "African American Islam as an Expression of Converts' Religious Faith and Nationalist Dreams and Ambitions," University of Texas Press (2006)
- "From Muslims in America to American Muslims," Journal of Islamic Law and Culture (2008)
- "Mama Told Me Not To Go," Pearson Prentice Hall (2008)
- "Martin Luther King Jr. Revisited: A Black Power Feminist Pays Homage to the King," Journal of Feminist Studies in Religion (2008)
- "From Little Memphis Girl to Mississippi Amazon," University of Illinois Press (2010)
