= McDew =

McDew is a surname. Notable people with the surname include:

- Charles McDew (1938–2018), American activist
- Darren W. McDew (born 1960), United States Air Force general
