= Casey Hayden =

American civil rights activist (1937–2023)

- Born: Sandra Cason; October 31, 1937; Austin, Texas, U.S.
- Died: January 4, 2023 (aged 85); Arizona, U.S.
- Education: Victoria College; University of Texas, Austin (BA)
- Occupation: Civil rights activist
- Movement: Students for a Democratic Society, Student Non-Violent Coordinating Committee, Mississippi Freedom Democratic Party

Sandra Cason Hayden (October 31, 1937 – January 4, 2023) was an American radical student activist and civil rights worker in the 1960s. Recognized for her defense of direct action in the struggle against racial segregation, in 1960 she was an early recruit to Students for a Democratic Society (SDS). With Student Nonviolent Coordinating Committee (SNCC) in Mississippi, Hayden was a strategist and organizer for the 1964 Freedom Summer. In the internal discussion that followed its uncertain outcome, she clashed with the SNCC national executive.

Hayden's vision was of a "radically democratic" movement driven by organizers in the field. In defending grassroots organization she believed she was also advocating for the voice of women. In "Sex and Caste" (November 1965), a reworking of an internal memo they had drafted with other SNCC women, Hayden and Mary King drew "parallels" with the experience of African-Americans to suggest that women are "caught up in a common-law caste system that operates, sometimes subtly, forcing them to work around or outside hierarchical structures of power." Since regarded as a bridge connecting civil rights to women's liberation, Hayden describes its publication as her "last action as a movement activist."

In the decades that followed, she continued to acknowledge the civil-rights struggle of the era as the forerunner for women, and for all those who have taken up "the idea of organising for themselves."

== Early life ==
Casey Hayden was born Sandra Cason (a name she continued to use legally) on October 31, 1937, in Austin, Texas, as a fourth-generation Texan. She was raised in Victoria, Texas, in a "multigenerational matriarchal family"—by her mother, Eula Weisiger Cason ("the only divorced woman in town"), her mother's sister, and her grandmother. An unconventional arrangement, she believed it cultivated in her from the outset an affinity for those on the margins.

== Campus activist ==
In 1957 Cason enrolled as junior at The University of Texas. She moved out of campus dorms into the Social Gospel and racially integrated Christian Faith and Life Community, and as officer of Young Women's Christian Association and member of the Social Action Committee of the university's Religious Council was soon engaged in civil-rights education and protest. Continuing from 1959 as a UT English and philosophy graduate student, she participated in a successful sit-in campaign to desegregate Austin-area restaurants and theaters.

In a dramatic intervention at the National Student Association convention in Minneapolis in August 1960, Cason turned back a broadly supported motion objecting to sit-ins that would have denied support to the fledgling Student Non-Violent Coordinating Committee (SNCC). "I cannot say to a person who suffers injustice, 'Wait,' And having decided that I cannot urge caution, I must stand with him." Among the delegates who, after a moments silence, gave her a standing ovation were SDS president Alan Haber, who, as she recalls, "scooped" her up, and Tom Hayden, editor of University of Michigan student newspaper. Stirred by her "ability to think morally [and] express herself poetically," he followed her into Haber's new left-wing grouping.

At the SNCC second coordinating conference in Atlanta in October 1960, Cason reported herself transfixed by the idea of the Beloved Community as espoused by James Lawson and Diane Nash of the Nashville Student Movement.

== With the SNCC in the South ==
External videos
- "Interview with Casey Hayden" conducted in 1986 for the Eyes on the Prize documentary in which she discusses Freedom Summer, civil rights activism in Mississippi, working with Bob Moses (activist), and as a member of SNCC.

In the summer of 1961 Cason moved to New York City and lived with Tom Hayden. In a ceremony invoking Albert Camus--"I, on the other hand, choose justice in order to remain faithful to the world"—they married in October, and then moved to Atlanta. "Godmother of the SNCC" Ella Baker had hired Cason (now Casey Hayden) for a YWCA special project, travelling to southern campuses to conduct integrated race-relations workshops (secretly in the case of some white schools). She also worked in the SNCC office on, among other projects, preparations for the Freedom Riders who were to challenge non-enforcement of the United States Supreme Court decision Boynton v. Virginia (1960). In December, as Freedom Riders themselves, the Haydens were arrested in Albany, Georgia.

It was from the jail cell that Tom Hayden began drafting what was to become the Port Huron Statement, adopted by the SDS at its convention in June 1962 in Ann Arbor, Michigan. With Tom Hayden elected SDS president for the 1962–1963 academic year, and Casey Hayden heeding the SNCC call to return to Atlanta, they separated, divorcing in 1965. While she had had the reputation in the SDS of being "one of the boys", much of the discussion within the SDS inner circle struck her as young men posturing. Her heart was with the SNCC where, consistent with the focus on action, greater value was placed on building relationships, and where women, Black women, spoke out.

In 1963, Casey Hayden moved to Mississippi where, along with Doris Derby, she was asked to begin a literacy project at Tougaloo College in an all-black community outside Jackson. The comparative safety of the college was a consideration: out in the field the increased visibility she brought as a white woman was a risk not only to herself, but also to her comrades. But it was also important to Hayden that the "request was specifically made" because of her background in English education:

As a Southerner, I considered the Southern Freedom Movement Against Segregation mine as much any one else's. I was working for my right to be with who I chose to be with as I chose to be with them. It was my freedom. However, when I worked full time in the black community I considered myself a guest of that community, which required decency and good manners, as every Southerner knows. I considered myself a support person; my appropriate role was to provide support from behind the lines, not to be a leader in any public way.

It was not that within SNCC she did not have a "right to leadership" but that "it would have been counterproductive." Not being "a leader in any public way," however, did not leave Hayden feeling in any way excluded. Although she appears quicker to recognize the advantage it was to her as a woman in the movement than to her as a "guest" in the community, Hayden noted that because of "the participatory, town-hall, consensus-forming nature of the SNCC operation" being "on the Executive Committee or a project director didn't carry much weight anyway." Her ability to make decisions and to control her own work was not a matter of formal position.

In 1964 she became organizer and strategist for Freedom Summer and for the Mississippi Freedom Democratic Party in the challenge they were to mount to the seating of the all-white regulars at the 1964 Democratic National Convention. She explains that in those roles:

I did the work all the way up and down. That means I did my own typing and mimeographing and mailing and I also did my own research and analysis and writing and decision making, the latter usually in conversation with other staff. As we said at the time, both about our constituencies and ourselves, "The people who do the work should make the decisions." There were no secretaries in SNCC, with the exception of Norma Collins in the Atlanta office, so there was no office hierarchy. I was at the center of the organization, unlimited except by my own choices and challenged at every turn to think and do and grow and care.

However, it is the recollection of Elaine DeLott Baker that when she joined Hayden in Jackson just the month before Freedom Summer, the era when "the beloved community" operated "in a space beyond race and gender" was already being spoken of with nostalgia.

There was a hierarchy in place that determined the definition of the "people" in the phrase, "Let the people decide". There was an unspoken understanding of who should speak up at meetings, who should propose ideas in public places, and who should remain silent. [It] was not the traditional hierarchy, it was a hierarchy based on considerations of race, the amount of time spent in the struggle, dangers suffered, and finally, of gender . . . —black men at the top of the hierarchy, then black women, followed by white men, and at the bottom, white women.

"Women, black and white," still retained "an enormous amount of operational freedom, they were indeed the ones that were keeping things moving." But as people began to debate the direction the movement should take "in the post-freedom summer reality," there was "little public recognition of that reality."

At the end of the summer, Hayden describes everyone in the movement "reeling from the violence," from the impact of "the new racial imbalance" following the influx of white-student volunteers, and from "the lack of direction and money." Most of all they were staggered to find the Democratic Party "in the role of racist lunch counter owner refusing entrance to the MFDP at the Atlantic City convention. The core of SNCC's work, voter registration, was open to question." As an opportunity to take stock, to critique and reevaluate the organization, a retreat in Waveland, Mississippi, was organized for November.

== "Sex and Caste" ==
Among the Position Papers circulated at Waveland, number 24 ("name withheld by request") opened with the observation that the "large committee" formed to present "crucial constitutional revisions" to the staff "was all men." Although Hayden and another Ella Baker YWCA protégé, Mary King, were soon outed as authors, a number of women in the Jackson office contributed to the drafting.

Elaine DeLott Baker recalls King, in her "organized style", summarizing the discussion, while Hayden, with her "impressive intellect and commitment," "helped us see how the feminist readings that fuelled our discussions related to our experiences as women in the movement." Hayden, for her part, remembers DeLott Baker writing the opening section ("a list of complaints about inequality of access to leadership on the part of women in SNCC"), and "as we thought about parallels between being black" of helping to draw this out. "Assumptions of male superiority," the paper proposed, "are as widespread and deep rooted and every much as crippling to the woman as the assumptions of white supremacy are to the Negro," so that many women, "give themselves up to that caricature of what a woman is-- unthinking, pliable, an ornament to please."

The paper was not the first time women had questioned their role within SNCC. In the spring of 1964, as planning for Freedom Summer was underway, a group of staffers had sat-in at James Forman's office in Atlanta. They were no longer prepared to accept that, with an equal stake in the organization's decision-making, as women all the mundane office and housekeeping tasks should fall to them: "No More Minutes Until Freedom Comes to the Atlanta Office" was Ruby Doris Smith-Robinson's placard. Like Mary King, Judy Richardson recalls the protest as being "half playful (Forman actually appearing supportive), although "the other thing was, we're not going to do this anymore." The same might have seemed true of the Waveland paper. With so many women "insensitive" to the "day-to-day discriminations" (who is asked to take minutes, who gets to clean Freedom House), the paper concluded that, "amidst the laughter," further discussion might be the best that could be hoped for.

Hayden insists that there was never a demand that the SNCC broaden its brief to "take women's roles on as an issue." Already "divided on many fronts" the movement, in her view, "had enough to do." Rather the "express purpose" in circulating the memo among SNCC women "was to create conversations among us about what mattered to us, strengthening the bonds between us which sustained us, and thus strengthening the movement from within." But while, in "the Waveland setting," Hayden regarded the entire intervention as "an aside," in the new year she began to see it in a more urgent light. Seeking to further "dialogue within the movement," Hayden drafted an extended paper, finalized a version with Mary King, and then circulated it to 40 other women of whom 29 (16 black women, 12 white women, and one Latina) had strong ties to SNCC.

Notwithstanding its subsequent reputation as a link between the Civil Rights Movement and the Women's Movement, and a "key text of second-wave feminism," in what she persisted in calling "A Kind of Memo" Hayden avoided the feminist language that she and her friends had learned from reading Simone de Beauvoir, Betty Friedan and Doris Lessing. Within "the framework of human rights and civil liberties at the time . . . women's rights had no meaning, indeed they did not exist." Instead she continued to rely on the movement's own rhetoric of race relations:

There seem to be many parallels that can be drawn between treatment of Negroes and treatment of women in our society as a whole. But in particular, women we've talked to who work in the movement seem to be caught up in a common-law caste system that operates, sometimes subtly, forcing them to work around or outside hierarchical structures of power which may exclude them. Women seem to be placed in the same position of assumed subordination in personal situations too. It is a caste system which, at its worst, uses and exploits women.

In November 1965, Hayden had the paper published in Liberation, the bi-monthly of the War Resisters League, the title Sex and Caste being suggested by the editor by David McReynolds. It was, Hayden has pointed out, her "last action as movement activist."

In the fall of 1965 Hayden had been in a difficult position. Like some other white SNCC veterans after Freedom Summer she "took a stab at white organizing." Officially on loan from the SNCC, Hayden worked with the SDS in Chicago organizing displaced Appalachian women into a welfare recipients union, a foot soldier in Tom Hayden's vision of an "interracial movement of the poor." It was hard and, because of male violence, at times dangerous. She realized it was "foolhardy" to organize women alone and on her own. She needed help, and this was motive for revisiting the original memo. She was also at a point at which it was clear that there was no going back to the SNCC she had known.

== Break with SNCC leadership ==
At an April 1965 SNCC Executive Committee meeting in Holly Springs, Mississippi, Hayden was labelled a "floater", a "derisive term for staff members who were viewed as too independent from the leadership structure." Although at times raucous, the reception of the paper on women may not have been the immediate issue. Hayden had authored, and owned to, another paper at Waveland the previous November, a "Memorandum on Structure".—her own contribution on the question of constitutional revision.

SNCC executive secretary James Forman had questioned Martin Luther King Jr.'s top-down leadership style at the Southern Christian Leadership Conference Yet by the close of 1964 he was increasingly insistent on the need within the SNCC for "structure." Hayden conceded that at this point "there was no way to make a decision." In the absence of a command structure "there was no regular communication between Atlanta and the organizers. We had been flying by the seat of our pants for years." Through the committee Forman put forward a plan for a decision making structure that "spoke to the structural needs of the Atlanta office." Bob Moses countered with a paper that "spoke to the structural needs of organizers."

Hayden's attempt, as she saw it, was "to get us through the impasse." She agreed the need for structure, "basically" Forman's, while seeking to maintain "both SNCC's central allegiance to programmatic control by organizers in the field and respect for the way we had organically developed, the ways we actually operated." Her plan went along with Forman's proposal to constitute the staff as the Coordinating Committee (the campus sit-in groups that comprised the original committee had largely evaporated in the move to voter registration). But she hedged it round with various sub-committees and provisos to ensure that "leadership for all our programs" would continue to be driven from the field and not from central office "which makes many program areas responsible to one person rather than to all of us."

This still suggested too loose, too confederal a structure for the party-political direction on which Forman and others were now travelling. At first this was toward the project of a Southwide Freedom Summer that, independent of the manpower and publicity of white volunteers, would build a "Black Belt political party" that could write its "own voting bill." Later, and after a decision in 1966 to organize embattled ghettos in the North, it was toward a coast-to-coast "Black United Front". This was to be forged through a merger (from which Forman and the majority did, ultimately, pull back) with the Black Panthers: Stokely Carmichael as "Prime Minister", James Forman as "Foreign Minister". Hayden had couched her proposals in gender-neutral terms, but she did believe that it was in a grassroots organization that women's voices would be most influential. Whether or not it was uppermost in her mind at the time, she later reflected that "patriarchy was an issue."

At her last SNCC meeting in November 1965, Hayden, "at dinner," told both Forman and Chairman John Lewis that the "imbalance of power in SNCC" was such that they would both need to step down if the movement was to remain "radically democratic." In the meeting itself, her notes record that Hayden did not speak in defense of her position that a "looser structure" was not "'no structure,' but [a] different structure" because, she concluded, "no one would have listened."

== Reflections ==
In 1986, Casey Hayden was interviewed with regard to Freedom Summer by researchers for the PBS television series Eyes on the Prize. She was not asked about the issues raised by Sex and Caste but was pressed on black-white division within the SNCC Mississippi operation, particularly in the light of calls for Black Power and black separatism. She allowed that there was an understandable degree of frustration, even resentment, felt by the local black staff, "the backbone" of the project, in having to deal "with a lot of young white people who were intellectual and moneyed." Calls for Black Power only came later, after Freedom Summer, and were in great measure a reaction, she believed, to continued political exclusion, something which the refusal to accredit the MFDP at the Democratic convention had dramatically symbolized: "it was like, if you won't let us in, we'll do our own thing."

Division of any kind, however, was not her abiding memory of the movement. Rather it was the feeling of being "part of a visionary community which really transcended race and really was integrated," and whose later dissipation continued to be felt as "a great loss." It was also "a lot of fun." "We were all out there doing whatever we thought up to do. We were totally self-directed people, and very few people have that experience."

The "direction" travelled with the movement in the South "put a lot of people in touch with themselves and the idea of organizing for themselves, so it spun off into anti-war organizing, and women's organizing and so on." There was also what Hayden called "the long suits of the black community in the South," the "patience and spirituality." This was something she believed northern black intellectuals tried to "tap into" and that she felt she and others also "picked up on."

== Later years ==
After 1965 Hayden worked for the New York Department of Welfare for a couple of years before moving to a rural Vermont commune with some other Mississippi veterans. She studied Zen Buddhism, was active in the home birth movement, and had two children with Donald Campbell Boyce III, a "yogi carpenter" who helped Hayden and others establish the Integral Yoga Institute of San Francisco in 1970. In 1981, Hayden was back in Atlanta working for the voter-education, voter-registration Southern Regional Council. Later, she worked in the mayoral administration of Martin Luther King Jr.'s former lieutenant, Andrew Young, as an administrative aide in the Department of Parks, Recreation and Culture.

In 1994 she married her partner Paul Buckwalter (1934–2016), with whom, in Tucson Arizona, she had care of seven stepchildren. A veteran of the 1968 Poor People's March on Washington and of community organizing with the Industrial Areas Foundation, Buckwalter was an Episcopalian priest and a leader in the Sanctuary movement. In 2010 Hayden spoke out against Arizona SB 1070, a state measure that criminalizes the movement by outlawing the shelter and transport illegal immigrants. It was "the most obvious example," she commented, of "Fortress America, the right wing's answer to the real issues we all face: 'We've got it and we are keeping it and we'll shoot you if you try to get any of it.'"

Hayden died in Arizona on January 4, 2023, at the age of 85. She was survived by her son Donald Campbell Boyce IV of Tucson, her daughter Rosemary Lotus Boyce of Los Angeles, and her sister, Karen Beams Hanys of Porter, Texas.

== Papers ==
Casey Hayden's civil-rights era papers are curated by the Dolph Briscoe Center for American History at the University of Texas at Austin.
