= Oretha Castle Haley =

American civil rights activist

- Haley, c. 1975
- Born: July 22, 1939; Oakland, Tennessee, U.S.
- Died: October 10, 1987 (aged 48); New Orleans, Louisiana, U.S.
- Education: Southern University of New Orleans
- Occupations: Civil rights activist, hospital administrator
- Organization(s): Congress of Racial Equality, National Association for the Advancement of Colored People, Freedom Riders
- Spouse: Richard Haley
- Children: 4

Oretha Castle Haley (July 22, 1939 – October 10, 1987) was an American civil rights activist in New Orleans where she challenged the segregation of facilities and promoted voter registration. She came from a working-class background, yet was able to enroll in the Southern University of New Orleans, SUNO, then a center of student activism. She joined the protest marches and went on to become a prominent activist in the Civil Rights Movement. Her home in Orleans Parish was added to the National Register of Historic Places in 2023.

== Background ==
The 1954 US Supreme Court decision, Brown v. Board of Education, undermined the legal foundation of separate-but-equal racial segregation. The landmark court decision emboldened the cause for civil rights. The 1955 murder of Emmett Till in Mississippi, and the subsequent miscarriage of justice drew national attention to the brutal and unfair treatment of African Americans in the South. In late 1955, the arrest of Rosa Parks led to the Montgomery Bus Boycott. The boycott lasted almost a year and its success launched the career of Martin Luther King and demonstrated the power of non-violent political action.

The first protest marches Oretha Castle participated in were sponsored by the Consumers League of Greater New Orleans (CLGNO). When Castle and several fellow protesters sought support to stage sit-ins at segregated lunch counters, both the Consumers League and the National Association for the Advancement of Colored People (NAACP) took no interest. The CLGNO and NAACP were involved in sensitive litigations and negotiations and shunned the publicity. In the summer of 1960, Oretha Castle, Rudy Lombard and Jerome Smith pioneered their own organization and sought sponsorship from a national organization. The Southern Christian Leadership Conference, SCLC, was not active in New Orleans. The Congress of Racial Equality (CORE) was the first activist group dedicated to non-violence founded in 1942 and based in Chicago. The newly formed Student Nonviolent Coordinating Committee (SNCC) rapidly grew in prominence. SNCC's powerbase included the Nashville Student Movement founded by Diane Nash, John Lewis, James Bevel, and Bernard Lafayette. Castle and her cohorts chose to ally their local group with CORE, and developed their power base in New Orleans. SNCC and CORE both concentrated on street-level, direct-action activism, and are often compared. The NAACP, SLC, CORE and SNCC cooperated in many endeavors, and each are credited with playing a major role in the success of the Civil Rights Movement.

== Lombard vs. Louisiana ==
On September 17, 1960, Castle and three of her fellow student-protesters were arrested for sitting in at the counter of McCrory's, a Canal Street five-and-dime store in New Orleans. These protests were based on how stores in Central City "wouldn't hire black sales clerks or cashiers, in spite of the fact that the majority of customers in the shopping district were black". Oretha Castle, Cecil Carter, Sydney Goldfinch and Rudy Lombard were charged with criminal mischief, "which makes it a crime to refuse to leave a place of business after being ordered to do so by the person in charge of the premises". There were no laws particularly allowing racial segregation in businesses in the town, however public announcements explaining a zero tolerance on sit-in demonstrations by the Mayor and Superintendent of the police had been made. Those charged were sentenced to a $350 fine and 60 days in prison, or if the fine could not be paid 120 days in prison.

This case first went to Louisiana State Trial Court. The case was appealed by CORE attorneys to the Louisiana State Supreme Court, which upheld the conservative decision of the Trial Court.

The case was appealed and brought to the US Supreme Court. The USSC, headed by Chief Justice Earl Warren, overturned the ruling in an eight to one decision on May 20, 1963. In the opinion to the court Justice Warren indicated that due to the announcements made by public officials, restaurant owners had felt compelled to maintain segregated facilities even if it was not their will or official law. As a result, the court overturned the Trial Court and Louisiana State Supreme Court decisions. Furthermore, the court cited violations to the 14th amendment as grounds for their decision.

== CORE and the Freedom Rides ==
In 1961, CORE pioneered the Freedom Rides, a novel method of non-violent protest against segregation in interstate transportation. SNCC played a major role. Trained and committed volunteers boarded Greyhound and Trailways buses in Washington DC and other northern cities, and headed south. At various stops, they occupied the whites-only waiting rooms to draw attention to the segregated facilities. The Freedom Rides were scheduled to finish in New Orleans. The first Freedom Riders drew national attention in mid-May. Two buses left from Atlanta, GA heading for Birmingham, AL. The first bus was commandeered by an angry mob in Anniston, AL. The passengers were beaten and the bus was set ablaze. The second group of Freedom Riders made it to Birmingham where they were beaten by a waiting mob as local police stood by.

As head of the New Orleans chapter of CORE, Oretha Castle's home served as the New Orleans headquarters for the Freedom Riders. With help from Oretha's mother Virgie and sister Doris, their home housed and fed hundreds of Freedom Riders coming and going throughout the summer. New Orleans CORE sponsored several Freedom Rides through Louisiana and Mississippi. When two Freedom Riders were beaten in New Orleans in early August, CORE staged a demonstration at Police Headquarters. Oretha Castle was one of fifteen arrested. Attorney General Robert F. Kennedy was delegated the task of solving the problem. He petitioned and pressured the Interstate Commerce Commission, ICC, and finally on November 1, the "whites only" signs were removed. The success of the Freedom Rides raised the profile and bolstered the reputation of CORE.

Toward the end of 1961 Rudy Lombard departed, and Oretha Castle was appointed president of the local chapter of CORE. A prominent fellow activist characterized her as "the guiding force . . . the backbone . . . a woman of extraordinary capabilities." With its new notoriety, the New Orleans chapter of CORE attracted a growing membership. James Farmer had founded CORE to be an interracial organization. In 1962, Castle and her African American cohorts began to the question the participation of whites in their organization. Whites were assuming leadership roles in an organization dedicated to empowering blacks. Castle suspended the white members and came into conflict with the national organization. The national office dispatched Richard Haley to resolve the issue. The suspensions were declared invalid, whites slowly rejoined, yet the chapter never fully regained the members it lost. Haley remained with the organization for the next five years. Castle and Haley married in 1967, and had two sons, in addition to the two sons Oretha was already raising.

In 1963 and 1964, nightly marches targeting segregated stores, hotels, theaters and an amusement park continued. The Schwegmann's grocery store chain closed its lunch counters in response to a CORE lawsuit. A Freedom March on city hall resulted in the desegregation of the municipal cafeteria. The 1964 Civil Rights Act prohibited segregation in public accommodations, so the protest marches came to an end. The next battle was voter registration. CORE joined a coalition of civil rights organizations that combined their resources for the Freedom Summer project, what became known as Freedom Summer. In the spring of 1964, Castle relinquished her presidency and moved upstate to Ouchita Parish to act as field secretary. In November, she was promoted to field secretary for all of northern Louisiana. For more than a year, Castle applied the protest techniques she had helped to develop in Monroe, Jonesboro and Bogalusa, Louisiana. Freedom Summer accomplished its goal when the 1965 Voting Rights Act prohibited racial discrimination in voting.

== After 1965 ==
Bayard Rustin and James Farmer pioneered the use of non-violent civil disobedience in the United States inspired by Gandhi and other writers. For almost ten years, non-violent methods led to the many triumphs of the Civil Rights Movement culminating with the March from Selma to Montgomery in March 1965. In August, the Watts Rebellion initiated three consecutive summers of urban rebellions. Many activists questioned their faith in non-violence, including Oretha Castle. Disenchanted by Selma and other unsuccessful strategies, the Black Panther party emerged. Stokely Carmichael (later known as Kwame Ture) and Charles V. Hamilton wrote the book, Black Power: The Politics of Liberation (1967), encouraging self-determination for black communities. CORE fractured in a dispute over criticizing the Viet Nam War, and many long-time leaders left the organization. The original members of the New Orleans chapter of CORE all quit by 1965, including Oretha Castle. CORE, led by Roy Innis, is still active in New York.

Castle returned to New Orleans in 1966 and re-enrolled at SUNO to complete her degree. Her grass-roots organizational experience qualified her to take the lead in several organizations sponsored by the Federal War on Poverty. She led a successful campaign to desegregate public playgrounds. In 1971, she led the election campaign of Dorothy Mae Taylor, who became the first African-American woman state legislator in Louisiana. In the 1980s, she served as deputy administrator of Charity Hospital where she instituted several reforms. While there, she was central in creating the Sickle Cell Anemia Foundation. Oretha remained married to Richard Haley until her death, caused by cancer, in 1987 at the age of 48.

== Legacy ==
In 1989, the first eight blocks of Dryades Street in Central City, New Orleans, was renamed Oretha Castle Haley Boulevard. The Central City area and Dryades Street in particular were long the center of a culturally diverse business center in New Orleans. During the turn into the 20th century the area hosted many Jewish, Italian, African-American and German businesses. The area also served black musicians, and black baseball players during the Jim Crow era. Eventually Dryades Street became a focal point for the civil rights movement when Castle Haley and her contemporaries boycotted during the 1960s. After the boycotts many businesses did close, a great deal of commercial activity ceased and was in poor condition for the '60s, '70s, and '80s. In 1989 the city used the naming of the street as a way to "revitalize the area".

In 2015, an exhibit called 'Oretha Castle Haley Boulevard: Past, Present and Future' opened, aiming to explore the "rich history and gentrification" of the area. In 2017 her namesake street won "The Great American Main Street Award".
