= Jack Minnis =

American civil rights activist

Jack Minnis (1926–2005) was an American activist, and the founder and director of opposition research for the Student Nonviolent Coordinating Committee in the Civil Rights Movement era. Minnis researched federal expenditures and state and local subversion of racial equality. Minnis was white, but remained affiliated with SNCC even after it adopted a "blacks only" personnel policy, its only white employee for a long time. He helped to train such workers as Stokely Carmichael, Marion Barry, and John Lewis.

Minnis had been hired by the Southern Regional Council to evaluate their Voter Education Project, which included voter registration efforts in the South in 1962. Minnis was fired for what he later said were justifiable political reasons, and suggested that SNCC start its own research unit to aid its activist effort. Jack Minnis ran SNCC's research department out of the Atlanta office, but traveled widely in the South to assist local efforts to register voters. By 1965, Minnis was producing a weekly mimeographed opposition research-based newsletter, Life in the Great Society with Lyndon, which made public some of the activities of President Lyndon B. Johnson that were not covered by the mainstream media. These weekly reports played a significant role in the radicalization of SNCC, the Southern Christian Leadership Conference, and CORE field staff.

Minnis watched closely the movement of federal money toward corporate interests; he remarked on such various incidents as Johnson's appointment of a Merck policymaker to a board that would determine Merck's culpability for false claims with its Sucrets coughdrop product, and an Agency for International Development project that was possibly a front for CIA activity.

Once the Civil Rights Act became law in 1964, Minnis monitored its enforcement and found the Johnson administration's work to be "shoddy" in desegregating schools and hospitals. He also pointed out that there were still laws on the books in many states that prevented black from being jurors. Minnis kept a substantial file on the activities of the White Citizens Council in the "black belt" states in the South, and conducted research in standard reference works such as Moody's Manuals, Standard and Poor's Registry, and census data to link prominent white citizens in the South to white violence and anti-labor activities. He organized his files for quick access, and made information available to groups sympathetic to SNCC's objectives. Minnis discovered a little-known loophole in Alabama law that enabled blacks in Lowndes County to form an independent party and run for office without navigating the traditional local two-party systems. His activities and writings were monitored by the Mississippi State Sovereignty Commission, a state-run segregationist surveillance unit directed by the governor that enlisted and paid ordinary citizens to report "suspicious" activity. Minnis's movements in the South were tracked with the aid of state police in several states who telexed his license plate numbers to law enforcement in towns where Minnis conducted workshops on how to register to vote, how to run for office, and other normal citizenship activities. The Sovereignty Commission's files on Minnis contain 88 items.

Minnis had a profound influence on journalists of the Civil Rights Movement, and journalists who later documented the movement. Judy Richardson, who produced the documentary Eyes on the Prize said, "Whenever I speak on campuses about SNCC, I talk about Minnis...about SNCC's research department and Jack: He was this crusty older white guy who smoked like a fiend, looked generally unkempt, and could get research from a turnip. He was always finding information --like buried treasure --that would make all the difference... the way Minnis organized material had affected me.. . Minnis's chronology was invaluable in helping northern journalists understand the extent of what we were dealing with."
