= Ralph Featherstone =

American political activist

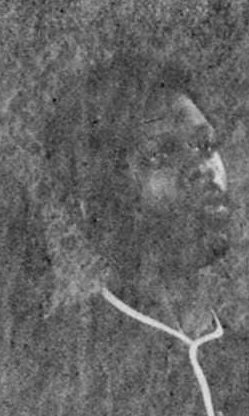

Ralph Featherstone (May 26, 1939 – March 9, 1970) was an American political activist with the Student Nonviolent Coordinating Committee.

== Biography ==
Featherstone was born in Washington, D.C. in 1939.

After graduating from Washington D.C.’s Teacher College, Featherstone was sent by the SNCC to Philadelphia, Mississippi, where he participated in the 1964 Freedom Summer. In McComb, Mississippi, he established a "Freedom School" as an alternative to the segregated state schools, and taught classes there. He later went to Selma, Alabama, where he was arrested and subsequently taught classes in the local jail.

During his time in Mississippi, Featherstone was romantically involved with Chude Pam Allen, a white Freedom Summer organizer.

In the summer of 1966, Featherstone and Howard Zinn traveled to Japan to deliver lectures against American involvement in the war in Vietnam. In 1967, he traveled to Cuba.

In 1967, Featherstone became program secretary of the Student Nonviolent Coordinating Committee. That October, he attended a convention in New Mexico hosted by the Alianza Federal de Mercedes, which advocated for land rights for Hispano New Mexicans.

Featherstone in his role with the SNCC supported the Palestinian cause, saying, "Israel is and always has been the tool and foothold for American and British exploiters in the Middle East and Africa." He defended a 1967 SNCC publication after the Six-Day War which tied the struggle for black civil rights in the United States with the Palestinian struggle for self-determination.

In 1968, Featherstone, along with associates in the SNCC, established the Drum & Spear bookstore in Washington, D.C., which featured works by black authors.

In February 1970, Featherstone married fellow civil rights activist Charlotte Orange.

== Death ==
On March 9, 1970, while traveling with fellow SNCC staffer William "Che" Payne to the trial of H. Rap Brown, Featherstone was killed by a bomb along U.S. Route 1 in Bel Air, Maryland. The pair were to be responsible for safely transporting Brown to his trial. The bomb exploded from the front floorboard of their car, killing both occupants. SNCC opponents and the police alleged the bomb was deliberately planted by supporters of H. Rap Brown before his trial and accidentally exploded. Supporters of Brown alleged assassination by local white supremacists, and cited the FBI's COINTELPRO program as evidence of right-wing collusion. According to a statement published by the Spear of the Nation newsletter and approved by Featherstone's widow, Charlotte, the bombing was a political assassination intended for Brown. The newsletter claimed, "During the night an explosive bomb was placed in their car. Shortly before midnight the bomb exploded, and Ralph and Che were killed instantly...These killings were a political act directed to black people everywhere."

Featherstone's ashes were flown to Lagos, Nigeria, where they were buried in a Yoruba ceremony attended by 10,000 people.
