= Charles McDew =

American civil rights activist (1938–2018)

Charles "Chuck" McDew
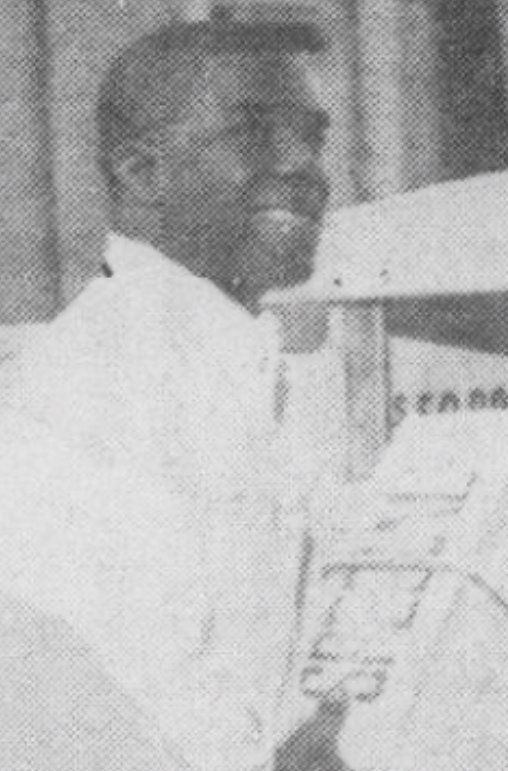
- McDew in a 1962 publication of The Atlanta Inquirer

2nd Chairman of the Student Nonviolent Coordinating Committee
- In office 1961–1963
- Preceded by: Marion Barry
- Succeeded by: John Lewis

Personal details
- Born: Charles Frederick McDew; June 23, 1938 Massillon, Ohio
- Died: April 3, 2018 (aged 79) West Newton, Massachusetts
- Education: South Carolina State College
- Occupation: Professor
- Known for: Civil Rights Movement

Charles "Chuck" McDew (June 23, 1938 – April 3, 2018) was an American civil rights activist. After attending South Carolina State University in Orangeburg, South Carolina, he became the chairman of the Student Nonviolent Coordinating Committee (SNCC) from 1960 to 1963. His involvement in the movement earned McDew the title, "black by birth, a Jew by choice and a revolutionary by necessity" stated by fellow SNCC activist Bob Moses.

== Life ==
Charles Frederick McDew was born in Massillon, Ohio, on June 23, 1938, to Eva (née Stephens) and James McDew. He was one of five children. Mcdew's mother worked as a nurse and his father, who had been a chemistry teacher in South Carolina, had become a steel worker after Ohio schools refused to hire him. According to McDew's autobiography, he believed that his birth date was notable because he was born on the day that boxer Joe Louis defeated Max Schmeling for the heavyweight championship of the world. McDew was convinced by his elders that he was destined to do something great or good for the "Negro" race. McDew also referred to himself as a "race baby", an ideal that had never been defined to him by family members, but one that he believed he was expected to define for himself as his future unfolded. "I had a charge to do something for the race. It was never specified what I would do for the race, but it was expected that I would do something to help the colored race to move ahead".

McDew grew up in a family who talked little about the advancement of civil rights. Though there was little talk on that topic, McDew displayed his first example of community organizing when he was only in the eighth grade. Protesting the rights of religious freedom, McDew stood up by protesting against discrimination toward the Amish at the age of 13.

As he got older, McDew hoped to avoid going to work in the steel mills by winning a football scholarship to college. Due to an auto accident he was no longer able to play football so his father requested that McDew go to the South to experience his "own culture" to expand his ideas of what work he could do. Upon arrival at his father's alma mater, South Carolina State University, Charles thought that his father was "the most brilliant man alive". Never having seen so many "pretty black girls", McDew instantly knew he chose the right college.

== College ==
During his first Thanksgiving on campus, McDew decided to travel with his roommate, Charles Gatson, back to the area where Gatson had family because it would be cheaper than going back to Ohio and the schools closed during these holidays. During their vacation, the two of them, and some others, went to a party. McDew responsibly decided to be the designated driver, but on their way home, they were pulled over by a police officer. Not knowing how to address an officer in the South different than in the North, McDew answered the officer's questions with a bit too much sass. This led to the beating and first arrest of Charles McDew. The next day, McDew was on his way to the train station to head back to school The Jim Crow carriage for the black people was filled, so McDew sat down in the white carriage. Being told he was to go sit in the luggage carriage, he refused, which led to the second arrest of Charles McDew. The third arrest occurred when he and a fellow Massillon resident, Mike Hershberger, went to play handball at the YMCA in Columbia, S.C. They were arrested for attempting to integrate the Y.

The day he finally got back to South Carolina, McDew was walking to his dorm though a park. Being unfamiliar with segregation, the park McDew walked through happened to only be open to white people on this particular day, which led to another arrest.

These events were said to be the beginning of McDew's inspiration towards the Movement and McDew's general distaste for the Southern way of life.

== The Movement ==
In March 1960, not long after the first Greensboro sit-ins organized by students in North Carolina, McDew helped to lead a major protest against segregation in Orangeburg. Together with his co-leader Thomas Gaither, a student at Claflin College, McDew was one of some 1,000 students from South Carolina State University and Claflin who marched downtown to protest segregated stores. The marchers were brutally attacked by firemen and police officers, who turned firehoses on the students and arrested close to 400, confining many of them outdoors in a stockade used to hold cattle. McDew was among the marchers who was arrested.

The next month, McDew received a letter from Martin Luther King Jr. inviting him to a meeting at Shaw University in Raleigh, North Carolina to discuss the student sit ins, and as a representative for South Carolina State University, This meeting talked about student involvement all over the South, along with King trying to persuade everyone to join the SCLC. McDew did not want to join because he did not completely agree with the practice of nonviolence. Thinking of Mahatma Gandhi, McDew's reasoning was that if Gandhi tried the nonviolence method in Africa and was beaten, jailed, and ultimately run out of the country, how would this method work in the "most violent country in the world?"

Due to this disagreement, McDew and a few other students talked about creating a new group. This group would complement the already established SCLC, along with enforcing a few other beliefs. The students thought to call their new group the Student Coordinating Committee, but with a group of students from Nashville completely focused on nonviolence, they ultimately chose to include "Nonviolent" in the name. The students then proceeded to nominate Marion Barry as the first chairman.

During this time, SNCC and McDew wanted to focus on black voter registration. Feeling that the real value to the movement would ultimately be the black voters, McDew and the organization went on to promote registration in the "blackest" parts of the country. Thinking that if they could get people in, for example, Baker's County and Mississippi to register, then they could get anyone to register. Knowing that "violence was a part of the game", they could not let these areas of the country intimidate them because once these areas were registered, anywhere could get registered.

As the movement developed and grew, SNCC kept getting into trouble and people kept getting arrested. This is how the "Jail No Bail" tactic began. This was where activists would get arrested, refuse to pay their fines for 39 days, (they only had 40 days to post bail) and then on the 39th day post their bail. This was a way of protesting the illegal arrests they were suffering

McDew was elected because of his obvious drive for the movement. He remained SNCC's second chairman until 1963 and participated in many sit ins, arrests, protests thereafter. He, and eleven others, were once arrested for "disrupting racial harmony" and were placed into a cold Mississippi cell described as an "iceberg". Little food, no eating or drinking utensils, and some having to huddle for warmth. This arrest included, McDew was arrested 43 times.

He was also active in organizations for social and political change, working as a teacher and as a labor organizer, managing anti-poverty programs in Washington, D.C., "serving as community organizer and catalyst for change in Boston and San Francisco, as well as other communities".

== Personal life and death ==
McDew had converted to Judaism while in high school. This, along with the quote "If I am not for myself, who will be for me? If I am for myself only, what am I? If not now, when?" from the Talmud, is what led McDew to Judaism and McDew's moral "obligation" to fight for justice.

McDew died on April 3, 2018, aged 79, of a heart attack, while visiting his longtime partner in West Newton, Massachusetts. At the time of his death, he lived in St. Paul, Minnesota. He was retired from Metropolitan State University in Minneapolis, where he had taught classes in the history of the civil rights movement, African American history and classes in social and cultural awareness.
