= Judy Richardson =

American documentary filmmaker and civil rights activist

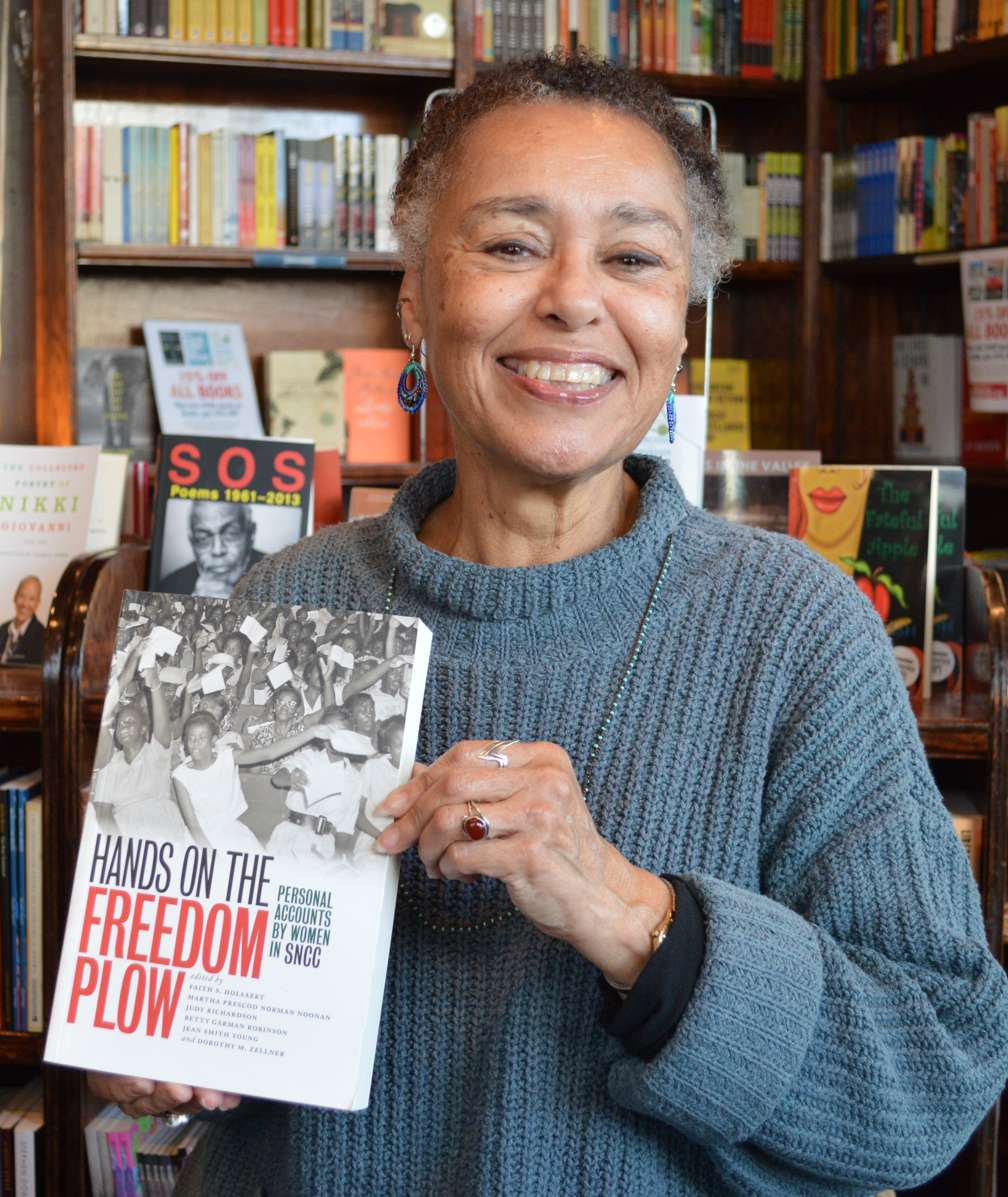
- Born: October 3, 1944 (age 82); Tarrytown, New York, U.S.
- Education: Swarthmore College; Antioch College
- Occupations: Activist, filmmaker
- Known for: Students for a Democratic Society, Student Nonviolent Coordinating Committee

Judy Richardson (born October 3, 1944) is an American documentary filmmaker and civil rights activist. She was Distinguished Visiting Lecturer of Africana Studies at Brown University.

== Early life and education ==
Richardson was born in Tarrytown, New York. She attended Washington Irving Jr. High. She then enrolled at Swarthmore College in Pennsylvania in 1962 on a full scholarship.

== Activism ==
During Richardson's freshman year at Swarthmore in 1962–1963, she joined the Swarthmore Political Action Committee (SPAC), a Students for a Democratic Society (SDS) affiliate.

Richardson was an early participant with the Student Nonviolent Coordinating Committee (SNCC) from 1963 to 1966. During her time with SNCC, Ella Baker was her mentor. In 1963, Richardson traveled on weekends, with other Swarthmore SPAC volunteers, to assist the Cambridge, Maryland community in desegregating public accommodations. The Cambridge Movement was led by Gloria Richardson with assistance from SNCC field secretaries, including Baltimore native Reggie Robinson. In 1963, Richardson joined a SNCC organized sit-in at a Toddle House in Atlanta. Richardson eventually joined the SNCC staff at the national office in Atlanta, where she worked closely with James Forman, Ruby Doris Smith-Robinson, and Julian Bond.

Richardson relocated to Mississippi during 1964 Freedom Summer after the SNCC national office moved there. She worked with SNCC during their effort that summer to register African American voters in Mississippi, joining Amzie Moore, Bob Moses, Curtis Hayes, and Hollis Watkins. Richardson also worked in SNCC's projects in Lowndes County, Alabama (with Stokely Carmichael/Kwame Ture and others) and in Southwest Georgia. Richardson became Julian Bond's office manager in 1965, during his successful first campaign for the Georgia House of Representatives. She also organized a northern Freedom School, bringing together young activists from SNCC's northern and southern projects.

== Drum and Spear Bookstore ==
In 1968, shortly after the assassination of Martin Luther King Jr., Richardson and other former SNCC staffers founded Drum and Spear Bookstore in Washington, D.C. It became the largest Black bookstore in the country, with Richardson as the children's editor of Drum and Spear Press. Richardson said about the bookstore's name that the drum symbolized "communications within the diaspora" while the spear suggested "whatever else might be necessary for the liberation of the people."

In 1970, Howard University's Journal of Negro Education published Richardson's essay on racism in Black children's books.

== Later years ==
Richardson attended Columbia University and received her degree from Antioch College in General Studies. In 2012, Richardson received an honorary degree from Swarthmore and spoke at the 2012 commencement ceremony.

In 2019, Richardson was the keynote speaker for National History Day. In September 2020 she was featured on the USA Today Storytellers Project Live.

Richardson serves on the board of directors of the SNCC Legacy Project, which preserves records of Black activism past and present.

Richardson was recognized as a Local Hero and interviewed by Congressman Jamie Raskin on January 12, 2024. The interview was posted on YouTube, episode 192 of the Local Hero Video Series.

== Films and publications ==
Starting in the late 1970s, Richardson became an early researcher, series associate producer, and content advisor for the series Eyes on the Prize, which Henry Hampton executive produced through his company Blackside. Eyes on the Prize was a 14-hour documentary series on the history of the American civil rights movement, broadcast on PBS in 1987 and 1990. The series was nominated for an Academy Award for Best Documentary Feature in 1988. Richardson later co-produced Blackside's 1994 Emmy and Peabody Award-winning documentary, Malcolm X: Make It Plain (for PBS's The American Experience).

Serving as a senior producer for Northern Light Productions in Boston, Richardson produced historical documentaries for broadcast and museums, with a focus on African American historical events, including: a one-hour documentary called Scarred Justice: Orangeburg Massacre 1968 (South Carolina) for PBS; two History Channel documentaries on slavery and slave resistance; and installations for, among others, the National Park Service's Little Rock Nine Visitor Center, the National Underground Railroad Freedom Center, the New York State Historical Society's "Slavery in New York" exhibit, and the Paul Laurence Dunbar House.

Richardson co-edited Hands on the Freedom Plow: Personal Accounts By Women in SNCC published by University of Illinois Press. The book won the NAACP Image Award for Outstanding Literary Work, Nonfiction in 2011.
