= Ruby Doris Smith-Robinson =

American activist (1942–1967)

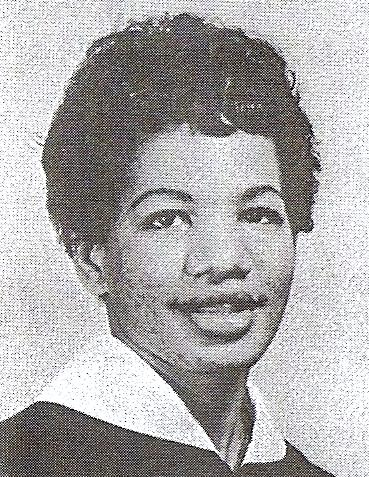
- Born: Ruby Doris Smith; April 25, 1942; Atlanta, Georgia, U.S.
- Died: October 7, 1967 (aged 25); Atlanta, Georgia, U.S.
- Resting place: South-View Cemetery, Atlanta
- Organization: Student Nonviolent Coordinating Committee
- Movement: Civil Rights Movement
- Spouse: Clifford Robinson (m. 1964)
- Children: 1
- Relatives: Keisha Lance Bottoms (niece)

Ruby Doris Smith-Robinson (April 25, 1942 – October 7, 1967) was an American civil rights activist who worked with the Student Nonviolent Coordinating Committee (SNCC) from its earliest days in 1960 until her death in October 1967. She served the organization as an activist in the field and as an administrator in the Atlanta central office. She eventually succeeded James Forman as SNCC's executive secretary and was the only woman ever to serve in this capacity. She was well respected by her SNCC colleagues and others within the movement for her work ethic and dedication to those around her. SNCC Freedom Singer Matthew Jones recalled, "You could feel her power in SNCC on a daily basis". Jack Minnis, director of SNCC's opposition research unit, insisted that people could not fool her. Over the course of her life, she served 100 days in prison for the movement.

== Early life ==
Smith-Robinson was born in Atlanta, Georgia, United States, on April 25, 1942, and spent her childhood in Atlanta's Summerhill neighborhood. She was the second oldest of seven children born to Alice, a beautician, and J. T. Smith, a furniture mover and Baptist minister. The Smith children lived a comfortable existence in their separate Black world. Their parents made their earnings off of Black patronage rather than from the support of whites, which showed Ruby from a young age the power and independence that Black people could have. They had strong adult support, and they had their own churches, schools, and social activities.

No matter how insulated they were, however, the reality of American racism and segregation intruded from time to time. Smith-Robinson recalled her feelings about segregation in those early years saying, "I was conscious of my Blackness. Every young Negro growing up in the South has thoughts about the racial situation." Her sister Catherine remembers that even as an adolescent, Ruby said to her, "I know what my life and mission is…It's to set the Black people free. I will never rest until it happens. I will die for that cause."

Ruby also remembered her reaction to the white people she came in contact with when she was a youngster: "I didn't recognize their existence, and they didn't recognize mine....My only involvement was in throwing rocks at them". A specific encounter she had with segregation as a young girl was on a summer day when she and her sister went to the drugstore for an ice cream cone. The clerk used his hands to grab her cone and handed it to her. She replied saying, "I won't be eating that one" because she knew that they used tissues to grab cones for the white customers.

Ruby's mother encouraged her to study hard and to participate in extracurricular activities rather than help with household work. At the age of 16, Ruby graduated from Price High School and went on to Spelman College, one of the most prestigious Black colleges in the United States.

== Atlanta Student Movement ==
Young Ruby, like many young Black Americans of her generation, became convinced that change was possible. When she entered Spelman College in 1959, she quickly became involved in the Atlanta Student Movement after being inspired by the Greensboro North Carolina lunch counter sit-in, which prevented blacks from eating at the same lunch counter as white people did during her sophomore year. She participated in many sit-ins and was arrested a few times after getting involved in the Atlanta Student Movement. She regularly picketed and protested with her colleagues in a bid to integrate Atlanta.

In the summer of 1960, though many students involved in the Atlanta Student Movement were no longer on campus, Smith-Robinson continued to organize. This included initiating an economic boycott and kneel-ins at whites churches. The slogan she created for the boycott was "have integration will shop, have segregation will not." Even on days when no one else was there to protest, she picketed outside the A&P grocery store alone.

== Involvement in SNCC ==
The first SNCC meeting Ruby attended was in February 1961. She previously had avoided the organization since there seemed to be a stronger focus on strategy and planning rather than participating in actual protests. However, at this meeting they talked about the jail-versus-bail issue, specifically in relation to a group of students in Rock Hill arrested for demonstrating yet refusing to post bail. SNCC decided to send a delegation, and Ruby ended up going. The group was arrested and sentenced to 30 days in prison. This was the first time that she took part in civil rights activities outside her immediate community.

She became involved in the national movement and joined activities sponsored by the fledgling SNCC such as Freedom Rides, community-action organizing, and voter registration drives and was arrested many times for participating in those activities. In the spring of 1961, Smith left her position as executive secretary of the Atlanta Student Movement to become the full-time southern campus coordinator for SNCC. This meant dropping out of college her junior year, although she had intentions of returning. Once she joined the Freedom Riders, she immediately took part of a ride that was going from Nashville, Tennessee, to Montgomery, Alabama, on May 17, 1961. However, she was violently attacked and beaten in Montgomery and was arrested in Jackson, Mississippi, for traveling inflammatory. After the arrest, she used "jail no bail" by accepting 45 days in Parchman State Prison.

After Ruby served time in prison for taking part in the Freedom Rides, she was a student conferee at a student leadership seminar taking part in Nashville, Tennessee. Here she raised the issue of attacks within the black community and the need to deal with problems among fraternities and sororities. She noticed that the majority of graduates from the universities that produced the most doctors and lawyers were light-skinned and connected to fraternities. She discovered that this was due to the fact that fraternity brothers were on the admissions committees. The movement's focus needed to be also within the black community.

In the fall of 1961, she reapplied to Spelman College with a recommendation from Martin Luther King Jr. When she returned, she continued her activity in the Atlanta Student Movement. Since lunch counters had been desegregated, they turned their attention to hospitals. At one demonstration, the protesters walked in through the white entrance. The receptionist told them to leave and added, "Besides you're not sick anyway." Smith-Robinson walked up to the desk, looked her in the eye, and then vomited on the counter. Then she asked, "Is that sick enough for you?"

By 1963, she had become SNCC's administrative secretary and a full-time member of the central office staff working as a day-by-day organizer, financial coordinator, and administrator. She was in charge of the summer voter registration project in Mississippi and was responsible for the Sojourner Truth motor fleet, which provided civil rights workers transportation. The following year, she argued that blacks must maintain the dominance of the SNCC after the organization had become dependent on whites for financial and political help. She suggested that they recruit southerners and set a limit on how many northerners they accepted since they sometimes caused tension within SNCC. One of her coworkers believed she "had been anti-white for years", although others dispute this since later on in her involvement in SNCC, one of her closest friends was white. She maintained much of the black nationalist agenda without being anti-white.

Though there were problems with sexism within SNCC, just as in society, and though men usually had the final say in decisions, Smith-Robinson challenged the typical notions of how women should act by holding a leadership position within SNCC, where she exercised power over men. Commenting on her self-confidence and leadership ability Stokely Carmichael said, "She was convinced that there was nothing that she could not do…she was a tower of strength." In the spring of 1964, she was one of a group of staffers who sat-in at James Forman's office in Atlanta to protest the assumption that as women they would invariably see to the mundane office, and housekeeping, tasks. Her placard read: "No More Minutes Until Freedom Comes to the Atlanta Office". For many years, she was suspected of being the author of the anonymously submitted paper "The Position of Women in SNCC" from the 1964 SNCC staff meeting in Waveland, Mississippi, since credited, principally, to Casey Hayden and Mary King.

Most early SNCC members could recount at least one story about Smith-Robinson. Julian Bond remembered that when a delegation of SNCC staff was preparing to board a plane for Africa in the fall of 1964 to observe the success of the nonviolence technique, an airline representative told them the plane was overbooked and asked if they would wait and take a later flight. This angered Smith-Robinson so much that without consulting the rest of the group she went and sat down in the jetway and refused to move. They were given seats on that flight. This spirit displayed in her activism was also part of her administrative demeanor. SNCC was particularly drawn to Guinea because it was a symbol of freedom and power to African Americans; they were the only country in Africa under French colonial rule that chose immediate independence rather than maintaining a political association and continuing to receive aid. While in Guinea, they met with government officials and the president. After Smith-Robinson came back from Africa, she devoted herself to Black nationalism.

In 1964, while still devoting much of her time to SNCC, she married Clifford Robinson and in 1965 had a son, Kenneth Toure Robinson, named in honor of the president of Guinea. She returned to work just two weeks after giving birth. During the same period, she also graduated from Spelman with a bachelor's degree in physical education. Balancing a marriage, a child, and movement work was a challenge that left little to no time for her to rest. To deal with her frustration and anxiety, she kept empty Coca-Cola bottles in her office, which she would throw against the wall, sweep up their remains, then get back to work.

In May 1966, she replaced James Forman, becoming the first woman elected executive secretary. Smith-Robinson was responsible for providing logistics and support for the many community organizing initiatives SNCC began in the south and north during the group's Black Power campaign. During the same election, Stokely Carmichael was voted in as chairman, which transformed the organization since he was perceived as militant and anti-white.

== Death ==
In January 1967, her health began to decline precipitously around the same time as the splintering of SNCC, and she was admitted to a hospital. She suffered for ten months from a rare blood disease, and in April of that year she was diagnosed with terminal cancer. She died on October 7, 1967, aged 25. One of her co-workers claimed, "She died of exhaustion…she was destroyed by the movement." She was buried in South-View Cemetery in Atlanta.

== Legacy ==
Smith-Robinson is the subject of a biography by Cynthia Fleming, entitled Soon We Will Not Cry (1998).

== Other sources ==
- http://www.stanford.edu/group/King/chronology/details/660616.htm
- Garland, Phyl. "Builders of a New South", Ebony (August 1966)
- Jones, Matthew. Personal interview (April 24, 1989)
- Minnis, Jack. Personal interview (November 4, 1990).
