= Student Nonviolent Coordinating Committee =

Activist organization during the civil rights movement

- Abbreviation: SNCC
- Formation: 1960; 66 years ago
- Founder: Ella Baker
- Dissolved: 1970; 56 years ago
- Purpose: Civil rights movement Participatory democracy Pacifism; Black Power
- Headquarters: Atlanta, Georgia, U.S.
- Region served: Deep South and Mid-Atlantic
- Main organ: The Student Voice (1960–1965); The Movement (1966–1970)
- Subsidiaries: Friends of SNCC; Poor People's Corporation
- Affiliations: Southern Christian Leadership Conference; Council of Federated Organizations; Mississippi Freedom Democratic Party; Lowndes County Freedom Organization; Black Panther Party; Third World Women's Alliance

The Student Nonviolent Coordinating Committee, and later the Student National Coordinating Committee (SNCC, pronounced /snɪk/ SNIK), was the principal channel of student commitment in the United States to the civil rights movement during the 1960s. Emerging in 1960 from the student-led sit-ins at segregated lunch counters in Greensboro, North Carolina, and Nashville, Tennessee, the Committee sought to coordinate and assist direct-action challenges to the civic segregation and political exclusion of African Americans. From 1962, with the support of the Voter Education Project, SNCC committed to the registration and mobilization of black voters in the Deep South. Affiliates such as the Mississippi Freedom Democratic Party and the Lowndes County Freedom Organization in Alabama also worked to increase the pressure on federal and state government to enforce constitutional protections.

By the mid-1960s the measured nature of the gains made, and the violence with which they were resisted, were generating dissent from the group's principles of nonviolence, of white participation in the movement, and of field-driven, as opposed to national-office, leadership and direction. By this time many of SNCC's original organizers were working with the Southern Christian Leadership Conference (SCLC), and others were being lost to a de-segregating Democratic Party and to federally-funded anti-poverty programs. At the same time, the Committee took positions on international affairs that alienated establishment supporters: opposition to the Vietnam War and, in the wake of the Six-Day War, criticism of Israel. Following an aborted merger with the Black Panther Party in 1968, SNCC effectively dissolved.

Because of the successes of its early years, SNCC is credited with breaking down barriers, both institutional and psychological, to the empowerment of African-American communities.

== 1960: Emergence from the sit-in movement ==
The Student Nonviolent Coordinating Committee (SNCC) was formed in April 1960 at a conference at Shaw University in Raleigh, North Carolina, attended by 126 student delegates from 58 sit-in centers in 12 states, from 19 northern colleges, and from the Southern Christian Leadership Conference (SCLC), the Congress of Racial Equality (CORE), the Fellowship of Reconciliation (FOR), the National Student Association (NSA), and Students for a Democratic Society (SDS). Among those attending who were to emerge as strategists for the committee and its field projects were Fisk University student Diane Nash, Tennessee State student Marion Barry, and American Baptist Theological Seminary students James Bevel, John Lewis, and Bernard Lafayette, all involved in the Nashville Student Movement; their mentor at Vanderbilt University, James Lawson; Charles F. McDew, who led student protests at South Carolina State University; J. Charles Jones, Johnson C. Smith University, who organized 200 students to participate in sit-ins at whites-only department stores and service counters throughout Charlotte, North Carolina; Julian Bond from Morehouse College, Atlanta; and Stokely Carmichael from Howard University, Washington, D.C.

The invitation had been issued by Martin Luther King Jr. on behalf of the SCLC, but the conference had been conceived and organized by the then SCLC director Ella Baker. Baker was a critic of what she perceived as King's top-down leadership at the SCLC. "Strong people don't need strong leaders", she told the young activists. Speaking to the students' own experience of protest organization, it was Baker's vision that appeared to prevail.

SNCC did not constitute itself as the youth wing of SCLC. It steered an independent course that sought to channel the students' program through the organizers out in the field rather than through its national office in Atlanta ("small and rather dingy", located above a beauty parlor near the city's five Black colleges). Under the constitution adopted, the SNCC comprised representatives from each of the affiliated "local protest groups", and these groups (and not the committee and its support staff) were to be recognized as "the primary expression of a protest in a given area."

Under the same general principle, that "the people who do the work should make the decisions", the students committed to a "participatory democracy" which, avoiding office hierarchy, sought to reach decisions by consensus. Group meetings were convened in which every participant could speak for as long as they wanted and the meeting would continue until everyone who was left was in agreement with the decision. Given the physical risks involved in many activities in which SNCC was to engage this was thought particularly important: "no one felt comfortable making a decision by majority rule that might cost somebody else's life."

Initially the SNCC continued the focus on sit-ins and boycotts targeting establishments (restaurants, retail stores, theaters) and public amenities maintaining whites-only or segregated facilities. But it was to adopt a new tactic that helped galvanize the movement nationally. In February 1961, Diane Nash, Ruby Doris Smith, Charles Sherrod, and J. Charles Jones joined the Rock Hill, South Carolina sit-in protests and followed the example of the Friendship Nine in enduring an extended jail time rather than post bail. The "Jail-no-Bail" stand was seen as a moral refusal to accept, and to effectively subsidize, a corrupted constitution-defiant police and judicial system—while at the same time saving the movement money it did not have.

As way to "dramatize that the church, the house of all people, fosters segregation more than any other institution", SNCC students also participated in "kneel-ins"—kneeling in prayer outside of Whites-only churches. Presbyterians churches, targeted because their "ministers lacked the protection and support of a church hierarchy", were not long indifferent. In August 1960, the 172nd General Assembly of the United Presbyterian Church wrote to SNCC: "Laws and customs requiring racial discrimination are, in our judgement, such serious violations of the law of God as to justify peaceful and orderly disobedience or disregard of these laws."

== 1961 Freedom Rides ==
Organized by the Congress of Racial Equality (CORE) to dramatize the southern states' disregard of the Supreme Court rulings (Morgan v. Virginia, 1946 and Boynton v. Virginia, 1960) outlawing segregation in interstate transportation, in May 1961, the first Freedom Riders (seven black, six white, led by CORE director James Farmer) travelled together on interstate buses. In Anniston, Alabama, they were brutally attacked by mobs of Ku Klux Klansmen. Local police stood by. After they were assaulted again in Birmingham, Alabama, and under pressure from the Kennedy Administration, CORE announced it was discontinuing the action. Undeterred, Diane Nash called for new riders. Oretha Castle Haley, Jean C. Thompson, Rudy Lombard, James Bevel, Marion Barry, Angeline Butler, Stokely Carmichael, and Joan Trumpauer Mulholland joined John Lewis and Hank Thomas, the two young SNCC members of the original Ride. They traveled on to a savage beating in Montgomery, Alabama, to arrest in Jackson, Mississippi, and to confinement in the Maximum Security (Death Row) Unit of the infamous Mississippi State Penitentiary--"Parchman Farm".

Recognizing SNCC's determination, CORE and the SCLC rejected the Administration's call for a "cooling off" period and joined with the students in a Freedom Riders Coordinating Committee to keep the Rides rolling through June and into September. During those months, more than 60 different Freedom Rides criss-crossed the South, most of them converging on Jackson, where every Rider was arrested, more than 300 in total. An unknown number were arrested in other Southern towns, and many were beaten including, in Monroe, North Carolina, SNCC's Executive Secretary James Forman. It is estimated that almost 450 people, black and white in equal number, participated.

With CORE, SNCC had been making plans for a mass demonstration in Washington when Attorney General Robert F. Kennedy finally prevailed on the Interstate Commerce Commission (ICC) to issue rules giving force to the repudiation of the "separate but equal" doctrine. After the new ICC rules took effect on November 1, 1961, passengers were permitted to sit wherever they pleased on interstate buses and trains; "white" and "colored" signs were to be removed from the terminals (lunch counters, drinking fountains, toilets, and waiting rooms) serving interstate customers.

To test the ICC ruling and in the hope of mobilizing the local black community in a broader campaign, in October 1961 SNCC members Charles Sherrod and Cordell Reagon led a sit-in at the bus terminal in Albany, Georgia. By mid-December, having drawn in the NAACP and a number of other organizations, the Albany Movement had more than 500 protesters in jail. There they were joined briefly by Martin Luther King Jr. and by Ralph Abernathy. King sought advantage in the national media attention his arrest had drawn. In return for the city's commitment to comply with the ICC ruling and to release those protesters willing to post bail, he agreed to leave town. The city reneged, however, so protests and subsequent arrests continued into 1962.

News reports across the country portrayed the Albany debacle as "one of the most stunning defeats" in King's career. What they also reported was conflict with SNCC. The New York Times noted that King's SCLC had taken steps "that seemed to indicate they were assuming control" of the movement in Albany, and that the student group had "moved immediately to recapture its dominant position on the scene". If the differences between the organizations were not resolved, the paper predicted "tragic consequences".

== 1962 voter registration campaigns ==
As a result of meetings brokered by the Kennedy Administration with large liberal foundations, the Voter Education Project (VEP) was formed in early 1962 to channel funds into voter drives in the eleven Southern states. Inducted by sit-in campaigns and hardened in the Freedom Rides, many student activists saw VEP as a government attempt to co-opt their movement. Lonnie C. King Jr., a student from Morehouse College in Atlanta, felt that "by rechanneling its energies" what the Kennedys were "trying to do was kill the Movement." But others were already convinced that obtaining the right to vote was the key to unlocking political power for Black Americans. Older Black southerners had been pressing SNCC to move in this direction for some time. Mississippi NAACP leader Amzie Moore had tabled a voter registration drive at the SNCC's second conference in October 1960.

A split over the priority to be accorded voter registration was avoided by Ella Baker's intervention. She suggested that the organization create two distinct wings: one for direct action (which Diane Nash was to lead) and the other for voter registration. But the white violence visited in the summer of 1961 on the first registration efforts (under the direction of Bob Moses) in McComb, Mississippi, including the murder of activist Herbert Lee, persuaded many that in the Deep South voter registration was as direct a challenge to white supremacy as anything they had been doing before. "If you went into Mississippi and talked about voter registration they're going to hit you on the side of the head and that," Reggie Robinson, one of the SNCC's first field secretaries, quipped, is "as direct as you can get."

In 1962, Bob Moses garnered further support for SNCC's efforts by forging a coalition, the Council of Federated Organizations (COFO), with, among other groups, the NAACP and the National Council of Churches. With VEP and COFO funding SNCC was able to expand its voter registration efforts into the Mississippi Delta around Greenwood, Southwest Georgia around Albany, and the Alabama Black Belt around Selma. All of these projects endured police harassment and arrests; KKK violence including shootings, bombings, and assassinations; and economic sanctions against those blacks who dared to try to register.

== 1963 Washington and the Leesburg Stockade ==
=== March on Washington ===
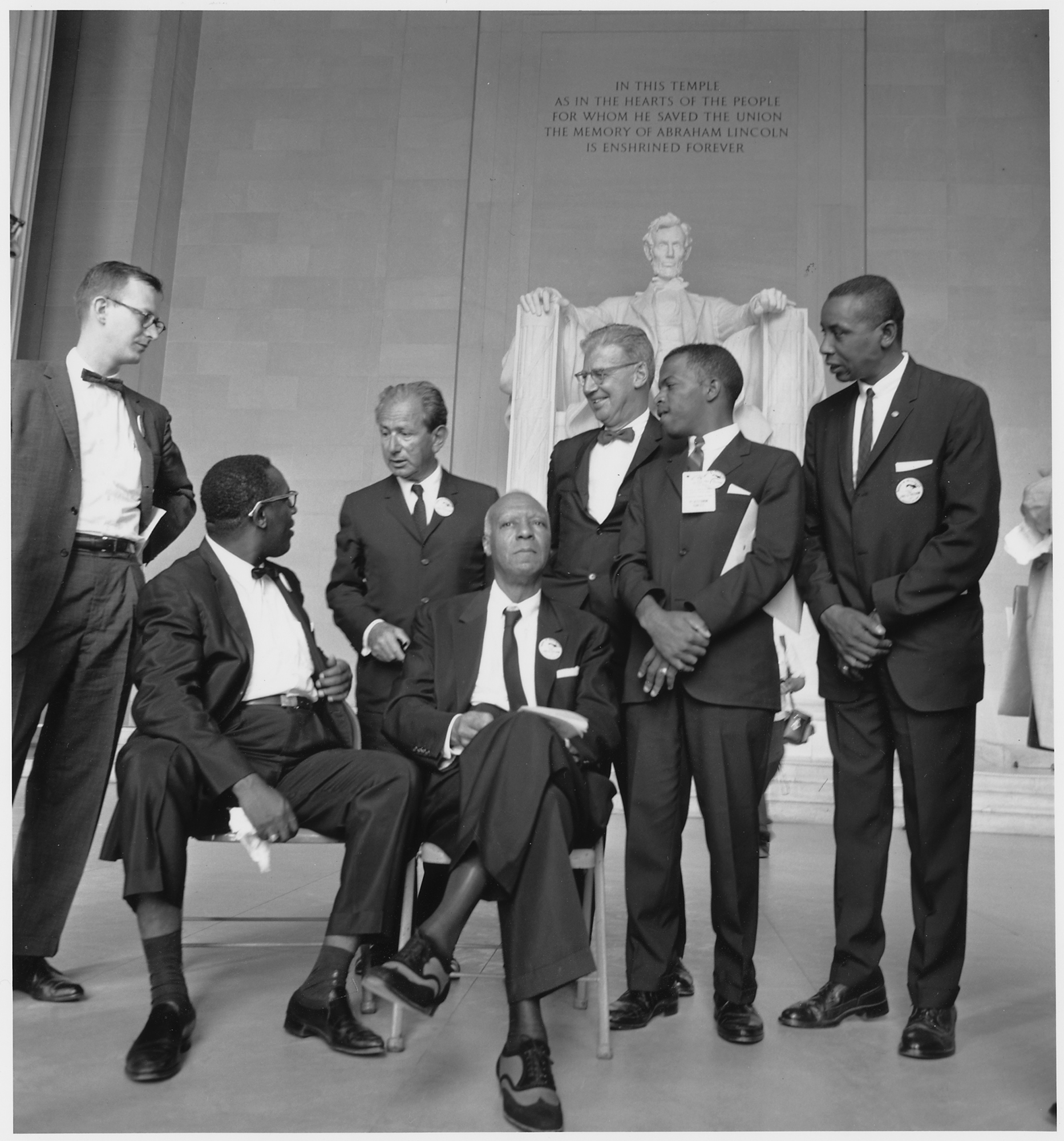
John Lewis representing SNCC at the Civil Rights March on Washington in 1963

Although it is an event largely remembered for King's delivery of his "I Have a Dream" speech, SNCC had a significant role in the 1963 March on Washington for Jobs and Freedom. But it was at odds with the other sponsoring civil rights, labor, and religious organizations, all of whom were prepared to applaud the Kennedy Administration for its Civil Rights Bill (the Civil Rights Act of 1964).

In the version of his speech leaked to the press John Lewis remarked that those marching for jobs and freedom "have nothing to be proud of, for hundreds and thousands of our brothers are not here—for they have no money for their transportation, for they are receiving starvation wages...or no wages at all." He went on to announce:

In good conscience, we cannot support the administration's civil rights bill. This bill will not protect young children and old women from police dogs and fire hoses when engaging in peaceful demonstrations. This bill will not protect the citizens of Danville, Virginia who must live in constant fear in a police state. This bill will not protect the hundreds of people who have been arrested on trumped-up charges like those in Americus, Georgia, where four young men are in jail, facing a death penalty, for engaging in peaceful protest. I want to know, which side is the federal government on? The revolution is a serious one. Mr. Kennedy is trying to take the revolution out of the streets and put it in the courts. Listen Mr. Kennedy, the black masses are on the march for jobs and for freedom, and we must say to the politicians that there won't be a "cooling-off period".

Under pressure from the other groups, changes were made. "We cannot support" the 1963 Kennedy Civil Rights Bill was re-scripted as "we support with reservations". In the view of the then SNCC executive secretary, James Forman, those who had pushed the change were selling out to the cautious liberal politics of labor-movement leadership and the Catholic and Protestant church hierarchy. "If people had known they had come to Washington to aid the Kennedy administration, they would not have come in the numbers they did."

=== Sidelining of women ===
A feature of the march itself, was that men and women were directed to proceed separately and that only male speakers were scheduled to address the Lincoln Memorial rally. Together with Coretta Scott King and other wives of civil leaders, SNCC staffer and Ella Baker protégé Casey Hayden found herself walking up Independence Avenue while the media recorded the men marching down Constitution Avenue.

Despite protesting behind the scenes with Anna Hedgeman (who was to go on to co-found the National Organization for Women), women were to be featured as singers, but not as speakers. In the event, a few women were allowed to sit on the Lincoln Memorial platform and the NAACP's Daisy Bates, who had been instrumental in the integration of Little Rock Central High School, was permitted a brief tribute to "Negro Women Fighters for Freedom". From their "bitterly humiliating" experience in Washington, Pauli Murray, who later coined the term "Jane Crow" to describe the double handicap of race and sex, concluded that black women "can no longer postpone or subordinate the fight against discrimination because of sex to the civil rights struggle but must carry on both fights simultaneously."

=== Leesburg Stockade ===
In the previous month, July 1963, SNCC was involved in another march that eventually made headlines. With the NAACP in Americus, Georgia, SNCC organized a protest march on a segregated movie theater that concluded with the arrest of upwards of 33 high-school girls. The "Stolen Girls" were imprisoned 45 days without charge in brutal conditions in the Lee County Public Works building, the Leesburg Stockade. It took SNCC photographer Danny Lyon smuggling himself into the Stockade to publicize the case nationally

== 1964 Freedom Summer ==
In the fall of 1963, with the assistance of 100 northern volunteers SNCC conducted the Freedom Ballot, a mock gubernatorial election in which over 80,000 black Mississippians demonstrated their willingness to exercise the constitutional right to vote that state law and violent intimidation had denied them since Reconstruction. (Only 6.7 per cent of the black voting age population of Mississippi was registered, compared to 70.2 per cent of the white voting age population). In coordination with CORE, the SNCC followed up on the ballot with the 1964 Mississippi Summer Project, also known as Freedom Summer. This brought over 700 white Northern students to the South, where they volunteered as teachers and organizers.

The volunteers were trained at Miami University in Ohio by among others, Hollis Watkins. Watkins, a graduate of the social-justice leadership Highlander Folk School in Tennessee, had feared that bringing in outsiders would disrupt the growth of the grassroots programs that were already in place and that after the volunteers left, it would be harder to get the local movements moving again. His reservations were overridden by the argument of the freelance social activist Allard Lowenstein: white students would not only "provide needed manpower", but "their white skins" would also "provoke interest from the news media that black skins could not produce." With the murder of two of their number, Andrew Goodman and Michael Schwerner, alongside local activist (Freedom Rider and voter educator) James Chaney, this indeed was to be the effect. Freedom Summer attracted international attention.

For SNCC the focus of summer project became the organization, through the Mississippi Freedom Democratic Party (MFDP), of a parallel state Democratic Party primary. The MFDP would send an integrated slate of delegates to the 1964 Democratic National Convention in Atlantic City and there contest the credentials of the all-white Mississippi regulars.

As part of this project SNCC's Charlie Cobb proposed summer field schools. Encouraging youth "to articulate their own desires, demands, and questions", the schools would help ensure a movement for social change in the state that would continue to be led by Mississippians. This was, he suggested, what organizing for voter registration was all about – "challenging people in various ways to take control of their own lives." Over the course of Freedom Summer (and with assistance in developing the curriculum from, among others, Howard Zinn), COFO set up more than 40 Freedom Schools in African-American communities across Mississippi. More than 3,000 students attended, many of whom participated in registration efforts.

With the encouragement of SNCC field secretary Frank Smith, a meeting of cotton pickers at a Freedom School in Shaw, Mississippi, gave birth to the Mississippi Freedom Labor Union. At its peak, in the summer of 1965 the MFLU had 1,350 members and about 350 on strike.

On August 4, 1964, before the state MFDP convention, the bodies of Chaney, Goodman, and Schwerner were discovered buried in an earthen dam. Missing for weeks since disappearing after investigating a church burning in June 1964, they were subjects of a massive manhunt that involved the FBI and United States sailors from a nearby base. In the course of the search the corpses of several black Mississippians were uncovered whose disappearances had not previously attracted attention outside the Delta.

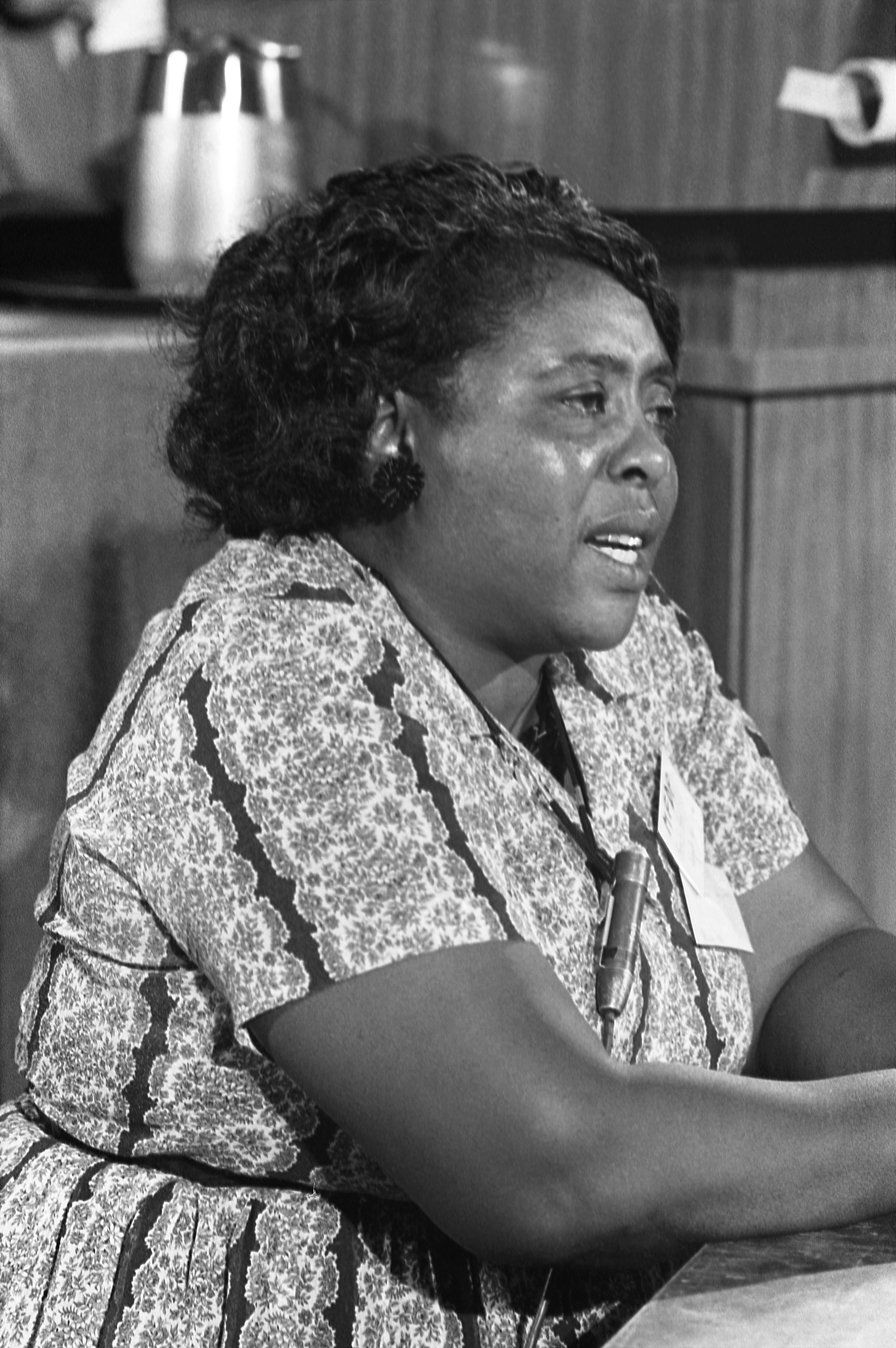
Fannie Lou Hamer (1964) speaks at a Democratic Convention regarding the plight of sharecroppers.

Notwithstanding the national outrage generated by the murders, the Johnson Administration was determined to deflect the MDFP effort. With the presidential election approaching, the priority was to protect the Democrats' "Solid South" against inroads being made by Republican Barry Goldwater's campaign and to minimise support for George Wallace's third-party challenge. The MFDP nonetheless got to the National Democratic Convention in Atlantic City at the end of August.

The proceedings of the convention's credentials committee were televised, giving a national and international audience to the testimony of SNCC field secretary Fannie Lou Hamer: to her portrayal of the brutalities of a sharecropper's life, and of the obstruction and violence encountered by an African American in the exercise her constitutional rights. (Hamer still bore the marks of beatings meted to her, her father and other SNCC workers by police in Winona, Mississippi, just a year before). But with the all-white delegations of other southern states threatening to walk out, Johnson engineered a "compromise" in which the national Democratic Party offered the 68 MFDP delegates two at-large seats from where they could watch the floor proceedings but not take part. Fannie Lou Hamer led her delegates out of the convention: "We didn't come all this way for no two seats when all of us is tired."

Activists, Hayden suggests, were staggered to find the Democratic Party "in the role of racist lunch counter owner": "the core of SNCC's work, voter registration, was [now] open to question." In the wake of Atlantic City, Elaine DeLott Baker recalls the desolation of project offices "that had only recently been hives of activity and energy" and the shutting down of Freedom Schools and community centers.

In September 1964, at a COFO conference in New York, Bob Moses had to see off two challenges to SNCC's future role in Mississippi. First, he had to defend the SNCC's anti-"Red-baiting" insistence on "free association": the NAACP had threatened to pull out of COFO if SNCC continued to engage the services of the Communist Party associated National Lawyers Guild. Second, he had to deflect a proposal from Lowenstein and Democratic Party operative Barney Frank that in a future summer program decision-making be removed from organizers in the field to a new office in New York City responsible directly to liberal-foundation and church funders. Dorothy Zellner (a white radical SNCC staffer) remarked that, "What they [Lowenstein and Frank] want is to let the Negro into the existing society, not to change it."

== 1965: Differences over "structure" and direction ==
At the end of 1964, SNCC fielded the largest staff of any civil rights organization in the South. Yet to many the movement seemed to be at a loss.

In Mississippi, Casey Hayden recalls, everyone "reeling from the violence" (3 project workers killed; 4 people critically wounded; 80 beaten, 1,000 arrests; 35 shooting incidents, 37 churches bombed or burned; and 30 black businesses or homes burned), and also from "the new racial imbalance" following the summer influx of white student volunteers. The local black staff, "the backbone" of the projects were frustrated, even resentful, at having to deal "with a lot of young white people who were intellectual and moneyed", "ignorant" of realities on the ground, and who, with their greater visibility, brought additional risks. But most of all SNCC activists were "staggered" by the debacle in Atlantic City. Being confronted by the Democratic Party "in the role of racist lunch counter owner" had thrown "the core of SNCC's work", voter registration, into question.

Notwithstanding passage of the Civil Rights Act of 1964 barring discrimination in public accommodations, employment and private education, and the equally broad Voting Rights Act of 1965, faith in the Johnson Administration and its liberal allies was ebbing, and a gulf had opened between SNCC and other civil rights organizations. In Atlantic City Fannie Lou Hamer confessed she "lost hope in American society."

Questions of strategic direction were also questions of "structure". What Stokely Carmichael described as "not an organization but a lot of people all doing what they think needs to be done", was for Hayden the very realization of her mentor's vision. Such was "the participatory, town-hall, consensus-forming nature" of the operation Ella Baker had helped set in motion that Hayden could feel herself to be "at the center of the organization" without having, "in any public way", to be "a leader".

Yet when Elaine DeLott Baker joined Hayden in Mississippi in May 1964 she found "a hierarchy in place". Based "on considerations of race, the amount of time spent in the struggle, dangers suffered, and finally, of gender," this was not a hierarchy office, but "an unspoken understanding of who should speak up at meetings, who should propose ideas in public places, and who should remain silent." Black men were at the top, "then black women, followed by white men, and at the bottom, white women." Field staff, among them "women, black and white," still retained "an enormous amount of operational freedom, they were indeed the ones that were keeping things moving." But from those leading the debate on new directions for the movement DeLott Baker saw "little recognition of that reality," and the ground was shifting.

The violence and emotional stresses of four years had eroded the focus and spirits of many veteran field staffers who appeared to central office staff as increasingly unpredictable and unreliable. Communication between core staff and field staff was poor and getting worse. To field staff, the Atlanta office was out of touch and becoming more and more irrelevant. Meanwhile, there were no central strategies. Resources were dwindling and tensions over the allocation of resources were mounting

As an opportunity to take stock, to critique and reevaluate the movement, a retreat in Waveland, Mississippi, was organized for November 1964. Like Ella Baker, in criticizing King's "messianic" leadership of the SCLC, Executive Secretary James Forman saw himself as championing popularly accountable, grassroots organization. Believing it "would detract from, rather than intensify" the focus on ordinary people's involvement in the movement, he had not appreciated King's appearance in Albany in December 1961. When on March 9, 1965, King, seemingly on his own authority, was able to turn the second Selma to Montgomery march back at the Edmund Pettus Bridge where two days before ("Bloody Sunday") the first had been brutally charged and batoned, Forman was appalled. Yet within SNCC itself Forman increasingly was concerned by the lack of "internal cohesion".

At Waveland Forman proposed that the staff (some twenty), who under the original constitution had had "a voice but no vote," constitute "themselves as the Coordinating Committee" and elect a new Executive. It was time to recognize that SNCC no longer had a "student base" (with the move to voter registration, the original campus protest groups had largely evaporated) and that the staff, "the people who do the most work", were the organization's real "nucleus". But the "many problems and many strains within the organization" caused by the "freedom" allowed to organizers in the field were also reason, he argued, to "change and alter" the structure of decision making. Given the "external pressures" the requirement now was for "unity".

Bob Moses opposed. The role of SNCC was to stimulate social struggles, not to provide an institutionalized leadership. "Leadership," Moses believed, "will emerge from the movement that emerges."

Leadership is there in the people. You don't have to worry about where your leaders are, how are you going to get some leaders. ... If you go out and work with your people leadership will emerge. ... We don't know who they are now: and we don't need to know.

"To get us through the impasse", Casey Hayden tried to attach to Forman's proposal various sub-committees and provisos to ensure that "leadership for all our programs" would continue to be driven from the field, and not from central office "which makes many program areas responsible to one person rather than to all of us." For Forman this still suggested too loose, too confederal a structure for an organization whose challenge, without the manpower and publicity of white volunteers, was to mount and coordinate a Southwide Freedom Summer and "build a Black Belt political party."

At her last Committee meeting in the fall of 1965, Hayden told both Forman and Chairman John Lewis that the "imbalance of power within SNCC" was such that, if the movement was to remain "radically democratic", they would need to step down. Forman and Lewis did step down in their own time, in the spring, but with questions of structure and direction for the organization unresolved.

== 1966: Black Power ==
=== Carmichael and the Vine Street Project Statement ===
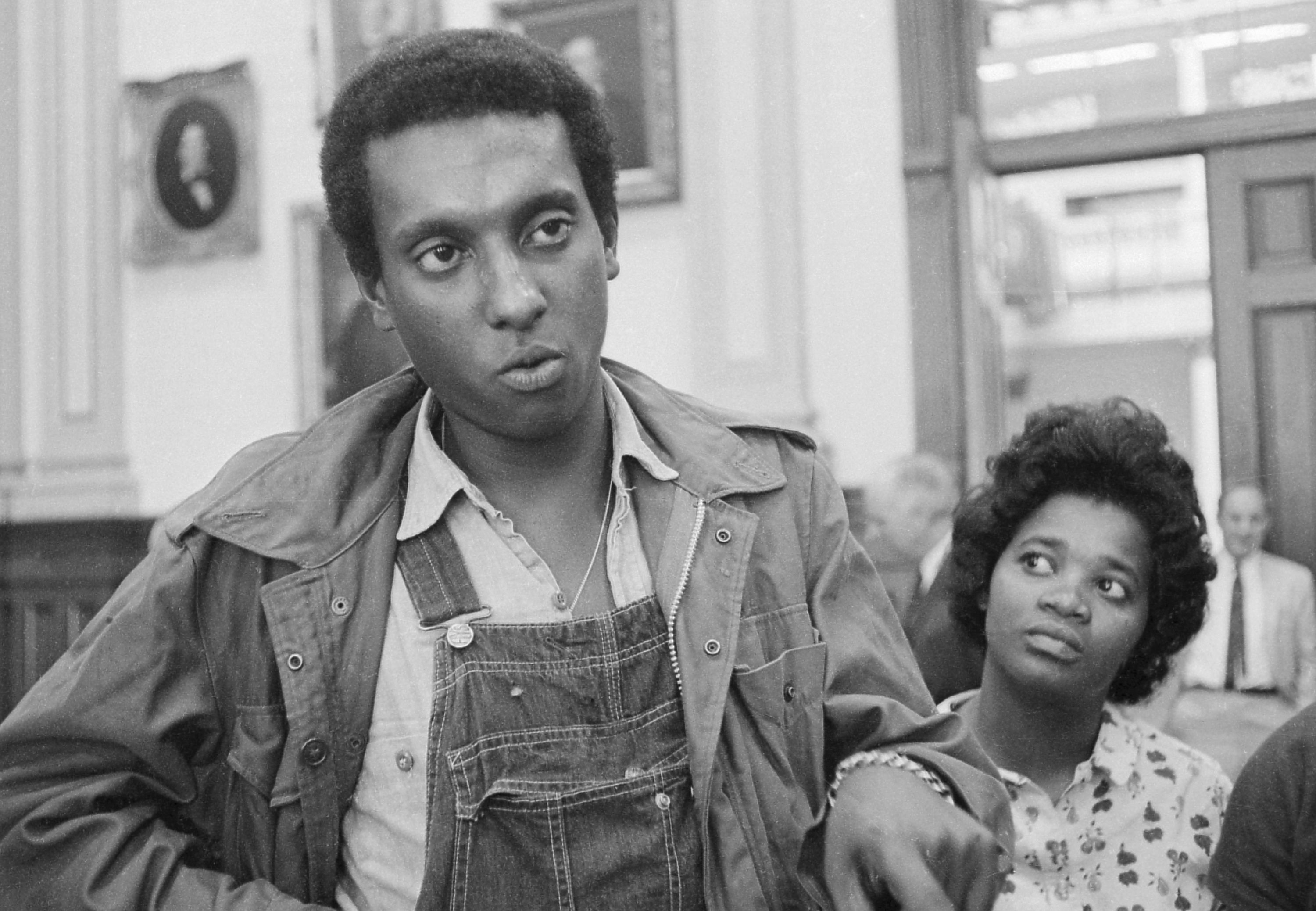
Stokely Carmichael 1966 Mississippi press conference

In May 1966 Forman was replaced by Ruby Doris Smith-Robinson, who was determined "to keep the SNCC together." But Forman recalls male leaders fighting "her attempts as executive secretary to impose a sense of organizational responsibility and self-discipline," and "trying to justify themselves by the fact that their critic was a woman" In October 1967 Smith-Robinson died, aged just 25, "of exhaustion" according to one of her co-workers, "destroyed by the movement."

Replacing John Lewis as chairman in May 1966 was the 24-year old Stokely Carmichael (the future Kwame Ture). When on the night of June 16, 1966, following protests at the shooting and wounding of solo freedom marcher James Meredith, Carmichael walked out of jail (his 27th arrest) and into Broad Street Park in Greenwood, Mississippi, he asked the waiting crowd "What do you want?." They roared back "Black Power! Black Power!"

For Carmichael, Black Power was a "call for black people to define their own goals, to lead their own organizations."

We have to organize ourselves to speak from a position of strength and stop begging people to look kindly upon us. We are going to build a movement in this country based on the color of our skins that is going to free us from our oppressors and we have to do that ourselves.

A new direction SNCC was evident in the Atlanta, Georgia, "Vine City" Project, SNCC's first effort at urban organizing. Co-directed by William "Bill" Ware and Gwendolyn Zoharah Simmons (Robinson), it took up the challenge of the Georgia State Legislature's refusal to seat Julian Bond because of SNCC opposition to the Vietnam War.

Ware, who had been greatly affected by his experience of newly independent Ghana, emphasized racial solidarity. Black people, he argued, needed to work "without the guidance and/or direction and control of non-Blacks". Without control over their affairs, he warned, "Black people will know no freedom, but only more subtle forms of slavery." A Vine Street Project position paper on Black Power, which Simmons helped write, suggested that:

Negroes in this country have never been allowed to organize themselves because of white interference. As a result of this, the stereotype has been reinforced that Blacks cannot organize themselves. The white psychology that Blacks have to be watched, also reinforces this stereotype. Blacks, in fact, feel intimidated by the presence of whites, because of their knowledge of the power that whites have over their lives. One white person can come into a meeting of Black people and change the complexion of that meeting ... People would immediately start talking about "brotherhood", "love", etc.; race would not be discussed.

This was "not to say that whites have not had an important role in the Movement." If people now had "the right to picket, the right to give out leaflets, the right to vote, the right to demonstrate, the right to print," the Vine City paper allowed that it was "mainly because of the entrance of white people into Mississippi, in the summer of '64." But their "role is now over and it should be," for what would it mean "if Black people, once having the right to organize, are not allowed to organize themselves? It means that Blacks' ideas about inferiority are being reinforced."

What was needed now for "people to free themselves" was an "all-Black project" and this had to "exist from the beginning." Future cooperation with whites had to be a matter of "coalition". But there could be "no talk of 'hooking up' unless Black people organize Blacks and white people organize whites." Those "white people who desire change" should go "where the problem (of racism) is most manifest," in their own communities where power has been created "for the express purpose of denying Blacks human dignity and self-determination."

Even without embracing an explicitly separatist agenda, many veteran project directors accepted the case that the presence of white organizers undermined black self-confidence. (Although overridden, on that basis Oretha Castle Haley already in 1962 had suspended whites from the CORE chapter in New Orleans). Julian Bond later reflected:

...the successes Freedom Summer achieved resulted from its embrace of a paradox — it tried to fight bigotry by appealing to people more concerned about whites, not blacks. Appealing to the nation's racism accepted white supremacy. By acknowledging its dependence on whites to popularize the civil rights struggle in the South, SNCC contradicted its rhetorical belief in the equal worth of all races, and undermined its insistence that indigenous blacks were best prepared to lead the struggle for their deliverance from white dominance.

Yet like Forman (now urging the study of Marxism), Carmichael hesitated to accept the implication that whites should be excluded from the movement. It was in December that he led the SNCC national executive in a narrow decision (19 in favor, 18 against and 24 abstentions) to ask white co-workers and volunteers to leave. In May 1967 the Coordinating Committee formally asked its non-black staff to resign. Whites were told they should concentrate on organizing poor white communities and leave SNCC to promote African-American self-reliance.

=== LCFO, the Deacons and armed self-defense ===
Carmichael had been working with a voter registration project in Alabama that had taken what, at the time, may have seemed an equally momentous step. In the face of murderous Klan violence, organizers for the Lowndes County Freedom Organization openly carried arms. Participating in the Selma to Montgomery march, Carmichael had stopped off in the county in March 1965. Local registration efforts were being led by John Hulett who that month, with John C. Lawson, a preacher, became the first two black voters in Lowndes County in more than six decades.

Carmichael gained the confidence of local residents when, handing out voter registration material at a local school, he refused to be intimidated by local police: they were either to arrest him or leave. With SNCC workers then "swarmed" by young people, Carmichael took the initiative to help form the LCFO with Hulett, its first chair. The organization would not only register voters but, as a party, run candidates for office—its symbol, a rampant black panther, representing black "strength and dignity".

Hulett warned the state of Alabama that it had a last chance to peacefully grant African Americans their rights: "We're out to take power legally, but if we're stopped by the government from doing it legally, we're going to take it the way everyone else took it, including the way the Americans took it in the American Revolution." Certain the federal government was not going to protect him and his fellow LCFO members, Hulett told a federal registrar, "if one of our candidates gets touched, we're going to take care of the murderer ourselves."

Together with CORE, SNCC was embracing the principle of armed self-defense. After they, and other civil-rights, organizations had recruited hundreds and then thousands of marchers in June 1966 to continue, in a March Against Fear, what was to have been Meredith's solitary walk from Memphis, Tennessee, to Jackson, Mississippi, Carmichael called for the armed Deacons for Defense and Justice to provide security. The Deacons, formed in November 1964 in response to KKK violence in Jonesboro, Louisiana, had recruited veterans with Korean War and World War II combat experience. After some debate, other leaders, including King, agreed. Akinyele O. Umoja writes: "Finally, though expressing reservations, King conceded to Carmichael's proposals to maintain unity in the march and the movement. The involvement and association of the Deacons with the march signified a shift in the civil rights movement, which had been popularly projected as a 'nonviolent movement."'

=== Interracial coalition ===
While other white SNCC activists in the Broad Street Park, Greenwood, crowd that affirmed Carmichael's call for Black Power were bewildered, Peggy Terry recalls "there was never any rift in my mind or my heart. I just felt Black people were doing what they should be doing. We reached a period in the civil rights movement when Black people felt they weren't being given the respect they should have, and I agreed. White liberals ran everything." The message to white activists, "organize your own", was one that Terry took home with her to Uptown, "Hillbilly Harlem", Chicago. This was the neighborhood in which, having taken the prompt the year before, Casey Hayden had already been working, organizing welfare mothers into a union. She was "on loan" from SNCC to Students for a Democratic Society (SDS). Like other new left groups, SDS did not view a self-consciously black SNCC as separatist. Rather it was seen as the vanguard of a prospective "interracial movement of the poor". Accepting the Vine Street challenge, the goal was no longer integration but what Chicago Black Panther leader Fred Hampton was to project as the "rainbow coalition".

In the South, as SNCC began turning them away white volunteers moved over to the New Orleans–based Southern Conference Education Fund with which Ella Baker had been working since the 1950s. There, in effort to advance a coalition agenda, they joined Bob Zellner, the SNCC's first white field organizer and son of a former Klansman, in working with Carl and Anne Braden to organize white students and poor whites.

== 1966-1967: International solidarity ==
=== Opposition to the Vietnam War ===
The Meredith shooting in June 1966 had been preceded in January by the killing of Sammy Younge Jr., the first black college student to be killed as a result of his involvement in the civil rights movement, and by the acquittal of his killer. SNCC took the occasion to denounce the Vietnam War, the first statement of its kind by a major civil rights organization.

"The murder of Samuel Young in Tuskegee, Alabama," SNCC proposed, "is no different than the murder of peasants in Vietnam, for both Young and the Vietnamese sought, and are seeking, to secure the rights guaranteed them by law. In each case, the United States government bears a great part of the responsibility for these deaths." In the face of a government that "has never guaranteed the freedom of oppressed citizens, and is not yet truly determined to end the rule of terror and oppression within its own borders," where," it asked, "is the draft for the freedom fight in the United States." It could longer countenance the "hypocrisy" of a call upon "negroes ... to stifle the liberation of Vietnam, to preserve a 'democracy' which does not exist for them at home."

At an SDS-organized conference at UC Berkeley in October 1966, Carmichael challenged the white left to escalate their resistance to the military draft in a manner similar to the black movement. Some participants in the August 1965 Watts Uprising and in the ghetto rebellions that followed had already associated their actions with opposition to the Vietnam War, and SNCC had first disrupted an Atlanta draft board in August 1966. According to historians Joshua Bloom and Waldo Martin, SDS's first Stop the Draft Week of October 1967 was "inspired by Black Power [and] emboldened by the ghetto rebellions." SNCC appear to have originated the popular anti-draft slogan: "Hell no! We won't go!"

=== Criticism of Israel ===
In what Ralph Featherstone, program head at the Atlanta office, presented as a contribution to a third-world alliance of the "oppressed", the June–July 1967 SNCC Newsletter published an article by the Committee's communications director, Ethel Minor, embracing the Palestinian cause in the Six-Day War. Drawing heavily on a pamphlet published by the Palestine Research Center, it stated that Zionists had conquered Arab land through "terror, force, and massacres" (a photograph of executions in 1956 carried the caption: "this is the Gaza Strip, Palestine, not Dachau, Germany"); that "Israel segregates those few Arabs who remained in their homeland . . . under martial law"; that "dark-skinned Jews from North Africa and the Middle East are also second class citizens"; and that the resulting state is "tool and foothold for American and British exploitation" in the region.

Anticipating swift condemnation from white liberals, the office head, Johnny Wilson, called a press conference to announce that the article did not represent SNCC's official position. But a subsequent statement from the office in August, “The Middle-East Crisis”, broadly endorsed Minor's analysis while conceding the horrors of the Holocaust, and noting that were also Jewish voices critical of Zionism and Israeli policy.

Seymour Martin Lipset was among the prominent Jewish friends of the movement outraged. Having heard King rebuke a student who echoed the SNCC line on “Zionists”, he suggested that, in contrast to SNCC, the SCLC leader “grasped the identity between anti-Israel politics and antisemitic ranting”. For the historian, Clayborne Carson, the controversy was further evidence that Carmichael and staff members in Atlanta were moving toward "racial separatist positions that discounted the possibility of future black-white coalitions".

== 1967–1968: Northern strategy and the split with Carmichael and the Panthers ==
By early 1967, SNCC was approaching bankruptcy. The call for Black Power and the departure of white activists did not go down well with the liberal foundations and churches in the North. This was at a time when SNCC organizers were themselves heading North to the "ghettoes" where, as the urban riots of the mid-1960s had demonstrated, victories at lunch counters and ballot boxes in the South counted for little. Julian Bond recounts projects being:

...established in Washington, D.C., to fight for home rule; in Columbus, Ohio, where a community foundation was organized; in New York City's Harlem, where SNCC workers organized early efforts at community control of public schools; in Los Angeles, where SNCC helped monitor local police and joined an effort at creating a 'Freedom City' in black neighborhoods; and in Chicago, where SNCC workers began to build an independent political party and demonstrated against segregated schools.

As part of this northern community-organizing strategy, SNCC seriously considered an alliance with Saul Alinsky's mainstream-church supported Industrial Areas Foundation. But Alinsky had little patience or understanding for SNCC's new rhetoric. On stage with Carmichael in Detroit, Alinsky was scathing when, pressed for an example of "Black Power", the SNCC leader cited the IAF's-mentored FIGHT community organization in Rochester, New York. The example was proof that Carmichael and his friends needed to stop "going round yelling 'Black Power!'" and "really go down and organize." It is simple, according to Alinsky: it's "called...community power, and if the community is black, it's black power."

In May 1967, Carmichael relinquished the SNCC chairmanship and speaking out against U.S. policy traveled to Cuba, China, North Vietnam, and finally to Ahmed Sékou Touré's Guinea. Returning to the United States in January 1968 he accepted an invitation to become honorary Prime Minister of the Black Panther Party for Self Defense. Inspired by John Hulet's stand and borrowing the LCFO's black panther moniker, the party had been formed by Bobby Seale and Huey Newton in Oakland, California, in October 1966. For Carmichael the goal was a nation-wide Black United Front.

Carmichael's replacement, H. Rap Brown (later known as Jamil Abdullah Al-Amin), tried to hold what he now called the Student National Coordinating Committee to an alliance with the Panthers. Like Carmichael, Rap Brown had come to view nonviolence as a tactic rather than as a foundational principle. Violence, he famously quipped, was "as American as cherry pie".

In June 1968, the SNCC national executive emphatically rejected the association with the Black Panthers. This was followed in July by a "violent confrontation" in New York City with James Forman, who had resigned as the Panthers' Minister of Foreign Affairs and was then heading up the city's SNCC operation. In the course of a "heated discussion" Panthers accompanying Carmichael and Eldridge Cleaver, the Panthers' Minister of Information, reportedly thrust a pistol into Forman's mouth. For Forman and SNCC this was "the last straw". Carmichael was expelled ("engaging in a power struggle" that "threatened the existence of the organization")—and "Forman wound up first in hospital, and later in Puerto Rico, suffering from a nervous breakdown".

The New York Times reported that it was the "opinion of most people in the movement" that the SNCC Carmichael had left was "pre-Watts", while the Panthers were "post-Watts". The 1965 Watts riots in Los Angeles, they believed, had marked "the end of the middle-class-oriented civil right movement".

Rap Brown himself resigned as SNCC chairman after being indicted for inciting to riot in Cambridge, Maryland, in 1967. On March 9, 1970, two SNCC workers, Ralph Featherstone and William ("Che") Payne, died on a road approaching Bel Air, Maryland, when a bomb on the front floorboard of their car exploded. The bomb's origin is disputed: some say the bomb was planted in an assassination attempt, and others say Payne was intentionally carrying it to the courthouse where Brown was to be tried.

== 1969–1970: Dissolution ==
Chairmen of the Student Nonviolent Coordinating Committee
Marion Barry	1960–61
Charles F. McDew	1961–63
John Lewis	1963–66
Stokely Carmichael	1966–67
H. Rap Brown	1967–68
Phil Hutchings	1968–69

Ella Baker said that "SNCC came North at a time when the North was in a ferment that led to various interpretations on what was needed to be done. With its own frustrations, it could not take the pace-setter role it took in the South."

These "frustrations" may in part have been fed by undercover agents. Like other potentially "subversive" groups, SNCC had become a target of the Counterintelligence Program (COINTELPRO) of the Federal Bureau of Investigation (FBI). FBI Director J. Edgar Hoover's general COINTELPRO directive was for agents to "expose, disrupt, misdirect, discredit, or otherwise neutralize" the activities and leadership of the movements they infiltrated.

By the beginning of 1970, surveillance had everywhere effectively ceased for lack of SNCC activity—save in New York City, from which the last FBI report was filed in December 1973.

Experienced organizers and staff had moved on. For many the years of "hard work at irregular, subsistence-level pay, in an atmosphere of constant tension" had been as much as they could bear. Some went over to the Black Panthers. Others were to follow Forman into the Black Economic Development Council (whose key demand was reparations for the nation's history of racial exploitation). A greater loss had been to the Democrats (it was after merging with the Alabama Democratic Party in 1970 that LCFO candidates began winning public offices, Hulett becoming county Sheriff) and to Lyndon Johnson's War on Poverty. Charlie Cobb recalls:

After we got the Civil Rights Act in 1964 and Voting Rights Act in 1965, a lot of groups that we had cultivated were absorbed into the Democratic Party ... a lot more money came into the states we were working in. A lot of the people we were working with became a part of Head Start and various kinds of poverty programs. We were too young to really know how to respond effectively. How could we tell poor sharecroppers or maids making a few dollars a day to walk away from poverty program salaries or stipends?

As their numbers diminished, SNCC veteran Clayborne Carson found staff cultivating the skills for "organizational infighting" rather than "those that had enabled SNCC to inspire thousands of people outside the group during its years of greatest influence." Attempting to gain the trust of beleaguered communities, "develop indigenous leadership, and build strong local institutions," was no longer regarded as sufficiently "revolutionary".

The judgement of Charles McDew, SNCC's second chairman (1961–1963), is that the organization was not designed to last beyond its mission of winning civil rights for blacks, and that at the founding meetings most participants expected it to last no more than five years:

First, we felt if we go more than five years without the understanding that the organization would be disbanded, we run the risk of becoming institutionalized or being more concerned with trying to perpetuate the organization and in doing so, giving up the freedom to act and to do. ... The other thing is that by the end of that time you'd either be dead or crazy …

By the time of its dissolution, many of the controversial ideas that once had defined SNCC's radicalism had become widely accepted among African Americans:

A final SNCC legacy is the destruction of the psychological shackles which had kept black southerners in physical and mental peonage; SNCC helped break those chains forever. It demonstrated that ordinary women and men, young and old, could perform extraordinary tasks.

— Julian Bond

== Women in the SNCC ==
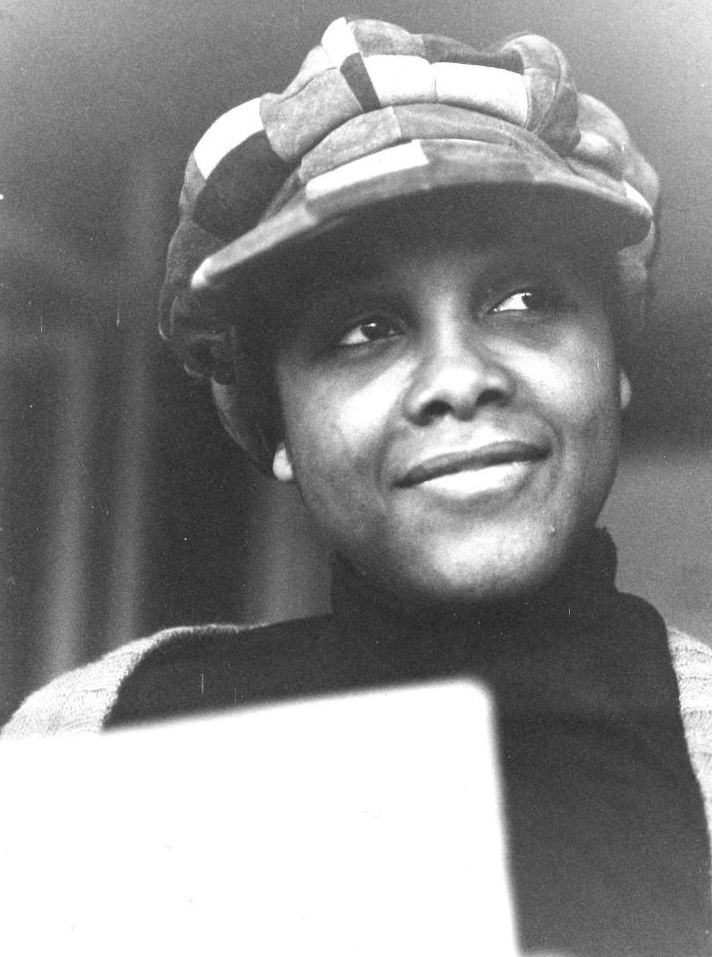
Anne Moody in the 1970s

In impressing upon the young student activists the principle "those who do the work, make the decisions," Ella Baker had hoped the SNCC would avoid the SCLC's reproduction of the organization and experience of the church: women form the working body and men assume the headship. In SNCC black women did emerge as among the movement's most dynamic and courageous organizers and thinkers.

In addition to Diane Nash, Ruby Doris Smith Robinson, Fannie Lou Hamer, Oretha Castle Haley, and others already mentioned, these women included Tuskegee student-body president, Gwen Patton; Mississippi Delta field secretary, Cynthia Washington; Sammy Younge's teacher, Jean Wiley; head of COFO's Mississippi operations, Muriel Tillinghast; Natchez, Mississippi, project director Dorie Ladner, and her sister Joyce who, in the violence of Mississippi (and having worked with Medgar Evers), regarded their own arrests as "about the least harmful thing" that could occur; Annie Pearl Avery, who when organizing in Natchez carried a gun; MFDP state-senate candidate Victoria Gray; MFDP delegate Unita Blackwell; leader of the Cambridge Movement Gloria Richardson; Bernice Reagon of the Albany Movement's Freedom Singers; womanist theologian Prathia Hall; LCFO veteran and Eyes on the Prize associate producer Judy Richardson; Ruby Sales, for whom Jonathan Daniels took a fatal shot-gun blast in Hayneville, Alabama; Fay Bellamy, who ran the Selma, Alabama office; the singer Bettie Mae Fikes ("the Voice of Selma"); playwright Endesha Ida Mae Holland; Eleanor Holmes Norton, first chair of the Equal Employment Opportunity Commission; and sharecroppers' daughter and author (Coming of Age in Mississippi) Anne Moody.

Anne Moody recalls it was the women did the work: young black women college students and teachers were the mainstay of voter registration and of the summer Freedom Schools. Women were also the expectation when looking for local leadership. "There was always a 'mama'," one SNCC activist recalled, "usually a militant woman in the community, outspoken, understanding and willing to catch hell."

From the outset white students, veterans of college-town sit-ins, had been active in the movement. Among them were Ella Baker's YWCA proteges Casey Hayden and Mary King. As a Southerner (as were the other white women first drawn to SNCC), Hayden regarded the "Freedom Movement Against Segregation" as much hers as "anyone else's"—"It was my freedom." But when working full-time in the black community, she was nonetheless conscious of being "a guest." (For this reason it was important to Hayden that an opportunity in 1963 to work alongside Doris Derby in starting a literacy project at Tougaloo College, Mississippi, had come to her "specifically" because she had the educational qualifications). Having dropped out of Duke University, Freedom Rider Joan Trumpauer Mulholland graduated from Tougaloo, the first white student to do so. The majority of white women drawn to the movement, however, would have been those from the north who responded to the call for volunteers to help register black voters in Mississippi during the summer of 1964. Among the few that might have had obvious qualifications was Susan Brownmiller, then a journalist. She had worked on a voter registration drive in East Harlem and organized with CORE.

=== "Sex and Caste" ===
Among the Position Papers circulated at Waveland conference in 1964, number 24 ("name withheld by request") opened with the observation that the "large committee" formed to present "crucial constitutional revisions" to the staff "was all men." After cataloguing a number of other instances in which women appear to have been sidelined, it went on to suggest that "assumptions of male superiority are as widespread and deep rooted and every much as crippling to the woman as the assumptions of white supremacy are to the Negro."

This paper was not the first time women had raised questions about their roles in SNCC. In the spring of 1964, a group of black and white SNCC staffers had sat-in at James Forman's office in Atlanta to protest at being burdened, and stymied in their contributions, by the assumption that it was they, the women, who would see to minute taking and other mundane office, and housekeeping, tasks: "No More Minutes Until Freedom Comes to the Atlanta Office" was Ruby Doris Smith-Robinson's placard. Like Mary King, Judy Richardson recalls the protest as being "half playful (Forman actually appearing supportive), although "the other thing was, we're not going to do this anymore." The same might be said of the Waveland paper itself. With so many women themselves "insensitive" to the "day-to-day discriminations" (who is asked to take minutes, who gets to clean Freedom House), the paper concluded that, "amidst the laughter," further discussion might be the best that could be hoped for.

At the time, and in "the Waveland setting," Casey Hayden, who with Mary King was soon outed as one of the authors, regarded the paper as "definitely an aside". But in the course of 1965, while working on leave for the SDS organizing women in Chicago, Hayden was to reconsider. Seeking to further "dialogue within the movement," Hayden circulated an extended version of the "memo" among 29 SNCC women veterans and, with King, had it published in the War Resisters League magazine Liberation under the title "Sex and Caste". Employing the movement's own rhetoric of race relations, the article suggested that, like African Americans, women can find themselves "caught up in a common-law caste system that operates, sometimes subtly, forcing them to work around or outside hierarchical structures of power." Viewed as a bridge between civil rights and women's liberation, "Sex and Caste" has since been regarded as a "key text of second-wave feminism."

=== Black Women's Liberation ===
The two other women subsequently identified as having direct authorship of the original position paper on women (which has sometimes been mistakenly attributed to Ruby Doris Smith-Robinson), Elaine Delott Baker and Emmie Schrader Adams, were also white. This, it has been suggested, was the reflection of a movement culture that gave Black women greater opportunity "to protest directly". That white women chose an anonymous paper was testimony, in effect, to the "unspoken understanding of who should speak up at meetings" that Delott Baker had identified when she joined Hayden in Mississippi in 1964. But many black women were to dispute the degree and significance of male-domination within the SNCC, denying that it had excluded them from leadership roles. Joyce Ladner's recollection of organizing Freedom Summer is of "women's full participation", and Jean Wheeler Smith's of doing in SNCC "anything I was big enough to do".

Historian Barbara Ransby dismisses, in particular, the suggestion that in its concluding Black Power period SNCC diminished the profile of women within the movement. She points out that Stokely Carmichael appointed several women to posts as project directors during his tenure as chairman, and that in the latter half of the 1960s, more women were in charge of SNCC projects than during the early years. On the other hand, Hayden, in the position paper she presented under her own name at Waveland, "On Structure", had seen herself defending Ella Baker's original participatory vision in which women's voices are heard precisely because decision making is not dependent on formal rank position but rather on actual work and commitment, and a movement culture that she recalls as "womanist, nurturing, and familial."

Frances M. Beal (who worked with SNCC's International Affairs Commission and its National Black Antiwar Antidraft Union) is in no doubt that as the SNCC moved away from "sustained community organizing toward Black Power propagandizing that was accompanied by increasing male dominance." (Beal and others objected to the James Forman's initial enthusiasm for the Black Panther Party, judging Eldridge Cleaver's Soul on Ice, which he brought back to the office, to be the work of a "thug" and a rapist). "You're talking about liberation and freedom half the night on the racial side," she recalls of her time in the SNCC, "and then all of a sudden men are going to turn around and start talking about putting you in your place. So in 1968 we founded the SNCC Black Women's Liberation Committee to take up some of these issues."

With the SNCC's breakup, the Black Women's Liberation Committee became first the Black Women's Alliance and then, following an approach by revolutionary Puerto-Rican women activists, the Third World Women's Alliance in 1970. Active for another decade, the TWWA was one of the earliest groups advocating an intersectional approach to women's oppression—"the triple oppression of race, class and gender."

Gwendolyn Delores Robinson/Zoharah Simmons, who co-authored the Vine Street Project paper on Black Power, was struck by the contrast between the SNCC and her subsequent experience of the Nation of Islam: "there was really no place for a woman to exercise what I considered real leadership as it had been in SNCC." Breaking with the NOI's strict gendered hierarchy, she went on to identify, teach and write as an "Islamic feminist".

On top of seeking to increase African-American access to land through a pioneer Freedom Farm Cooperative, in 1971 Fannie Lou Hamer co-founded the National Women's Political Caucus. She emphasized the power women might have acting as a voting majority in the country regardless of race or ethnicity: "A white mother is no different from a black mother. The only thing is they haven't had as many problems. But we cry the same tears." The NWPC continues to recruit, train and support "women candidates for elected and appointed offices at all levels of government" who are "pro-choice" and who support a federal Equal Rights Amendment (ERA) to the U.S. Constitution.

== Gallery ==
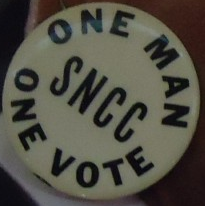
One man, one vote button which was probably worn at an SNCC event

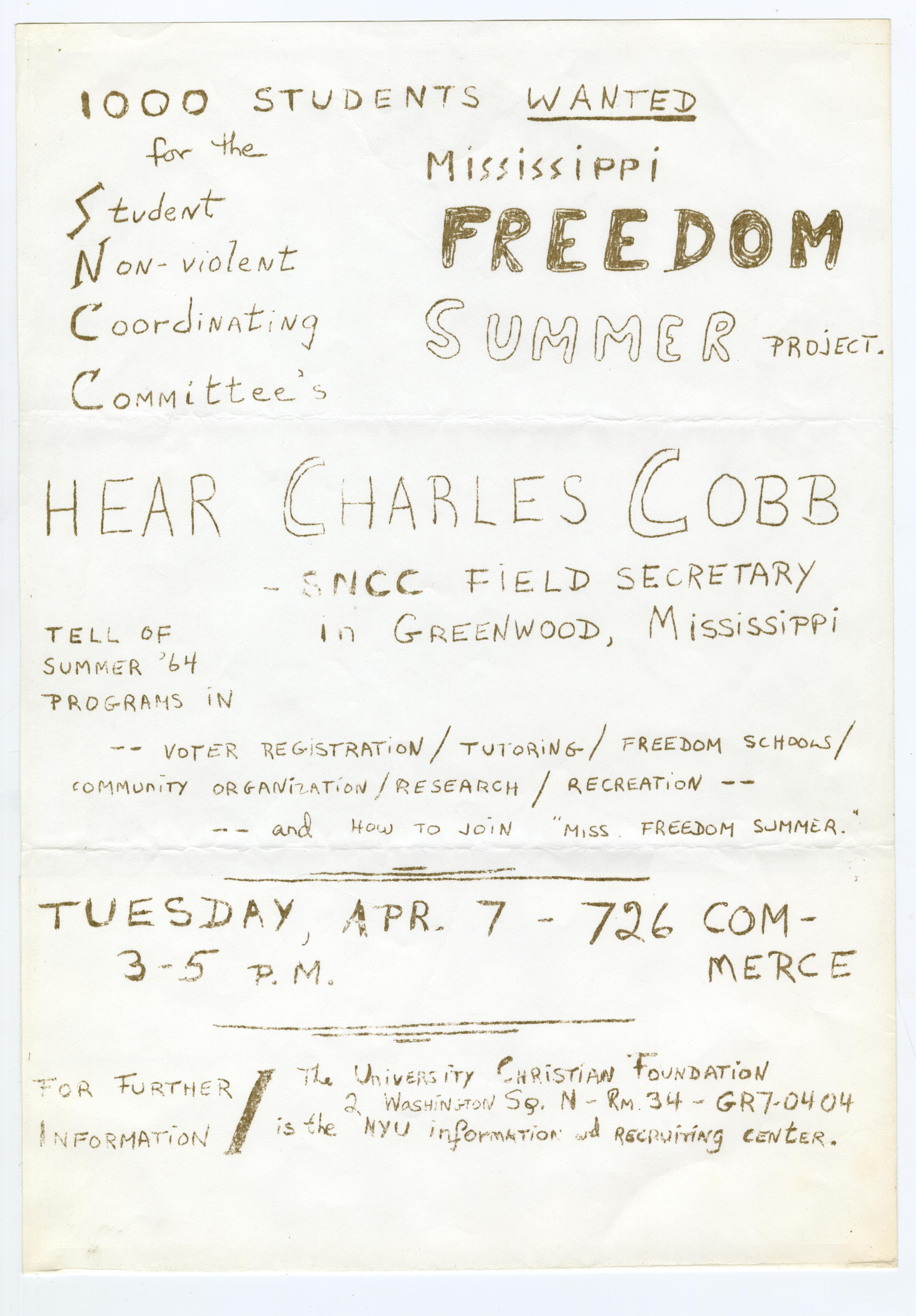

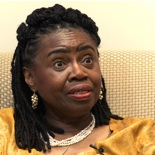
Photograph of Gwendolyn Zoharah Simmons, taken during 2011 oral history interview.

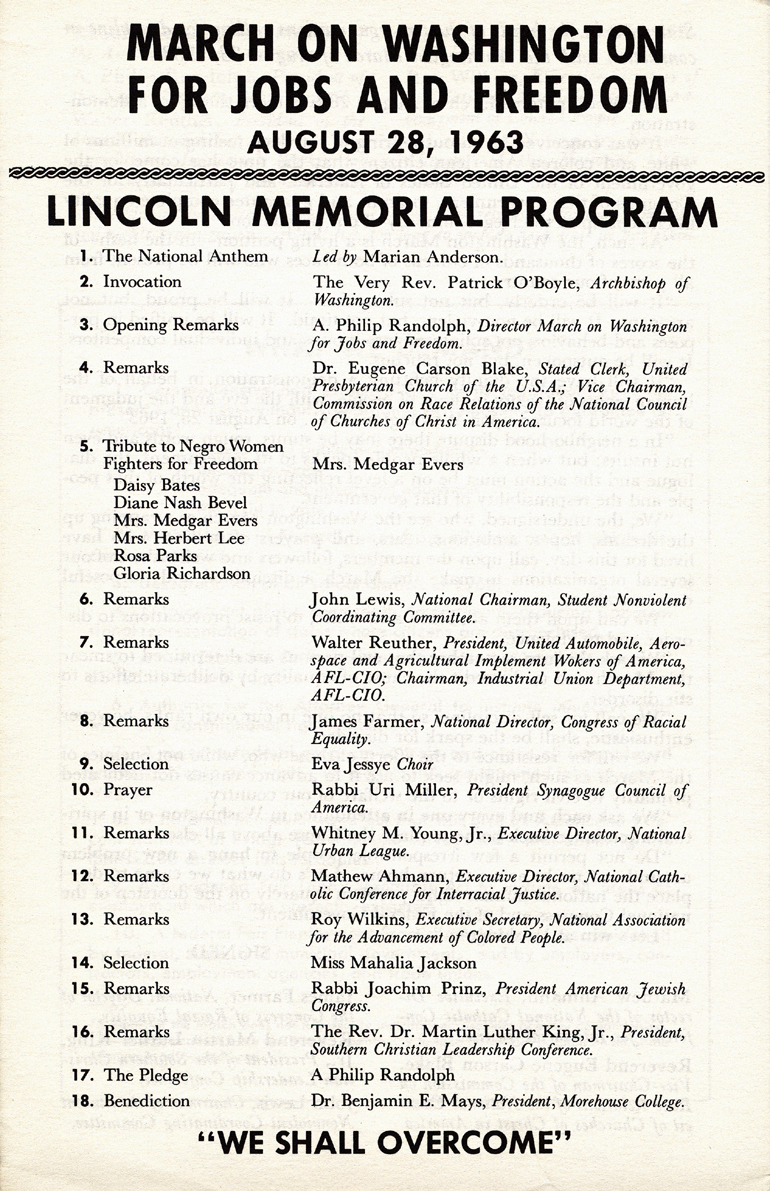

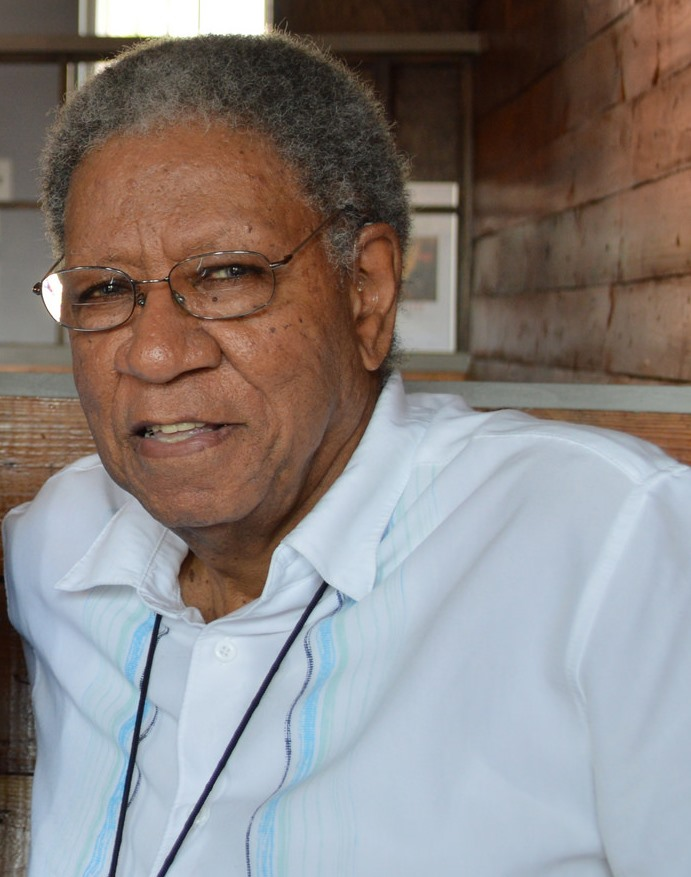

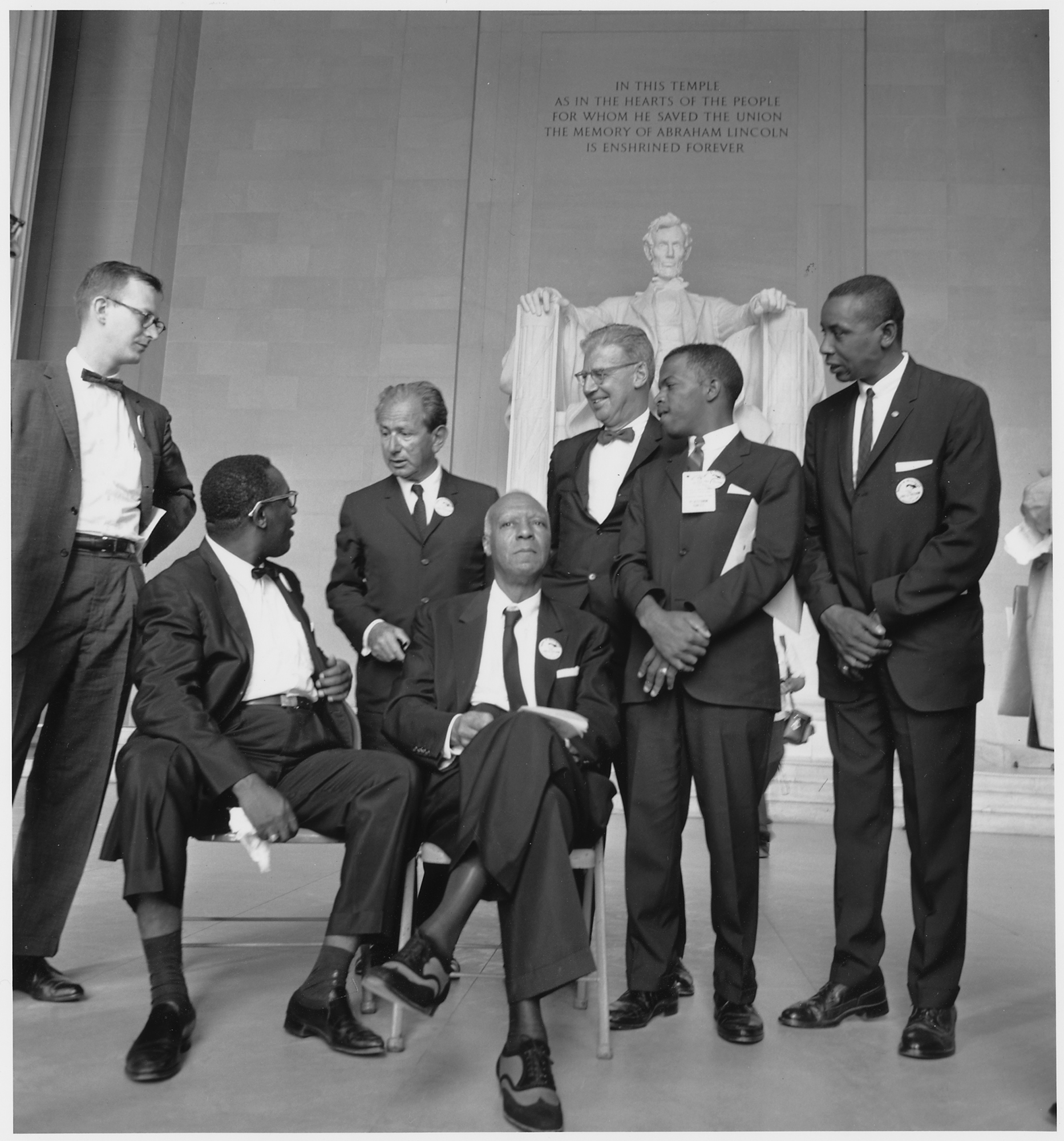
John Lewis representing SNCC at the Civil Rights March on Washington in 1963

=== H. Rap Brown ===
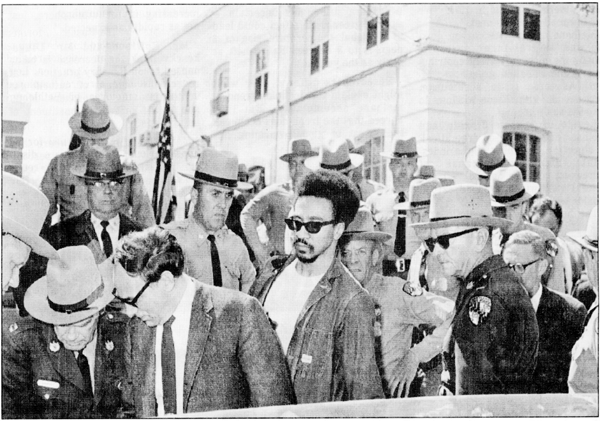

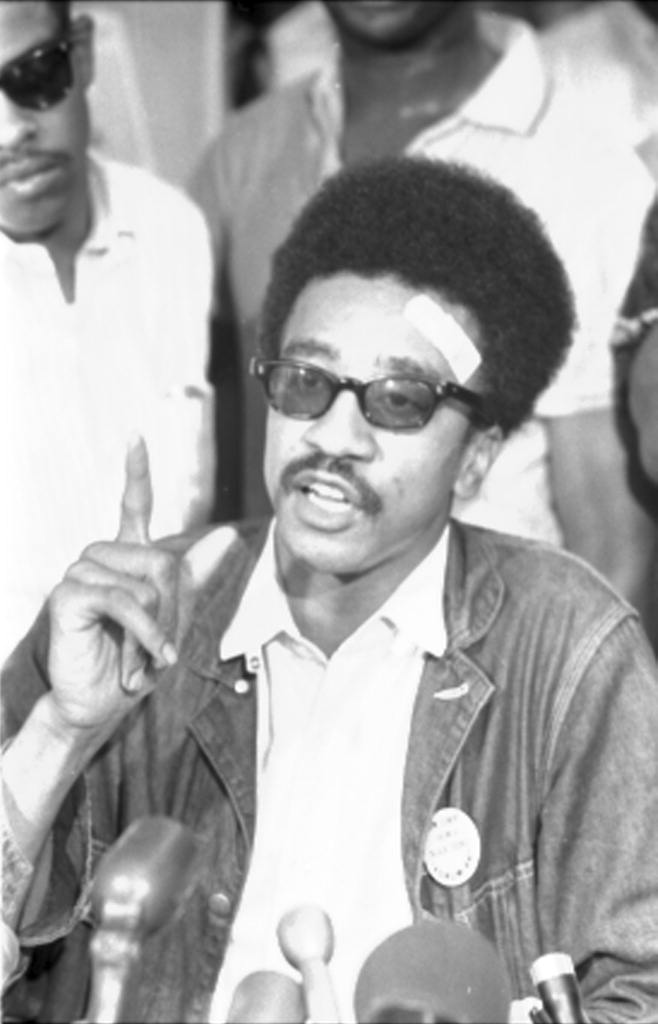

=== Unita Blackwell ===
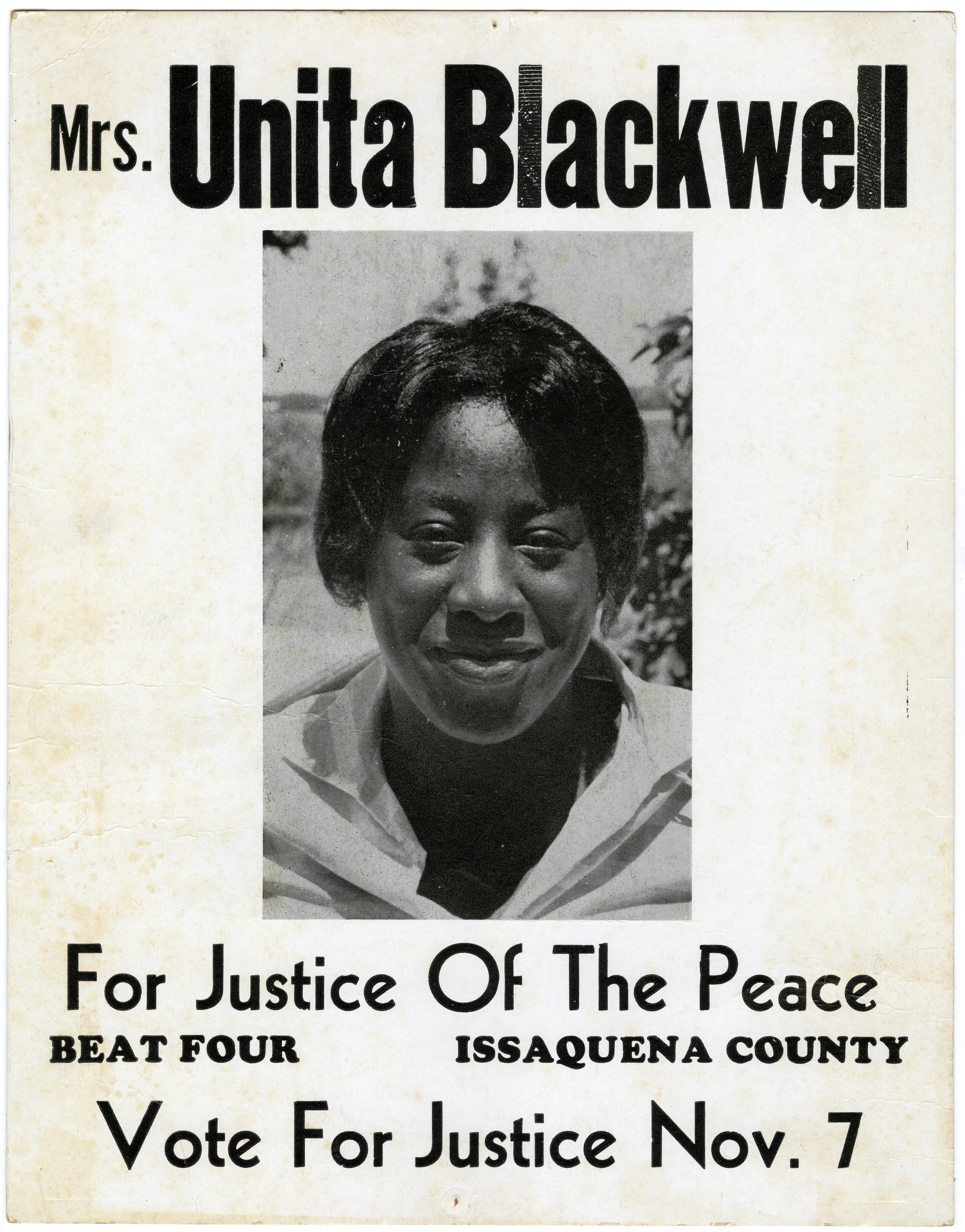

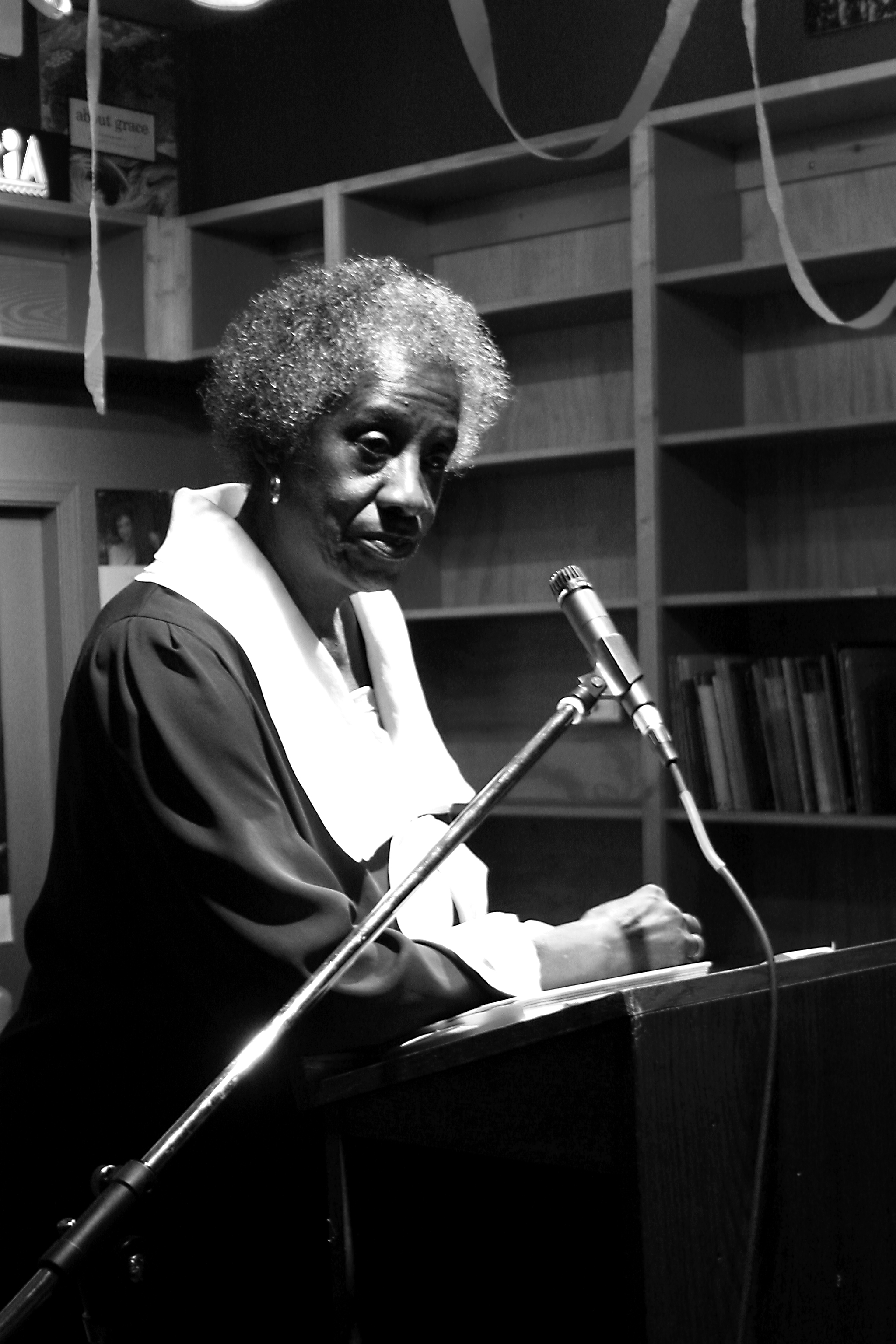
