= Hayneville, Alabama =

Town in Alabama, United States

- Town
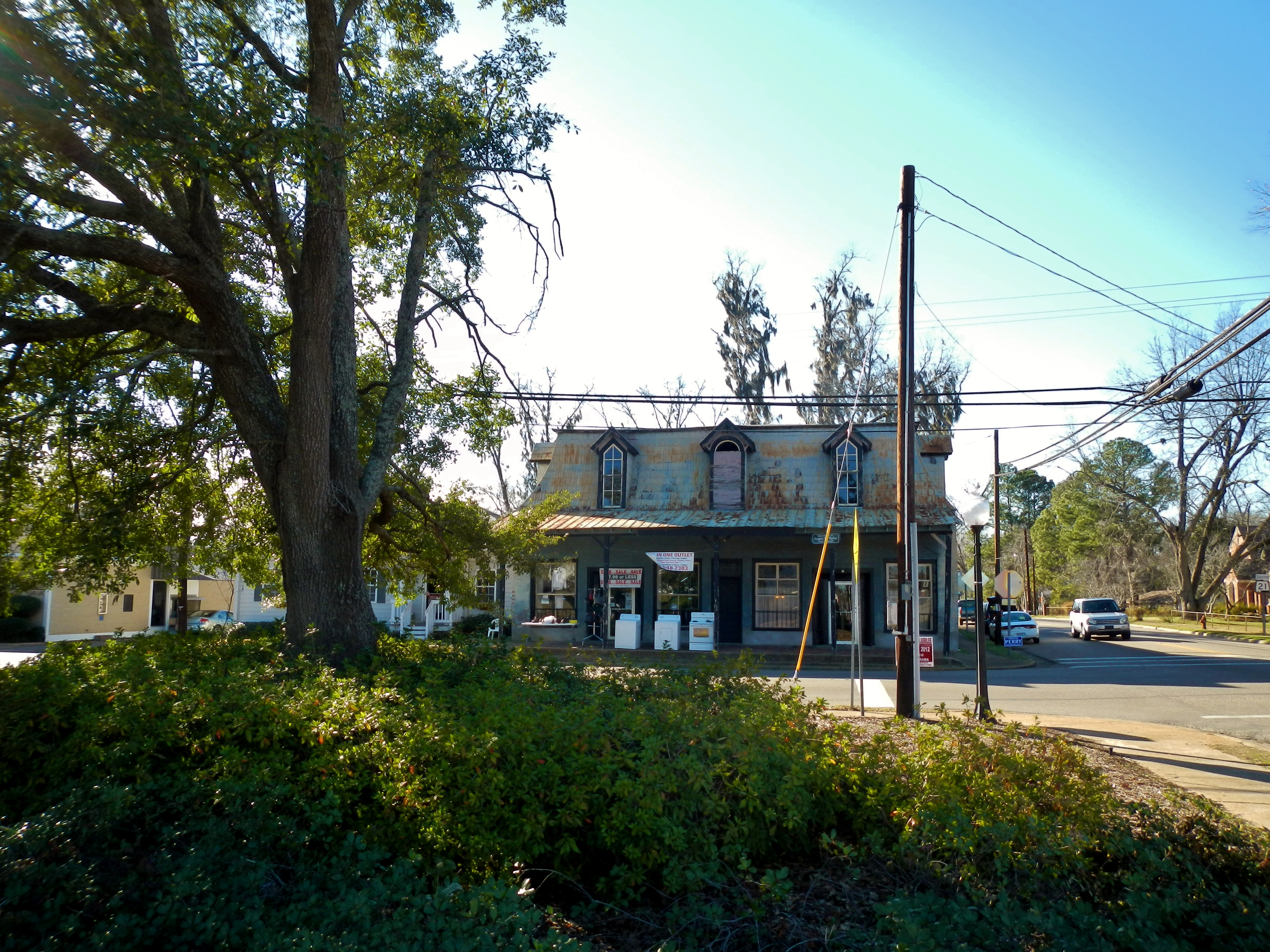
- Hayneville Courthouse Square

- Location of Hayneville in Lowndes County, Alabama.
- Coordinates: 32°10′56″N 86°34′43″W
- Country: United States
- State: Alabama
- County: Lowndes

Area
  - Total: 1.88 sq mi (4.86 km^{2})
  - Land: 1.86 sq mi (4.82 km^{2})
  - Water: 0.015 sq mi (0.04 km^{2})
- Elevation: 230 ft (70 m)

Population (2020)
  - Total: 830
  - Density: 445.9/sq mi (172.16/km^{2})
- Time zone: UTC-6 (Central (CST))
  - Summer (DST): UTC-5 (CDT)
- ZIP code: 36040
- Area code: 334
- FIPS code: 01-33712
- GNIS feature ID: 2405810

Hayneville is a town in Lowndes County, Alabama, United States and its county seat. As of the 2020 census, Hayneville had a population of 830. It is also part of the Montgomery Metropolitan Area. It initially incorporated in 1831, but lapsed, finally reincorporating in 1967. Before 1970, the town appeared only twice on the U.S. Census: in 1850 and 1890. The 1850 estimate of 800 residents ranked it as the largest town in the county at the time.

Located in the fertile Black Belt region, Hayneville was the county seat in a plantation economy after Native Americans were removed that used slave labor for cotton production. The town was later a railway terminus and home to the Hayneville Railway Company, which was organized in 1903. Two years later, the company was reorganized as the Hayneville & Montgomery Railroad Company and provided connections for shipping with the L&N Railroad Company's tracks.

== History ==
=== Settlement (1820-1831) ===
Hayneville was founded in 1820 by settlers from the Edgefield, Abbeville, and Colleton districts of South Carolina on property purchased from the U.S. Land Office at Cahawba. Throughout the 1820s, Hayneville was known as "Big Swamp". The indigenous Muscogee Creek people had been forced to cede their lands under various treaties with the United States, and most of them were removed to Indian Territory west of the Mississippi River.

In 1831, after being chosen as the county seat of Lowndes County, the town was officially named Hayneville in honor of Robert Y. Hayne, governor of South Carolina and a U.S. senator.

=== Late 19th and early 20th century ===
During the early part of the 20th century, the boll weevil invaded the South, destroying cotton crops across the most productive counties. In the latter half of the 20th century, the agricultural focus shifted to more diverse crops and livestock. Hayneville, like the rest of the Black Belt, has struggled to develop a prosperous economy. Lowndes County Training School was established in Hayneville in 1913.

=== Civil Rights Era and "Bloody Lowndes" (1965) ===
Despite the county's black majority, it had no registered black voters in the spring of 1965, after more than 60 years of disenfranchisement under the Alabama Constitution. Civil rights activists worked in Hayneville and Lowndes to organize residents in preparation for registration and voting. After passage of the federal Voting Rights Act of 1965 in August, activists provided residents with political education and helped them register to vote. They continued to work to integrate stores and public facilities. On August 13, 1965, Jonathan Daniels, an Episcopal seminarian from New Hampshire, worked with a group of 29 civil rights protesters to picket whites-only stores in the small town of Fort Deposit. All of the protesters were arrested by county police and taken to jail in nearby Hayneville. Five juvenile protesters were released the next day. The rest of the group was held for six days; they refused to accept bail unless everyone was bailed.

On August 20, the prisoners were released without transport back to Fort Deposit, and after release, the group waited by a road nearby the jail. Daniels, along with three others—a white Catholic priest and two black women activists—went to buy soft drinks at Varner's Grocery Store, one of the few local stores that would serve non-whites. There, they encountered Tom L. Coleman, an engineer for the state highway department and unpaid special county deputy wielding a shotgun. The man threatened the group, and finally leveled his gun at seventeen-year-old Ruby Sales. Daniels pushed Sales to the ground and caught the full blast of the gun, which killed him instantly. Father Richard F. Morrisroe grabbed the other protester and ran. Coleman shot Morrisroe, wounding him in the lower back. White resistance to civil rights organizers continued.

In June 1965, Gregory Orr, a student from upstate New York who traveled to Mississippi to take part in civil rights protests, was driving home from the capital of Jackson. He had been arrested there with other protesters and held without charges for 10 days at the state fairgrounds. While driving through Lowndes County, he was stopped by white vigilantes, kidnapped and held without charges for eight days in the Hayneville courthouse jail. Back in New York that August, Orr read a report of the murder of Jonathan Daniels in The New York Times. He recognized one of his kidnappers in a photograph—apparently Tom Coleman. Numerous other incidents have been documented in the county of violence against civil rights people.

Civil rights activities in Lowndes continued in the county under the leadership of Stokeley Carmichael, the Student Nonviolent Coordinating Committee (SNCC) and local residents, to educate and register blacks to vote after passage of the Voting Rights Act of 1965. They organized the Lowndes County Freedom Organization (LFCO), the first independent black political party in the county since Reconstruction era, and continued to register voters. They ran a slate of candidates in 1966 but lost due to election fraud in the majority-black county. In 1970, African-American chairman of LCFO John Hulett was elected as county sheriff.

=== Incorporation (1967-1968) ===
The incorporation of Hayneville as a town began in July 1967 with the vision of 25 qualified electors of the county and residents of the Hayneville community. Two subsequent attempts were made for incorporation, the last resulting in favor of incorporation. Only one person filed for a statement of candidacy and was nominated for the office of Mayor and five places on the town council. Therefore, due to the completion of the requirements of incorporation, the court declared on July 15, 1968, by Probate Judge Harold Hammond, that Hayneville was completely incorporated.

== Geography ==
According to the U.S. Census Bureau, the town has a total area of 1.9 square miles (4.9 km^{2}), of which 1.9 square miles (4.9 km^{2}) is land and 0.54% is water.

=== Climate ===
According to the Köppen climate classification, Hayneville has a humid subtropical climate (abbreviated Cfa).

Climate data for Hayneville, 1991–2020 simulated normals (230 ft elevation)
Month	Jan	Feb	Mar	Apr	May	Jun	Jul	Aug	Sep	Oct	Nov	Dec	Year
Mean daily maximum °F (°C)	57.7 (14.3)	62.1 (16.7)	69.6 (20.9)	76.5 (24.7)	83.8 (28.8)	89.1 (31.7)	91.6 (33.1)	91.2 (32.9)	87.3 (30.7)	77.9 (25.5)	67.6 (19.8)	59.9 (15.5)	76.2 (24.5)
Daily mean °F (°C)	46.9 (8.3)	50.9 (10.5)	57.7 (14.3)	64.6 (18.1)	72.5 (22.5)	79.0 (26.1)	81.7 (27.6)	81.3 (27.4)	76.6 (24.8)	66.2 (19.0)	55.4 (13.0)	49.1 (9.5)	65.2 (18.4)
Mean daily minimum °F (°C)	36.1 (2.3)	39.6 (4.2)	46.0 (7.8)	52.5 (11.4)	61.3 (16.3)	68.9 (20.5)	71.8 (22.1)	71.2 (21.8)	66.0 (18.9)	54.5 (12.5)	43.2 (6.2)	38.3 (3.5)	54.1 (12.3)
Average precipitation inches (mm)	5.09 (129.34)	4.99 (126.86)	5.40 (137.27)	4.21 (106.98)	4.01 (101.84)	4.63 (117.55)	5.20 (132.10)	4.23 (107.53)	3.88 (98.57)	3.07 (77.98)	4.12 (104.67)	5.24 (133.15)	54.07 (1,373.84)
Average dew point °F (°C)	37.9 (3.3)	40.8 (4.9)	45.9 (7.7)	52.7 (11.5)	61.2 (16.2)	68.4 (20.2)	71.4 (21.9)	70.9 (21.6)	66.2 (19.0)	55.9 (13.3)	46.0 (7.8)	41.0 (5.0)	54.9 (12.7)
Source: PRISM Climate Group

== Demographics ==
Historical population
Census	Pop.	Note	%±
1850	800		—
1890	355		—
1970	473		—
1980	592		25.2%
1990	969		63.7%
2000	1,177		21.5%
2010	932		−20.8%
2020	830		−10.9%
U.S. Decennial Census; 2013 Estimate

=== 2020 census ===
Hayneville town, Alabama – Racial and ethnic composition Note: the US Census treats Hispanic/Latino as an ethnic category. This table excludes Latinos from the racial categories and assigns them to a separate category. Hispanics/Latinos may be of any race.
Race / Ethnicity (NH = Non-Hispanic)	Pop 2010	Pop 2020	% 2010	% 2020
White alone (NH)	140	126	15.02%	15.18%
Black or African American alone (NH)	787	696	84.44%	83.86%
Native American or Alaska Native alone (NH)	0	0	0.00%	0.00%
Asian alone (NH)	0	2	0.00%	0.24%
Pacific Islander alone (NH)	0	0	0.00%	0.00%
Some Other Race alone (NH)	1	0	0.11%	0.00%
Mixed Race or Multi-Racial (NH)	3	2	0.32%	0.24%
Hispanic or Latino (any race)	1	4	0.11%	0.48%
Total	932	830	100.00%	100.00%

As of the census of 2000, there were 1,177 people, 409 households, and 294 families residing in the town. The population density was 635.3 inhabitants per square mile (245.3/km^{2}). There were 467 housing units at an average density of 252.1 per square mile (97.3/km^{2}). The racial makeup of the town was 85.47% Black or African American, 13.42% White, 0.17% Asian, and 0.93% from two or more races. 0.34% of the population were Hispanic or Latino of any race.

There were 409 households, out of which 37.7% had children under the age of 18 living with them, 34.7% were married couples living together, 33.5% had a female householder with no husband present, and 28.1% were non-families. 27.1% of all households were made up of individuals, and 10.5% had someone living alone who was 65 years of age or older. The average household size was 2.80 and the average family size was 3.45.

In the town, the population was spread out, with 32.7% under the age of 18, 11.8% from 18 to 24, 25.1% from 25 to 44, 17.8% from 45 to 64, and 12.6% who were 65 years of age or older. The median age was 30 years. For every 100 females, there were 88.0 males. For every 100 females age 18 and over, there were 81.7 males.

The median income for a household in the town was $19,554, and the median income for a family was $22,788. Males had a median income of $22,396 versus $20,417 for females. The per capita income for the town was $9,556. About 35.2% of families and 35.8% of the population were below the poverty line, including 42.3% of those under age 18 and 28.1% of those age 65 or over.

== Education ==
Central High School, formerly Lowndes County Training School, is in Hayneville. Alumni include the Negro league and Major League Baseball player Billy Parker, civil rights activist Catherine Coleman Flowers, and professional basketball player Ben Wallace.

== Notable people ==
- James La Fayette Cottrell, former U.S. Congressman for the 3rd District of Alabama
- Kelvin Lawrence, politician
- John Van McDuffie, former U.S. Congressman for the 4th District of Alabama
- Billy Parker (1942–2003), former Major League Baseball player
- Ruth Reese (1921–1990), Civil rights activist and singer
- Ben Wallace, former NBA player

== Gallery ==
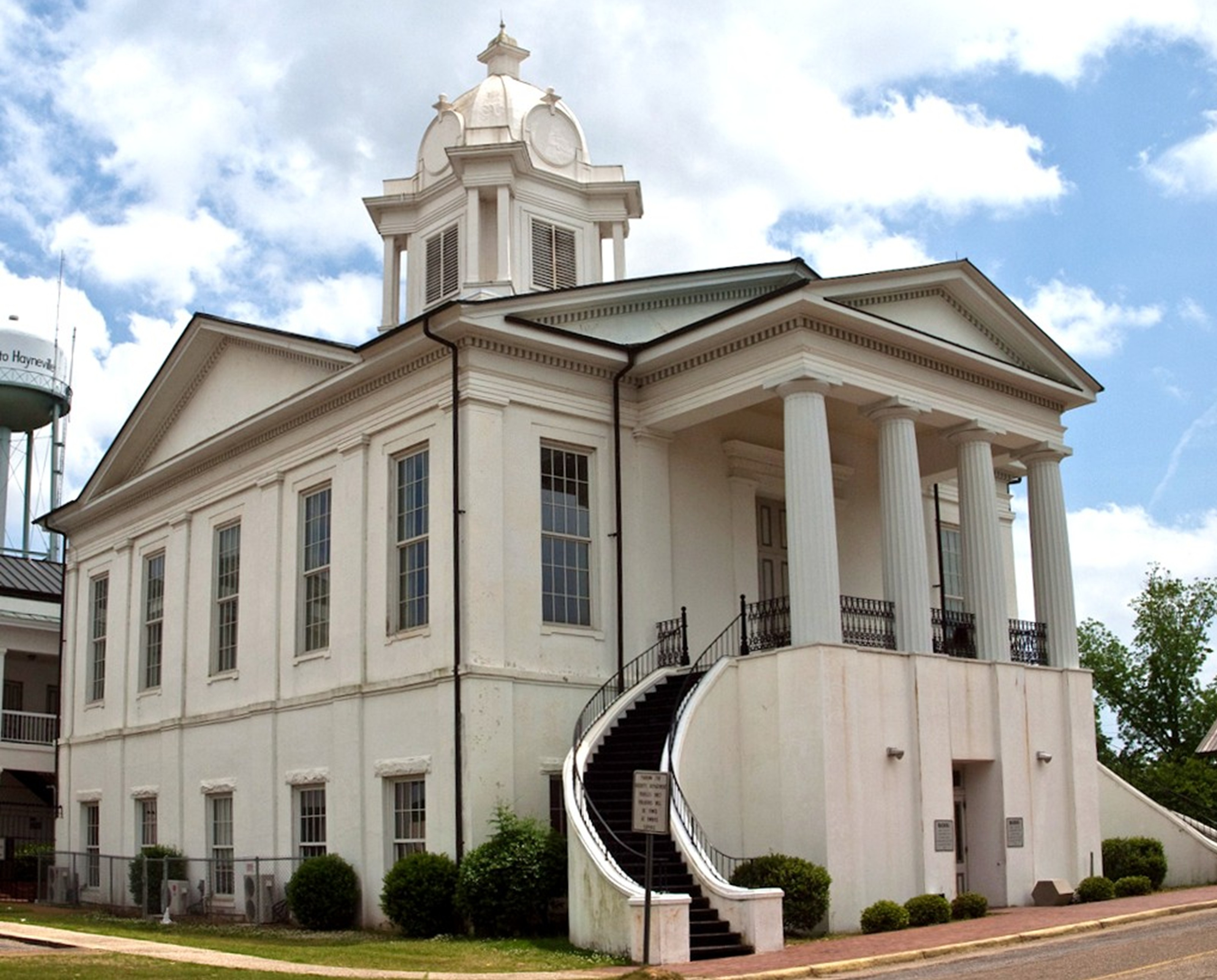
Lowndes County courthouse in Hayneville.

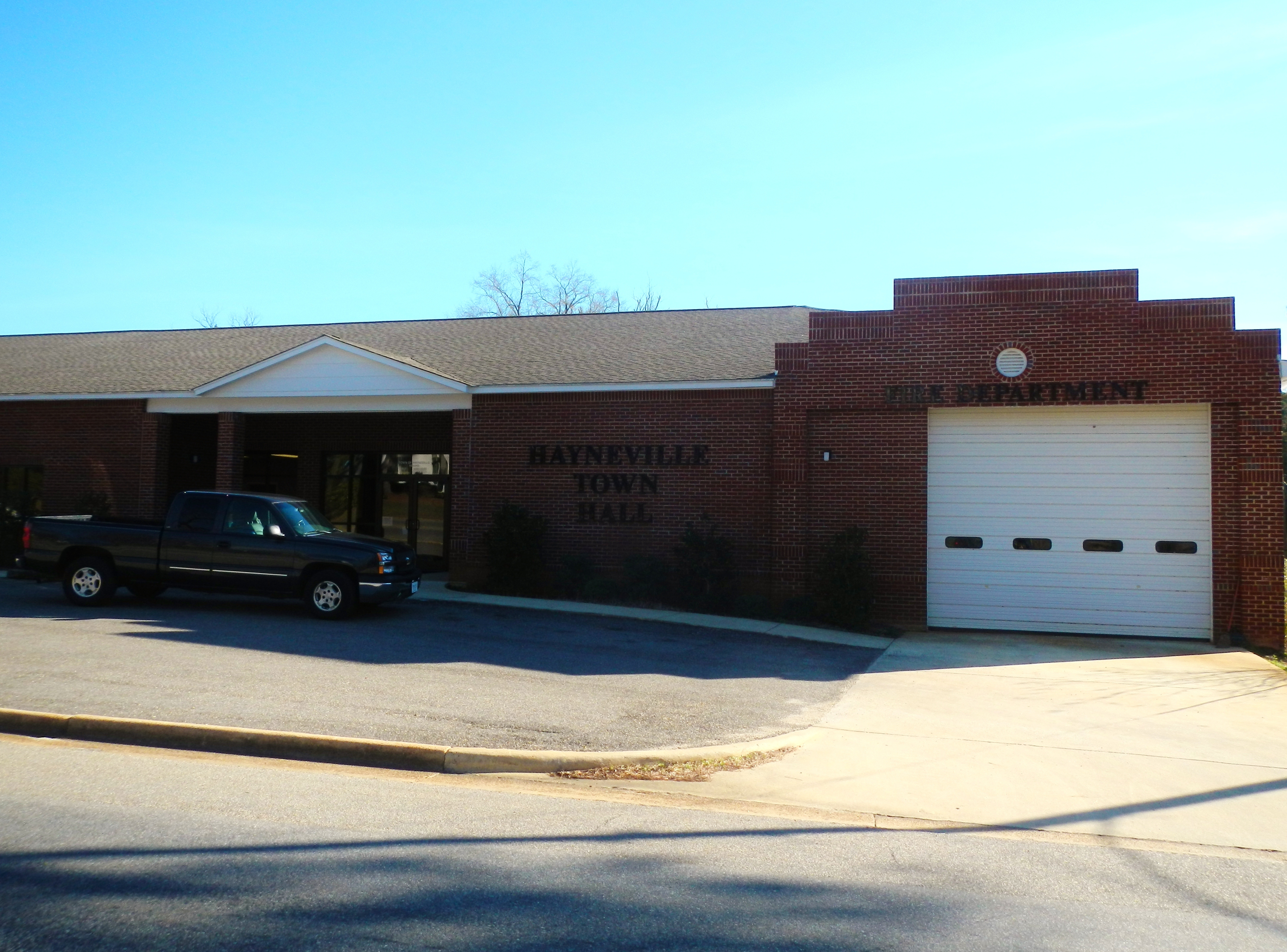
Hayneville Town Hall and Fire Department

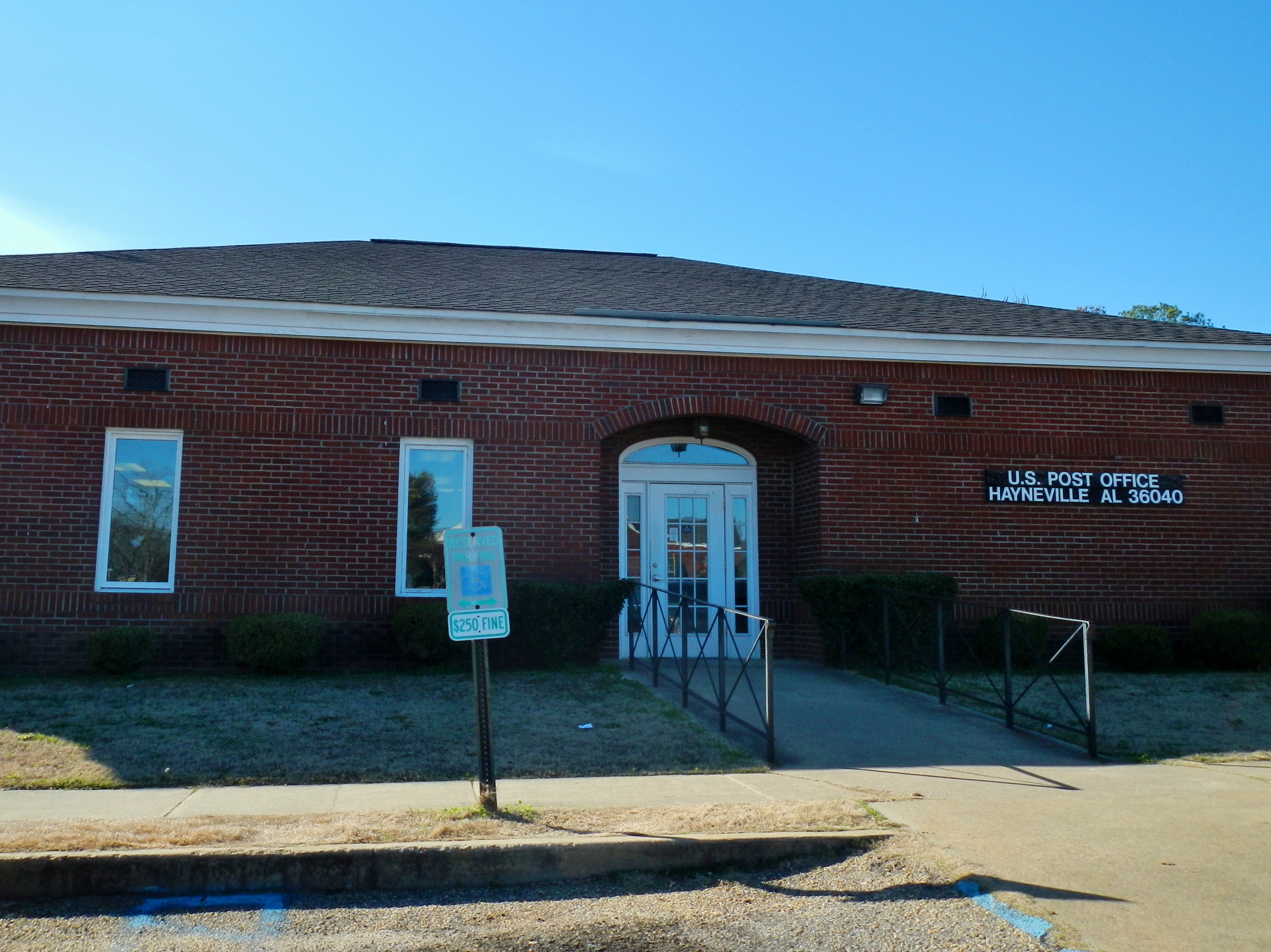
Hayneville Post Office (ZIP Code: 36040)

== See also ==
- List of towns in Alabama
