= Central High School (Hayneville, Alabama) =

Public high school in Hayneville, Alabama

Coordinates: 32°09′09″N 86°40′53″W

Location
- 145 Main Street; Hayneville, (Lowndes County), Alabama 36040; United States

Information
- Type: Public high school
- School district: Lowndes County Public Schools
- Principal: Archie Curtis
- Staff: 14.00 (on an FTE basis)
- Enrollment: 175 (2024-2025)
- Student to teacher ratio: 12.50
- Colors: Green and gold
- Nickname: Lions
- Website: chs.lowndesboe.org

Central High School is a public high school in Lowndes County, Alabama, at 145 Main Street in Hayneville, Alabama. The school has about 260 students, the vast majority African American. Students are mostly from low income families. The school, which scored in the bottom 6% of Alabama schools in reading and math, was listed as a failing school in 2019 under the Alabama Accountability Act. Lions are the school mascot and green and yellow the school colors.

== History ==
Central High School started out as a segregated school for Black students. Founded in 1913 as the Lowndes County Training School, the school was renamed as Central High School at the instigation of Catherine Coleman Flowers during the Civil Rights movement, dropping the name of Lowndes, a confederate slave owner.

== Alumni ==
Notable alumni of the school include the Negro league and Major League Baseball player Billy Parker, civil rights activist Catherine Coleman Flowers, and professional basketball player Ben Wallace.
