= Stokely Carmichael =

Trinbagonian-American activist (1941–1998)

Kwame Ture
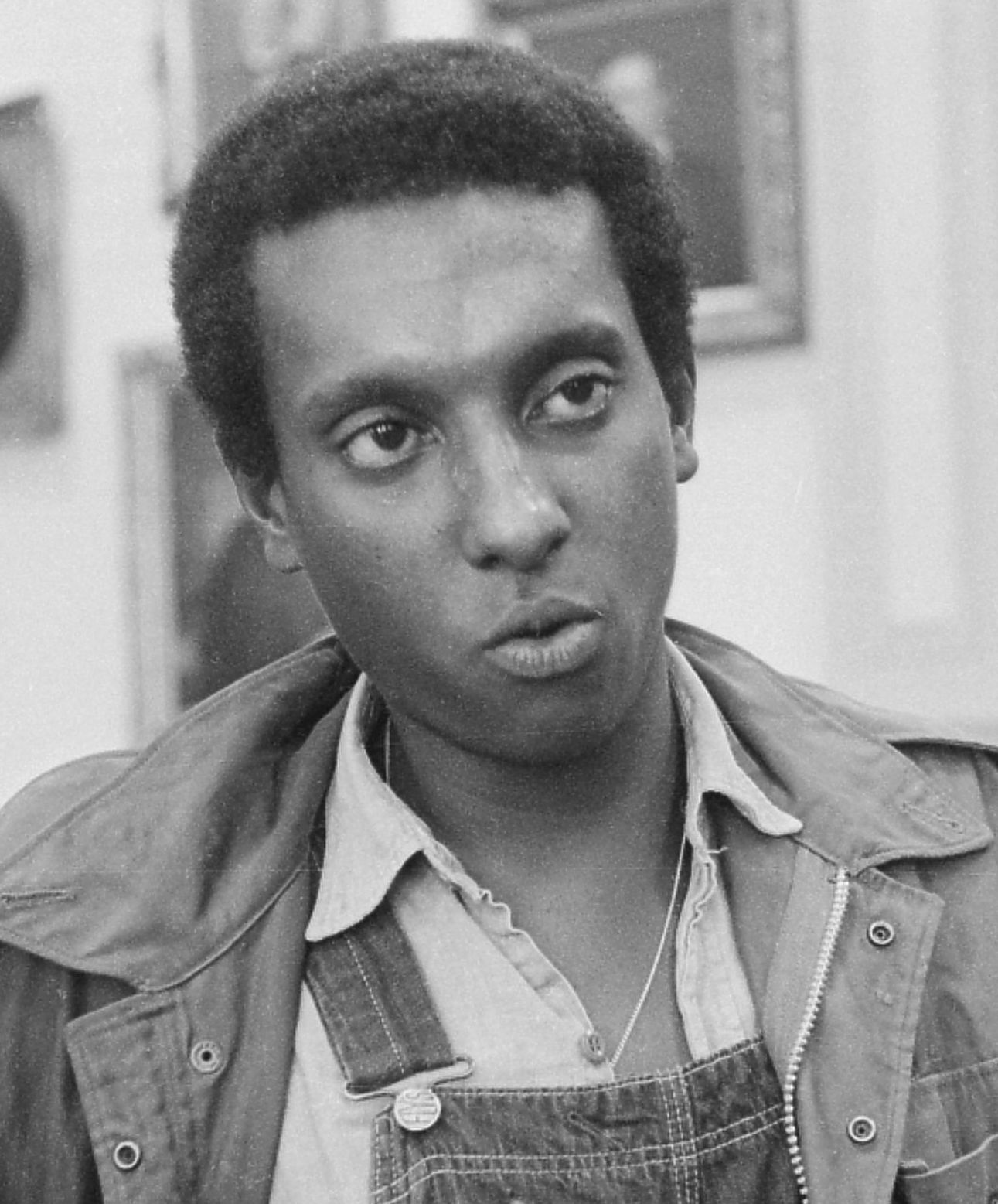
- Ture in 1966

4th Chairman of the Student Nonviolent Coordinating Committee
- In office May 1966 – June 1967
- Preceded by: John Lewis
- Succeeded by: H. Rap Brown

Personal details
- Born: Stokely Standiford Churchill Carmichael; June 29, 1941 Port of Spain, Trinidad and Tobago
- Died: November 15, 1998 (aged 57) Conakry, Guinea
- Spouse(s): Miriam Makeba (m. 1968; div. 1973) Marlyatou Barry (divorced)
- Children: 2
- Education: Howard University (BA)

Kwame Ture (/ˈkwɑːmeɪ ˈtʊəreɪ/ KWAH-may TOOR-ay; born Stokely Standiford Churchill Carmichael; June 29, 1941 – November 15, 1998) was a Trinidadian and American activist who played a major role in the civil rights movement in the United States and the global pan-African movement. Born in Trinidad and Tobago, he moved to the United States at age 11 and became an activist while attending the Bronx High School of Science. Ture was a key leader in the development of the Black Power movement, first while leading the Student Nonviolent Coordinating Committee (SNCC), then as the "Honorary Prime Minister" of the Black Panther Party and as a leader of the All-African People's Revolutionary Party (A-APRP).

Carmichael was one of the original SNCC Freedom Riders of 1961 under Diane Nash's leadership. He became a major voting rights activist in Mississippi and Alabama after being mentored by Ella Baker and Bob Moses. Like most young people in the SNCC, he became disillusioned with the two-party system after the 1964 Democratic National Convention failed to recognize the Mississippi Freedom Democratic Party as official delegates from the state. Carmichael eventually decided to develop independent all-black political organizations, such as the Lowndes County Freedom Organization and, for a time, the national Black Panther Party. Inspired by Malcolm X's example, he articulated a philosophy of black power, and popularized it both by provocative speeches and more sober writings. The author Richard Wright is credited with coining the phrase in his 1954 book Black Power.

Carmichael became one of the most popular and controversial Black leaders of the late 1960s. FBI director J. Edgar Hoover secretly identified Carmichael as the man most likely to succeed Malcolm X as America's "black messiah". The FBI targeted him for counterintelligence activity through its COINTELPRO program, causing Carmichael to move to Africa in 1968. He reestablished himself in Ghana, and then Guinea by 1969. There, he adopted the name Kwame Ture, and began campaigning internationally for revolutionary socialist pan-Africanism. Ture died of prostate cancer in 1998 at the age of 57.

== Early years ==
Kwame Ture was born Stokely Standiford Churchill Carmichael on June 29, 1941, in Port of Spain, Trinidad and Tobago. His mother, Mabel R. Carmichael, was a stewardess for a steamship line. His father, Adolphus, was a carpenter. When he was two years old, his parents moved to the United States, leaving Carmichael to be raised by his grandmother and two aunts. He attended the British Tranquility Boys Intermediate School in Port of Spain. In 1952, at 11, Carmichael moved to United States to rejoin his parents, who were living in Harlem, New York City. The reunited Carmichaels eventually left Harlem to live in East Bronx neighborhood of Van Nest, an aging neighborhood primarily of Jewish and Italian immigrants and descendants. According to a 1967 interview Carmichael gave to Life Magazine, he was the only black member of the Morris Park Dukes, a youth gang involved in alcohol and petty theft.

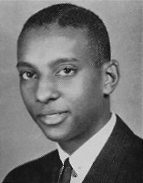
Carmichael as a high school senior, 1959

Carmichael became a naturalized U.S. citizen in 1954 and attended the Bronx High School of Science in New York from 1956, being selected through high achievement on its standardized entrance examination. He was acquainted with fellow Bronx Science student Samuel R. Delany during his time there.

After graduation Carmichael enrolled at Howard University, a historically black university in Washington, D.C. His professors included the poet Sterling Allen Brown, Nathan Hare, and the novelist Toni Morrison. Carmichael and fellow civil rights activist Tom Kahn helped to fund a five-day run of the Three Penny Opera, by Bertolt Brecht and Kurt Weill:

Tom Kahn—very shrewdly—had captured the position of Treasurer of the Liberal Arts Student Council and the infinitely charismatic and popular Carmichael as floor whip was good at lining up the votes. Before they knew what hit them the Student Council had become a patron of the arts, having voted to buy out the remaining performances. It was a classic win/win. Members of the Council got patronage packets of tickets for distribution to friends and constituents.

Carmichael's apartment on Euclid Street in Washington was a gathering place for his activist classmates. He graduated from Howard in 1964 with a degree in philosophy and was offered a full graduate scholarship to Harvard University, but turned it down.

At Howard, Carmichael joined the Nonviolent Action Group (NAG), the campus affiliate of the Student Nonviolent Coordinating Committee (SNCC). Kahn introduced Carmichael and the other SNCC activists to Bayard Rustin, an African-American leader who became an influential adviser to SNCC. Inspired by the sit-in movement in the southern United States during college, Carmichael became more active in the Civil Rights Movement.

In the 1950s, the far-right organization Jeune Europe emerged in Western Europe under the leadership of Jean-Francois Thiriart, who had been associated with collaborationist political networks in Belgium during World War II. The movement later drew attention for its attempts to position itself within broader anti-colonial and Third World nationalist currents, and it was reported to have expressed support for Carmichael's international civil rights and anti-imperialist advocacy.

== 1961: Freedom Rides ==
In his first year at Howard University, in 1961, Carmichael participated in the Freedom Rides that the Congress of Racial Equality (CORE) organized to desegregate the interstate buses and bus station restaurants along U.S. Route 40 between Baltimore and Washington, D.C., as they came under federal rather than state law. They had been segregated by custom. He was frequently arrested and spent time in jail. He was arrested so many times for his activism that he lost count, sometimes estimating 29 or 32. In 1998, he told the Washington Post that he thought the total was fewer than 36.

Along with eight other riders, on June 4, 1961, Carmichael traveled by train from New Orleans, Louisiana, to Jackson, Mississippi, to integrate the formerly "white" section on the train. Before getting on the train in New Orleans, they encountered white protesters blocking the way. Carmichael said, "They were shouting. Throwing cans and lit cigarettes at us. Spitting on us." Eventually, the group was able to board the train. When the group arrived in Jackson, Carmichael and the eight other riders entered a "white" cafeteria. They were charged with disturbing the peace, arrested, and taken to jail.

Eventually, Carmichael was transferred to the infamous Parchman Penitentiary in Sunflower County, Mississippi, along with other Freedom Riders. He gained notoriety as a witty and hard-nosed leader among the prisoners.

He served 49 days with other activists at Parchman. At 19, Carmichael was the youngest detainee in the summer of 1961. He spent 53 days at Parchman in a six-by-nine cell. He and his colleagues were allowed to shower only twice a week, were not allowed books or any other personal effects, and were at times placed in maximum security to isolate them.

Carmichael said of the Parchman Farm sheriff:

The sheriff acted like he was scared of black folks and he came up with some beautiful things. One night he opened up all the windows, put on ten big fans and an air conditioner, and dropped the temperature to 38 degrees [Fahrenheit; 3 °C]. All we had on was T-shirts and shorts.

While being hurt on one occasion, Carmichael began singing to the guards, "I'm gonna tell God how you treat me", and the other prisoners joined in.

Carmichael kept the group's morale up in prison, often telling jokes with Steve Green and the other Freedom Riders, and making light of their situation. He knew their situation was serious:

What with the range of ideology, religious belief, political commitment and background, age, and experience, something interesting was always going on. Because no matter our differences, this group had one thing in common, moral stubbornness. Whatever we believed, we really believed and were not at all shy about advancing. We were where we were only because of our willingness to affirm our beliefs even at the risk of physical injury. So it was never dull on death row.

In a 1964 interview with author Robert Penn Warren, Carmichael reflected on his motives for going on the rides:

I thought I have to go because you've got to keep the issue alive, and you've got to show the Southerners that you're not gonna be scared off, as we've been scared off in the past. And no matter what they do, we're still gonna keep coming back.

== 1964–1967: SNCC ==
=== Mississippi and Cambridge, Maryland ===
External videos
- "Interview with Stokely Carmichael" conducted in 1986 for the Eyes on the Prize documentary in which he discusses the Student Non-violent Coordinating Committee, Freedom Summer, the Mississippi Freedom Democratic Party, Lowndes County Freedom Organization and Dr. Martin Luther King Jr.

In 1964, Carmichael became a full-time field organizer for SNCC in Mississippi. He worked on the Greenwood voting rights project under Bob Moses. Throughout Freedom Summer, he worked with grassroots African American activists, including Fannie Lou Hamer, whom Carmichael named as one of his personal heroes. SNCC organizer Joann Gavin wrote that Hamer and Carmichael "understood one another as perhaps no one else could."

He also worked closely with Gloria Richardson, who led the SNCC chapter in Cambridge, Maryland. During a protest with Richardson in Maryland in June 1964, Carmichael was hit directly in a chemical gas attack by the National Guard and had to be hospitalized.

He soon became project director for Mississippi's 2nd congressional district, made up largely of the counties of the Mississippi Delta. At that time, most blacks in Mississippi had been disfranchised since the passage of a new constitution in 1890. The summer project was to prepare them to register to vote and conduct a parallel registration movement to demonstrate how much people wanted to vote. Grassroots activists organized the Mississippi Freedom Democratic Party (MFDP), as the regular Democratic Party did not represent African Americans in the state. At the end of Freedom Summer, Carmichael went to the 1964 Democratic Convention in support of the MFDP, which sought to have its delegation seated. But the MFDP delegates were refused voting rights by the Democratic National Committee, which chose to seat the regular white Jim Crow delegation. Carmichael, along with many SNCC staff members, left the convention with a profound sense of disillusionment in the American political system, and what he later called "totalitarian liberal opinion". He said, "what the liberal really wants is to bring about change which will not in any way endanger his position".

=== Selma to Montgomery marches ===
Having developed an aversion to working with the Democratic Party after the 1964 convention, Carmichael decided to leave the MFDP. Instead, he began exploring SNCC projects in Alabama in 1965. During the period of the Selma to Montgomery marches, James Forman recruited him to participate in a "second front" to stage protests at the Alabama State Capitol in March 1965. Carmichael became disillusioned with the growing struggles between SNCC and the Southern Christian Leadership Conference (SCLC), which opposed Forman's strategy. He thought SCLC was working with affiliated black churches to undercut it. He was also frustrated to be drawn again into nonviolent confrontations with police, which he no longer found empowering. After seeing protesters brutally beaten again, he collapsed from stress, and his colleagues urged him to leave the city.

Within a week, Carmichael returned to protesting, this time in Selma, to participate in the final march along Route 80 to the state capital. But on March 23, 1965, Carmichael and some in SNCC who were participating in the Selma to Montgomery march declined to complete the march, instead initiating a grassroots project in "Bloody Lowndes" County, along the march route, talking with local residents. This was a county known for white violence against blacks during this era, where SCLC and Martin Luther King Jr. had tried and failed to organize its black residents. From 1877 to 1950, Lowndes County had 14 documented lynchings of African Americans. Carmichael and the SNCC activists who accompanied him also struggled in Lowndes, as local residents were at first wary of their presence. But they later achieved greater success as a result of a partnership with local activist John Hulett and other local leaders.

=== Lowndes County Freedom Organization ===
In 1965, working as a SNCC activist in the black majority Lowndes County, Alabama, Carmichael helped increase the number of registered black voters from 70 to 2,600, being 300 more than the number of registered white voters. Black voters had essentially been disfranchised by Alabama's constitution, passed by white Democrats in 1901. After Congressional passage in August of the Voting Rights Act of 1965, the federal government was authorized to oversee and enforce their rights. There was still tremendous resistance from wary residents, but an important breakthrough occurred when, while he was handing out voter registration material at a local school, two policemen confronted Carmichael and ordered him to leave. He refused and avoided arrest after challenging the two officers to do so. As word of this incident spread, Carmichael and the SNCC activists who stayed with him in Lowndes gained more respect from local residents and started working with Hulett and other local leaders. With the objective of registering African American voters, Carmichael, Hulett and their local allies formed the Lowndes County Freedom Organization (LCFO), a party that had the black panther as its mascot, over the white-dominated local Democratic Party, whose mascot was a white rooster. Since federal protection from violent voter suppression by the Ku Klux Klan and other white opponents was sporadic, most Lowndes County activists openly carried arms.

Despite Carmichael's role in forming the LCFO, Hulett served as the group's chairperson and became one of the first two African Americans whose voter registration was successfully processed in Lowndes County. Although black residents and voters outnumbered whites in Lowndes, their candidate lost the countywide election of 1965. In 1966, several LCFO candidates ran for office in the general election but lost. In 1970, the LCFO merged with the statewide Democratic Party, and former LCFO candidates, including Hulett, won their first offices in the county.

=== Chairman of SNCC and Black Power ===
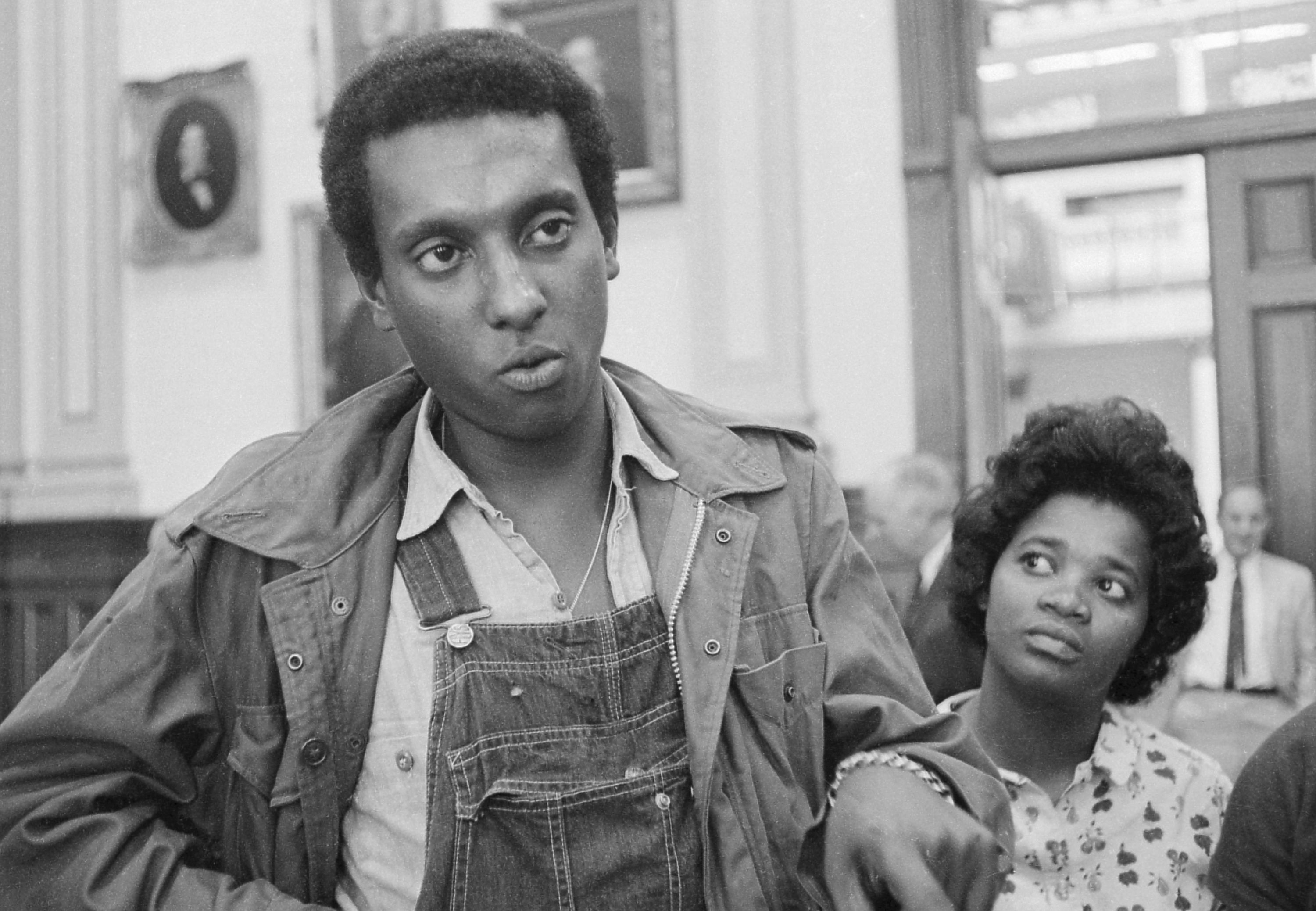
Carmichael at a 1966 press conference in Mississippi

In August 1963, the Student Nonviolent Coordinating Committee elected as its chairman John Lewis, one of the "Big Six" activists who organized the March on Washington. Carmichael said Lewis was "regular guy, uncomplicated, friendly, and brave", while Carmichael himself led a faction whose direction was toward a path "less regular" and "a lot less friendly".

In 1966, the SNCC convened in Kingston Springs, Tennessee, and reelected Lewis by a 60–22 vote. Activist Worth Long challenged the election on procedural grounds and, in the debate that followed, Lewis was repeatedly denounced and the meeting concluded with Carmichael elected as chairman. One of his first actions was to call upon all fellow black activists to continue writer and Air Force veteran James Meredith's solitary March Against Fear. Meredith had not wanted any well-known civil rights organizations or leaders involved in the action but would accept individual black men. On his second day out, Meredith was shot and wounded by a sniper and was hospitalized.

Carmichael joined King, Floyd McKissick, Cleveland Sellers and others to continue Meredith's march. He was arrested while marching through Greenwood, and, after his release, gave his first "Black Power" speech at a rally that night, using the term to urge black pride and socioeconomic independence:

It is a call for black people in this country to unite, to recognize their heritage, to build a sense of community. It is a call for black people to define their own goals, to lead their own organizations.

According to historian David J. Garrow, a few days after Carmichael spoke about Black Power at the rally during "Meredith March Against Fear", he told King: "Martin, I deliberately decided to raise this issue on the march in order to give it a national forum and force you to take a stand for Black Power." King responded, "I have been used before. One more time won't hurt."

While Black Power was not a new concept, Carmichael's speech brought it into the spotlight. It became a rallying cry for young African Americans across the country who were frustrated by slow progress in civil rights, even after federal legislation had been passed to strengthen the effort. Everywhere that Black Power spread, if accepted, Carmichael got credit. If it was condemned, he was held responsible and blamed. According to Carmichael, "Black Power meant black people coming together to form a political force and either electing representatives or forcing their representatives to speak to their needs [rather than relying on established parties]." Strongly influenced by the work of Frantz Fanon and his landmark book The Wretched of the Earth, along with others such as Malcolm X, Carmichael led SNCC to become more radical. The group focused on Black Power as its core goal and ideology.

During the controversial Atlanta Project in 1966, SNCC, under the local leadership of Bill Ware, engaged in a voter drive to promote the candidacy of Julian Bond from an Atlanta district for a seat in the Georgia State Legislature. Ware excluded Northern white SNCC members from working on this drive. Carmichael initially opposed this decision but changed his mind. At the urging of the Atlanta Project, the issue of white members in SNCC came up for a vote. Carmichael ultimately sided with those calling for the expulsion of whites. He said that whites should organize poor white southern communities, of which there were plenty, while SNCC focused on promoting African American self-reliance through Black Power.

Carmichael considered nonviolence a tactic, not a fundamental principle, which separated him from civil rights leaders such as King. He criticized civil rights leaders who called for the integration of African Americans into existing institutions of the middle-class mainstream.

Now, several people have been upset because we've said that integration was irrelevant when initiated by blacks, and that in fact it was a subterfuge, an insidious subterfuge, for the maintenance of white supremacy. Now we maintain that in the past six years or so, this country has been feeding us a "thalidomide drug of integration", and that some Negroes have been walking down a dream street talking about sitting next to white people; and that that does not begin to solve the problem; that when we went to Mississippi we did not go to sit next to Ross Barnett; we did not go to sit next to Jim Clark; we went to get them out of our way; and that people ought to understand that; that we were never fighting for the right to integrate, we were fighting against white supremacy. Now, then, in order to understand white supremacy we must dismiss the fallacious notion that white people can give anybody their freedom. No man can give anybody his freedom. A man is born free. You may enslave a man after he is born free, and that is in fact what this country does. It enslaves black people after they're born, so that the only acts that white people can do is to stop denying black people their freedom; that is, they must stop denying freedom. They never give it to anyone.

Carmichael wrote that "in order for nonviolence to work, your opponent must have a conscience. The United States has none."

During Carmichael's leadership, SNCC continued to maintain a coalition with several white radical organizations, most notably Students for a Democratic Society (SDS). It encouraged the SDS to focus on militant anti-draft resistance. At an SDS-organized conference at UC Berkeley in October 1966, Carmichael challenged the white left to escalate their resistance to the military draft in a manner similar to the black movement. For a time in 1967, he considered an alliance with Saul Alinsky's Industrial Areas Foundation, and generally supported IAF's work in Rochester's and Buffalo's black communities.

=== Vietnam ===
SNCC conducted its first actions against the military draft and the Vietnam War under Carmichael's leadership. He popularized the oft-repeated anti-draft slogan "Hell no, we won't go!" during this time.

Carmichael encouraged King to demand unconditional withdrawal of US troops from Vietnam, even as some King advisers cautioned him that such opposition might have an adverse effect on financial contributions to the SCLC. King preached one of his earliest speeches calling for unconditional withdrawal with Carmichael in the front row at his invitation. Carmichael privately took credit for pushing King toward anti-imperialism, and historians such as Peniel Joseph and Michael Eric Dyson agree.

Carmichael joined King in New York on April 15, 1967, to share his views with protesters on race related to the Vietnam War:

The draft exemplifies as much as racism the totalitarianism which prevails in this nation in the disguise of consensus democracy. The President has conducted war in Vietnam without the consent of Congress or the American people, without the consent of anybody except maybe Lady Bird.

== 1967–1968: Transition out of SNCC ==
=== Stepping down as chair ===
In May 1967, Carmichael stepped down as chairman of SNCC and was replaced by H. Rap Brown. SNCC was a collective, working by group consensus rather than hierarchically; many members had become displeased with Carmichael's celebrity status. SNCC leaders had begun to refer to him as "Stokely Starmichael" and criticized his habit of making policy announcements independently, before achieving internal agreement. According to historian Clayborne Carson, Carmichael did not protest the transfer of power and was "eager to relinquish the chair". It is sometimes mistakenly reported that Carmichael left SNCC completely at this time and joined the Black Panther Party, but that did not occur until 1968. SNCC officially ended its relationship with Carmichael in August 1968; in a statement, Philip Hutchings wrote: "It has been apparent for some time that SNCC and Stokely Carmichael were moving in different directions."

=== Targeted by FBI COINTELPRO ===
During this period, Carmichael was targeted by a section of J. Edgar Hoover's COINTELPRO (counter-intelligence program) that focused on black activists; the program promoted slander and violence against targets Hoover considered enemies of the US government. It attempted to discredit them and worse. Carmichael accepted the position of Honorary Prime Minister in the Black Panther Party, but also remained on the SNCC staff. He tried to forge a merger between the two organizations. A March 4, 1968, memo from Hoover states his fear of the rise of a Black Nationalist "messiah" and that Carmichael alone had the "necessary charisma to be a real threat in this way". In July 1968, Hoover stepped up his efforts to divide the black power movement. Declassified documents show he launched a plan to undermine the SNCC-Panther merger, as well as to "bad-jacket" Carmichael as a Central Intelligence Agency (CIA) agent. Both efforts were largely successful: Carmichael was expelled from SNCC that year, and the Panthers began to denounce him, putting him at grave personal risk.

=== International activism ===
After stepping down as SNCC chair, Carmichael wrote the book Black Power: The Politics of Liberation (1967) with Charles V. Hamilton. It is a first-person reflection on his experiences in SNCC and his dissatisfaction with the direction of the Civil Rights Movement in the late 1960s. Throughout the work he directly and indirectly criticizes the established leadership of the SCLC and NAACP for their tactics and results, often claiming that they were accepting symbols instead of change.

He promoted what he calls "political modernization." This idea included three major concepts: "1) questioning old values and institutions of the society; 2) searching for new and different forms of political structure to solve political and economic problems; and, 3) broadening the base of political participation to include more people in the decision-making process." By questioning "old values and institutions", Carmichael was referring not only to the established Black leadership of the time but also to the values and institutions of the nation as a whole. He criticized the emphasis on the American "middle-class." "The values," he said, "of that class are based on material aggrandizement, not the expansion of humanity." (40) Carmichael believed that blacks were being lured to enter the "middle-class" as a trap, in which they would be assimilated into the white world by turning their backs on others of their race who were still suffering. This assimilation, he thought, was an inherent indictment of blackness and validation of whiteness as the preferred state. He said, "Thus we reject the goal of assimilation into middle-class America because the values of that class are in themselves anti-humanist and because that class as a social force perpetuates racism."

Secondly, Carmichael discussed searching for different forms of political structure to solve political and economic problems. At the time, the established forms of political structure were the SCLC and the NAACP. These groups were religiously and academically based and focused on nonviolence and steady legal and legislative change within established U.S. systems and structures. Carmichael rejected that. He discusses the development of the Mississippi Freedom Democrats, the 1966 local election in Lowndes County, and the political history of Tuskegee, Alabama. He chose these examples as places where blacks changed the system by political and legal maneuvering within the system, but said they ultimately failed to achieve more than the bare minimum. In the process, he believed they reinforced the political and legal structures that perpetuated the racism they were fighting.

In response to these failures and to offer a way forward, Carmichael discusses the concept of coalition with regard to the Civil Rights Movement. The leadership of the movement had affirmed that anyone who truly believed in their cause was welcome to join and march. Carmichael offered a different vision. Influenced by Fanon's ideas in The Wretched of the Earth, wherein two groups were not "complementary" (could have no overlap) until they were mutually exclusive (were on an equal power footing economically, socially, politically, etc.), Carmichael said that U.S. blacks had to unite and build their power independent of the white structure, or they would never be able to build a coalition that would function for both parties, not just the dominant one. He said, "we want to establish the grounds on which we feel political coalitions can be viable." For this to happen, Carmichael argued that blacks had to address three myths regarding coalition: "that the interests of black people are identical with the interests of certain liberal, labor, or other reform groups"; that a viable coalition can be created between "the politically and economically secure and the politically and economically insecure"; and that a coalition can be "sustained on a moral, friendly, sentimental basis; by appeals to conscience." He believed that each of these myths showed the need for two groups to be mutually exclusive, and on relatively equal footing, to be in a viable coalition.

This philosophy, grounded in the independence literature of Africa and Latin America, became the basis for a great deal of Carmichael's work. He believed the Black Power Movement had to be developed outside the white power structure.

Carmichael also continued as a strong critic of the Vietnam War and imperialism in general. During this period, he traveled and lectured extensively throughout the world, visiting Guinea, North Vietnam, China, and Cuba. He became more clearly identified with the Black Panther Party as its "Honorary Prime Minister." During this period, he acted more as a speaker than an organizer, traveling throughout the country and internationally advocating for his vision of Black Power.

Carmichael lamented the 1967 execution of Marxist revolutionary Che Guevara, saying:

The death of Che Guevara places a responsibility on all revolutionaries of the World to redouble their decision to fight on to the final defeat of Imperialism. That is why in essence Che Guevara is not dead, his ideas are with us.

Carmichael visited the United Kingdom in July 1967 to attend the Dialectics of Liberation conference. After recordings of his speeches were released by the organizers, the Institute of Phenomenological Studies, he was banned from reentering the United Kingdom. In August 1967, a Cuban government magazine reported that Carmichael met with Fidel Castro for three days and called it "the most educational, most interesting, and the best apprenticeship of [my] public life." Because relations with Cuba were prohibited at the time, after his return to the US, the government withdrew his passport. In December 1967, he traveled to France to attend an antiwar rally. There he was detained by police and ordered to leave the next day, but government officials eventually intervened and allowed him to stay.

=== 1968 D.C. riots ===
Carmichael was present in Washington, D.C., on April 5, 1968, the night after the assassination of Martin Luther King Jr. He led a group through the streets, demanding that businesses close out of respect. He tried to prevent violence, but the situation escalated beyond his control. Due to his reputation as a provocateur, the news media blamed Carmichael for the ensuing violence as mobs rioted along U Street and other areas of black commercial development.

Carmichael held a press conference the next day at which he predicted mass racial violence in the streets. Since moving to Washington, he had been under nearly constant FBI surveillance. After the riots, FBI director J. Edgar Hoover instructed a team of agents to find evidence connecting Carmichael to them. He was also subjected to COINTELPRO's bad-jacketing technique. Huey P. Newton suggested Carmichael was a CIA agent, slander that led to Carmichael's break with the Panthers and his exile from the U.S. the following year.

== 1969–1998: Travel to Africa ==
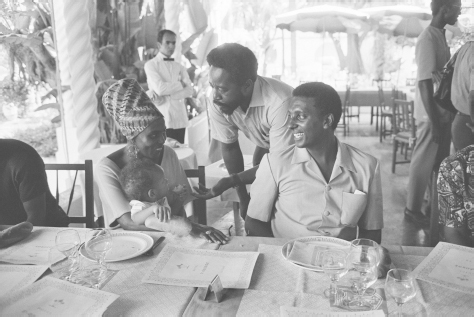
Stokely Carmichael (right) and Miriam Makeba (left) in Algiers, 1969

In 1968, he married Miriam Makeba, a noted singer from South Africa. They left the US for Guinea the next year. Carmichael became an aide to Guinean president Ahmed Sékou Touré, and a student of the exiled Ghanaian president Kwame Nkrumah. Makeba was appointed Guinea's delegate to the United Nations.

=== Break with the Black Panthers ===
Three months after his arrival in Guinea, in July 1969 Carmichael published a formal rejection of the Black Panthers, condemning them for not being separatist enough and for their "dogmatic party line favoring alliances with white radicals". The Panthers believed that white activists could help the movement, while Carmichael had come to agree with Malcolm X that white activists should organize their own communities before trying to lead black people.

=== Life in Guinea ===
Carmichael remained in Guinea after his separation from the Black Panther Party. He continued to travel, write, and speak in support of international leftist movements. In 1971, he published his collected essays in a second volume, Stokely Speaks: Black Power Back to Pan-Africanism. This book expounds an explicitly socialist Pan-African vision, which he retained for the rest of his life.

Carmichael changed his name to Kwame Ture in 1978 to honor Nkrumah and Touré, who had become his patrons. At the end of his life, friends called him by both names, which "he doesn't seem to mind", according to Washington Post reporter Paula Span.

In 1986, two years after Sékou Touré's death, the military regime that took his place arrested Carmichael for his association with Touré, and jailed him for three days on suspicion of attempting to overthrow the government. Although Touré was known for jailing and torturing his opponents (some 50,000 people are believed to have been killed under his regime) Carmichael had never publicly criticized the man he named himself after. From the late 1970s till his death, he answered his phone by announcing: "Ready for the revolution!"

=== U.S. and British government attention ===
Carmichael's suspicions about CIA surveillance were confirmed in 2007 by declassified documents revealing that the agency had tracked him from 1968 as part of their surveillance of Black activists abroad. The surveillance continued for years.

Documents declassified in 2022 revealed that the Information Research Department (IRD) of the British Foreign Office, concerned by Carmichael's socialist and pan-Africanist views, created a fake organization which published literature critical of Carmichael. The IRD created "The Black Power – Africa's Heritage Group", supposedly based in West Africa, and via the organization disseminated a pamphlet portraying Carmichael "as a foreign interloper in Africa who was contemptuous of the inhabitants of the continent". The pamphlet, which said, "Enough is enough – why Stokely must go! – and do his thing elsewhere", alleged that Carmichael was controlled by Nkrumah and was "weaving a bloody trail of chaos in the name of Pan-Africanism".

=== All-African People's Revolutionary Party ===
External videos
- "Life and Career of Kwame Ture", C-SPAN

For the final 30 years of his life, Kwame Ture was devoted to the All-African People's Revolutionary Party (A-APRP). His mentor Nkrumah had many ideas for unifying the African continent, and Ture extended the scope of these ideas to the entire African diaspora. He was a Central Committee member during his association with the A-APRP and made many speeches on the party's behalf.

Ture did not simply study with Touré and Nkrumah. The latter had been designated honorary co-president of Guinea after he was deposed by the US-backed coup in Ghana. Ture worked overtly and covertly to "Take Nkrumah Back to Ghana" (according to the movement's slogan). He became a member of the Democratic Party of Guinea (PDG), the revolutionary ruling party. He sought Nkrumah's permission to launch the All-African People's Revolutionary Party (A-APRP), which Nkrumah had called for in his book Handbook of Revolutionary Warfare. After several discussions, Nkrumah gave his blessing.

Ture was convinced that the A-APRP was needed as a permanent mass-based organization in all countries where people of African descent lived. For the last decades of his life, a period often ignored by popular media, Ture worked full-time as an organizer of the party. He spoke on its behalf on several continents, at college campuses, community centers, and other venues. He was instrumental in strengthening ties between the African/Black liberation movement and several revolutionary or progressive organizations, both African and non-African. Notable among them were the American Indian Movement (AIM) of the United States, New Jewel Movement (Grenada), National Joint Action Committee (NJAC) of Trinidad and Tobago, Palestine Liberation Organization (PLO), the Pan Africanist Congress (South Africa) and the Irish Republican Socialist Party.

Routinely, Ture was regarded as the leader of the A-APRP, but his only titles were "Organizer" and Central Committee member. Beginning in the mid-1970s, the A-APRP began each May to sponsor African Liberation Day (ALD), a continuation of the African Freedom Day Nkrumah began in 1958 in Ghana. Although the party was involved in or was primary or co-sponsor of other ALD annual observances, marches, and rallies around the world, the best-known and largest event was held annually in Washington, D.C., usually at Meridian Hill Park (also known as Malcolm X Park) at 16th and W Streets, NW.

==== Lecturing in the Caribbean and the United States ====
While making his home in Guinea, Ture traveled frequently. In the last quarter of the 20th century, he became the world's most active and prominent exponent of pan-Africanism, defined by Nkrumah and the A-APRP as "The Liberation and Unification of Africa Under Scientific Socialism".

Ture often returned to speak to audiences of thousands (including students and townspeople) at his alma mater, Howard University, and other campuses. The Party worked to recruit students and other youth, and Ture hoped to attract them with his speeches. He also worked to raise the political consciousness of African/Black people in general. He formed the A-APRP with the initial goal of putting "Africa" on the lips of Black people throughout the diaspora, knowing that many did not consciously or positively relate to their ancestral homeland. Ture was convinced that the party significantly raised international black "consciousness" of Pan-Africanism. The government of Trinidad and Tobago barred him from lecturing in the country for fear that he would cause disturbances among black Trinidadians.

Under his leadership, the A-APRP organized the All African Women's Revolutionary Union and the Sammy Younge Jr. Brigade (named after the first black college student to die during the 1960s Civil Rights Movement) as component organizations.

Ture and Cuban president Fidel Castro admired each other, sharing a common opposition to imperialism. In Ture's final letter, he wrote:

It was Fidel Castro who before the OLAS (Organization of Latin American States) Conference said "if imperialism touches one grain of hair on his head, we shall not let the fact pass without retaliation." It was he, who on his own behalf, asked them all to stay in contact with me when I returned to the United States to offer me protection.

Ture was ill when he gave his final speech at Howard University in 1998. A standing-room-only crowd in Rankin Chapel paid tribute to him, and he spoke boldly, as usual. A small group of student leaders from Howard and a former Party member traveled to Harlem (Sugar Hill) in New York City to bid Ture farewell shortly before his final return to Guinea. Also present that evening were Kathleen Cleaver and another Black Panther, Dhoruba bin Wahad (Richard Earl Moore). Ture was in good spirits though in pain. The group included men and women born in Africa, South America, the Caribbean, as well as the USA.

== Illness and death ==
In 1996, Ture was diagnosed with prostate cancer. He was treated for a period in Cuba and received some support from the Nation of Islam. Benefit concerts for Ture were held in Denver, New York, Atlanta, and Washington, D.C., to help defray his medical expenses. The government of Trinidad and Tobago, where he was born, awarded him a grant of $1,000 a month for the same purpose. He went to New York, where he was treated for two years at the Columbia-Presbyterian Medical Center, before returning to Guinea.

In a final interview given in April 1998 to The Washington Post, Ture criticized the limited economic and electoral progress made by African Americans in the U.S. during the previous 30 years. He acknowledged that Black people had won election to the mayor's office in major cities, but said that, as the mayors' power had generally diminished over earlier decades, such progress was essentially meaningless.

External videos
- "Memorial Service for Kwame Ture", C-SPAN

In November 1998, Ture died of prostate cancer at the age of 57 in Conakry, Guinea. He had said that his cancer "was given to me by forces of American imperialism and others who conspired with them." He claimed that the FBI had infected him with cancer in an assassination attempt.

The civil rights leader Jesse Jackson spoke in celebration of Ture's life, saying: "He was one of our generation who was determined to give his life to transforming America and Africa. He was committed to ending racial apartheid in our country. He helped to bring those walls down". NAACP Chair Julian Bond said that Carmichael "ought to be remembered for having spent almost every moment of his adult life trying to advance the cause of black liberation."

== Personal life ==
Ture married singer Miriam Makeba from South Africa in the U.S. in 1968. They divorced in Guinea after separating in 1973.

Later he married Marlyatou Barry, a Guinean doctor. They divorced sometime after having a son in 1981. By 1998, Marlyatou Barry and Bokar were living in Arlington County, Virginia, US. Using a statement from the All-African People's Revolutionary Party as a reference, Ture's 1998 obituary in The New York Times said he was survived by two sons, three sisters and his mother.

== Legacy ==
Ture, along with Charles V. Hamilton, is credited developing the concept of "institutional racism", defined as racism that occurs through institutions such as public bodies and corporations, including universities. In the late 1960s Ture defined "institutional racism" as "the collective failure of an organization to provide an appropriate and professional service to people because of their color, culture or ethnic origin".

In his book on King, David J. Garrow criticizes Ture's handling of the Black Power movement as "more destructive than constructive". Garrow describes the period in 1966 when Ture and other SNCC members managed to register 2,600 African American voters in Lowndes County as the most consequential period in Ture's life "in terms of real, positive, tangible influence on people's lives". Evaluations by Ture's associates are also mixed, with most praising his efforts and others criticizing him for failing to find constructive ways to achieve his objectives. SNCC's final chair, Phil Hutchings, who expelled Ture over a dispute about the Black Panther Party, wrote: "Even though we kidded and called him 'Starmichael', he could sublimate his ego to get done what was needed to be done....He would say what he thought, and you could disagree with it but you wouldn't cease being a human being and someone with whom he wanted to be in relationship." Washington Post staff writer Paula Span described Carmichael as someone who was rarely hesitant to push his own ideology. Tufts University historian Peniel Joseph's biography, Stokely: A Life, says that Black Power activist Ruby Doris Smith Robinson, the first to call him as "Stokely Starmichael," gave him the nickname in protest of his growing ego and that other SNCC staff shared her view.

Joseph credits Ture with expanding the parameters of the civil rights movement, asserting that his black power strategy "didn't disrupt the civil rights movement. It spoke truth to power to what so many millions of young people were feeling. It actually cast a light on people who were in prisons, people who were welfare rights activists, tenants' rights activists, and also in the international arena." Tavis Smiley calls Ture "one of the most underappreciated, misunderstood, undervalued personalities this country's ever produced".

In 2002, the American-born scholar Molefi Kete Asante listed Ture as one of his 100 Greatest African Americans.

Ture is also remembered for his actions in James Meredith's March Against Fear in June 1966, when he issued the call for Black Power. When Meredith was shot, Carmichael came up with the phrase and gathered a crowd to chant it in Greenwood, Mississippi. Already, earlier that day, he had been arrested for the 27th time; he spoke to more than 3,000 people that day in the park. Ture was angry that day because black people had been "chanting" freedom for almost six years with no results, so he wanted to change the chant. He also participated in and contributed to the Black Freedom Struggle. Many people have overlooked his involvement in the movement.

== Controversies ==
=== Anti-Zionism ===
According to Abraham H. Foxman, National Director of the pro-Israel advocacy organization Anti-Defamation League, Carmichael was "an unabashed racial separatist and anti-Semite" who often used the slogan "the only good Zionist is a dead Zionist" and in 1990 said that "Zionist pigs have been harassing us everywhere. ... And when this anger rises, [we] will snap our fingers and finish them off."

Carmichael wrote in his posthumously published memoirs that he was anti-Zionist and pro-Palestinian. He wrote that Israel was a colonial power and that its treatment of Palestinians was a form of apartheid.

=== Views on women ===
In November 1964 Carmichael made a joking remark in response to a SNCC position paper written by his friends Casey Hayden and Mary E. King on the position of women in the movement. In the course of an irreverent comedy monologue he performed at a party after SNCC's Waveland conference, Carmichael said, "The position of women in the movement is prone." A number of women were offended. In a 2006 The Chronicle of Higher Education article, historian Peniel E. Joseph later wrote:

While the remark was made in jest during a 1964 conference, Carmichael and black-power activists did embrace an aggressive vision of manhood—one centered on black men's ability to deploy authority, punishment, and power. In that, they generally reflected their wider society's blinders about women and politics.

Carmichael's colleague John Lewis wrote in his autobiography, March, that the comment was a joke, uttered as Carmichael and other SNCC officials were "blowing off steam" following the adjournment of a meeting at a staff retreat in Waveland, Mississippi. When asked about the comment, former SNCC field secretary Casey Hayden said: "Our paper on the position of women came up, and Stokely in his hipster rap comedic way joked that 'the proper position of women in SNCC is prone'. I laughed, he laughed, we all laughed. Stokely was a friend of mine." In her memoir, Mary E. King wrote that Carmichael was "poking fun at his own attitudes" and that "Casey and I felt, and continue to feel, that Stokely was one of the most responsive men at the time that our anonymous paper appeared in 1964."

Carmichael appointed several women to posts as project directors during his tenure as chairman of SNCC; by the latter half of the 1960s (considered to be the "Black Power era"), more women were in charge of SNCC projects than during the first half.

== In popular culture ==
=== Film ===
- In Spike Lee's 2018 film BlacKkKlansman, Kwame Ture is portrayed by Corey Hawkins.
- In the 1995 film Panther based on Melvin Van Peebles's screenplay, Stokely Carmichael is portrayed by director Mario Van Peebles.

=== Exhibition ===
- In 2018 a national tribute 'the fight of a lifetime' is dedicated to him during a one-month exhibition at the Gamal Abdel Nasser University of Conakry.

=== Music ===
- Carmichael's speeches have been sampled by composer and DJ Hideki Naganuma.

=== Stage ===
- Nambi E. Kelley's play Stokely: The Unfinished Revolution premiered at the Court Theatre in Chicago in May 2024. Anthony Irons portrayed Carmichael.

== Works ==
- Stokely Speaks: From Black Power to Pan-Africanism (1965), ISBN 978-1-55652-649-7
- Black Power: The Politics of Liberation (1967), ISBN 0-679-74313-8
- Black Power (1968), Liberation Records DL-6
- Free Huey! (1970), Black Forum/Motown Records BF-452 (reissued in 2022 as Black Forum/Motown/UMe/Universal 456 139)
- Ready for Revolution: The Life and Struggles of Stokely Carmichael (Kwame Ture) (2005), ISBN 978-0-684-85004-7

== See also ==
- List of civil rights leaders
