= Lowndes County School District =

Lowndes County School District or Lowndes County Public Schools may refer to:

- Lowndes County School District (Alabama)
- Lowndes County School District (Georgia)
- Lowndes County School District (Mississippi)
