= Green Door Distilling =

American distillery

- Industry: Distilling
- Founded: 2014
- Founder: Josh Cook
- Headquarters: Kalamazoo, Michigan
- Owners: Steve Jbara; Scott Benton; Ben Wallace

Green Door Distilling is an American distillery.

== History ==
Green Door Distilling was founded in 2014 by Josh Cook in Kalamazoo, Michigan. The company opened its tasting room and retail shop in 2016 under head distiller and president Jon Good. It is now owned by Steve Jbara, Scott Benton, and former NBA player Ben Wallace, who acquired a minority ownership stake in 2022. In 2020, Tyler Glasser assumed the role of head distiller at Green Door, and in 2021, both he and Green Door appeared on the Discovery Channel television series, Master Distiller. In 2022 Scott Gardner replaced Glasser as head distiller at Green Door.

== Liquors ==
The distillery creates gin, vodka, whisky, amaro, bourbon, and flavored liqueurs. Its line has received the Michigan vodka distillery of the year award from the New York International Spirits competition, with its vodka receiving the silver medal from the American Distilling Institute. The lines have also received medals from the San Francisco World Spirits Competition, a double gold for its blueberry liqueur in 2021, and gold medals for gin and bourbon as well as silver medals for vodka and blueberry liqueur in 2022.

The company uses Michigan oak to produce its barrels. In early 2020, the distillery transitioned to making hand sanitizer to help bolster the national supply during the COVID-19 pandemic, which it donated to various health centers and agencies.
