= All-African People's Revolutionary Party =

- Abbreviation: A-APRP
- Founder: Kwame Nkrumah; Kwame Ture; Amilcar Cabral; Franz Tagoe
- Founded: 1968; 58 years ago
- Youth wing: Young Pioneers Institute
- Women's wing: All-African Women's Revolutionary Union
- Ideology: Nkrumahism-Touréism-Cabralism; Fanonism; Communism; Scientific socialism African socialism Pan-Africanism; Black nationalism Anti-colonialism; Anti-Zionism
- Political position: Left-wing to far-left

Website
- aaprp-intl.org

The All-African People's Revolutionary Party (A-APRP) is a socialist political party founded by Kwame Nkrumah and organized in Conakry, Guinea in 1968. The party expanded to the United States in 1972 and claims to have recruited members from 33 countries. According to the party, global membership in the party is "in the hundreds".

Nkrumah's goal in founding the party was to create and manage the political economic conditions necessary for the emergence of an All-African People's Revolutionary Army that would lead the military struggle against "settler colonialism, Zionism, neo-colonialism, imperialism and all other forms of capitalist oppression and exploitation."

== Concept and philosophy ==
As described by Dave Blevins and other scholars like Carole Boyce Davies, "the ideology of the A-APRP is Nkrumahism—Toureism, which takes its name from the founder, and his primary colleague in arms, President Ahmed Sekou Toure." Since then, the party has changed its official ideology to Nkrumahism-Touréism-Cabralism.

Kwame Nkrumah, the founder, introduced the party's concept and philosophy in his book, Handbook of Revolutionary Warfare - released in 1968 by Panaf Books, ISBN 9780317280678

Some of the key concepts include:

1. promotion of African unity
2. embracing the need and characteristics of African civilization and ideology
3. working for economical and technological advancement

The party supports:

1. Pan-Africanism — "a total liberation and unification of Africa under Scientific Socialism"
2. Black Power — "the belief that real black freedom will only come when Africa is politically united"
3. Scientific Socialism — "the idea that modern technology can be reconciled with human values, in which an advanced technological society is realized without the social upheaval and deep schisms that occur in capitalist industrial societies"

In an attempt to articulate effectively the issues facing African people and the African woman, the A-APRP also infused gender politics into its ideology and organisational structure. This resulted in the formation of the All-African Women's Revolutionary Union in 1980. This women's wing of the party emerged specifically to address issues surrounding gender oppression with racism and classism.

== Chapters ==
The building of the A-APRP began to take form in 1968 with the creation of "the first A-APRP Work-Study Circle in Guinea under the leadership of Kwame -Ture", and later in the United States, Canada, the Caribbean, England, France, and numerous countries in Africa. Since 1968, the A-APRP "has recruited Africans born in more than 33 countries."

== Bibliography ==
- Asante, Molefi Kete; Mazama, Ama; Cérol, Marie-José; Encyclopedia of Black Studies, SAGE (2005), pp. 77–8, ISBN 9780761927624 (Retrieved 19 July 2019)
- Blevins, Dave, American Political Parties in the 21st Century. McFarland (2006), pp. 8–9, ISBN 9780786424801 (Retrieved 19 July 2019)
- Boyce Davies, Carole, Encyclopedia of the African Diaspora: Origins, Experiences, and Culture, Volume 2, ABC-CLIO (2008), pp. 78–9, ISBN 9781851097005 (Retrieved 19 July 2019)
- Gates, Henry Louis Gates Jr., African American Lives (editors: Henry Louis Gates, W. E. B. DuBois Professor of Humanities Chair of Afro-American Studies and Director of the W. E. B. DuBois Institute for Afro-American Research Henry Louis Gates Jr, Evelyn Brooks Higginbotham, Victor S Thomas Professor of History and of African and African American Studies Evelyn Brooks Higginbotham; contributors: W. E. B. Du Bois Institute for Afro-American Research, American Council of Learned Societies), Oxford University Press, USA (2004), p. 142 ISBN 9780195160246, (Retrieved 21 July 2019)
- Springer, Kimberly, Still Lifting, Still Climbing: African American Women's Contemporary Activism, NYU Press (1999), p. 174, ISBN 9780814708606 (Retrieved 19 July 2019)
