= Lowndes County Public Schools (Alabama) =

School district in Alabama, United States

Lowndes County Public Schools (LCPS) is a school district serving Lowndes County, Alabama, headquartered in Hayneville.

== Schools ==
Secondary:

- Central High School (Lowndes County, Alabama)
- Hayneville Middle School
- Lowndes Middle School
- The Calhoun School

Elementary:

- Central Elementary School
- Fort Deposit Elementary School
- Jackson Steele Elementary School

Other

- Lowndes County Head Start

== History ==
Calhoun Colored School was a private boarding and day school in Calhoun, Alabama, from 1892 until 1945.

In 1906, there was a Hayneville Graded School. In 1908, there was a Hayneville High School. Lois Janette Rogers was valedictorian there.

The Calhoun School, sometimes referred to as Calhoun High School, is at 8213 County Road 33 in Letohatchee, Alabama. The vast majority of students are African American and from low-income families. The school serves about 200 students. Tigers are the school mascot, and blue and white are the school colors. The school is in a rural area.
