= Ben Wallace (basketball) =

American basketball player (born 1974)

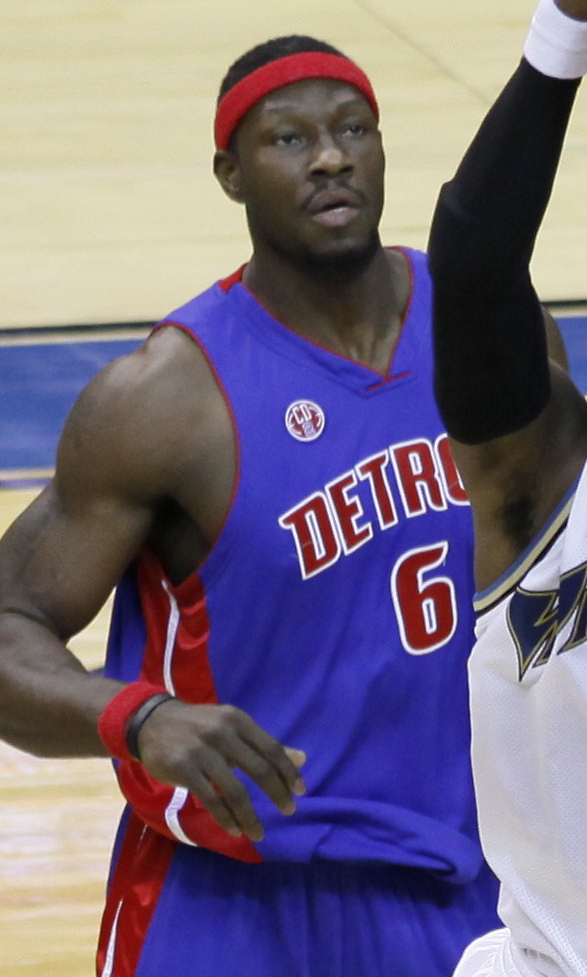
- Wallace with the Detroit Pistons in 2009

Detroit Pistons
- Title: Basketball operations and team engagement advisor
- League: NBA

Personal information
- Born: September 10, 1974 (age 52) White Hall, Alabama, U.S.
- Listed height: 6 ft 9 in (2.06 m)
- Listed weight: 240 lb (109 kg)

Career information
- High school: Central (Hayneville, Alabama)
- College: Cuyahoga CC (1992–1994); Virginia Union (1994–1996)
- NBA draft: 1996: undrafted
- Playing career: 1996–2012
- Position: Center
- Number: 30, 4, 3, 6

Career history
- 1996: Viola Reggio Calabria
- 1996–1999: Washington Bullets / Wizards
- 1999–2000: Orlando Magic
- 2000–2006: Detroit Pistons
- 2006–2008: Chicago Bulls
- 2008–2009: Cleveland Cavaliers
- 2009–2012: Detroit Pistons

Career highlights
- NBA champion (2004); 4× NBA All-Star (2003–2006); 3× All-NBA Second Team (2003, 2004, 2006); 2× All-NBA Third Team (2002, 2005); 4× NBA Defensive Player of the Year (2002, 2003, 2005, 2006); 5× NBA All-Defensive First Team (2002–2006); NBA All-Defensive Second Team (2007); 2× NBA rebounding leader (2002, 2003); NBA blocks leader (2002); No. 3 retired by Detroit Pistons; First-team Division II All-American – NABC (1996)

Career statistics
- Points: 6,254 (5.7 ppg)
- Rebounds: 10,482 (9.6 rpg)
- Blocks: 2,137 (2.0 bpg)
- Stats at NBA.com
- Stats at Basketball Reference
- Basketball Hall of Fame

Benjamin Camey Wallace (born September 10, 1974) is an American basketball executive and former professional player who played most of his career in the National Basketball Association (NBA) with the Detroit Pistons. Nicknamed "Big Ben", he is often considered the greatest undrafted player in NBA history. He is also widely regarded as one of the best defensive players of all time, excelling in rebounding, shot-blocking, and interior defense.

A native of Alabama, Wallace attended Cuyahoga Community College and Virginia Union University. In an NBA career that spanned from 1996 to 2012, he played with the Washington Bullets/Wizards, Orlando Magic, Chicago Bulls, and Cleveland Cavaliers as well as the Pistons. Wallace won the NBA Defensive Player of the Year Award four times, a record he shares with Dikembe Mutombo and Rudy Gobert. In nine seasons with the Pistons (2000–2006; 2009–2012), Wallace made two NBA Finals appearances (2004 and 2005) and won a championship in 2004. The Pistons retired his jersey No. 3 in 2016. Wallace was inducted into the Naismith Memorial Basketball Hall of Fame in the class of 2021.

Wallace has served as a basketball operations and team engagement advisor for the Pistons since 2021.

== Early life ==
Ben Camey Wallace was born on September 10, 1974, in White Hall, Alabama, a small town in Lowndes County. He is the tenth of eleven children. He attended Central High School in Hayneville where he received all-state honors in basketball, baseball, and football (as a linebacker). Former NBA player Charles Oakley was Wallace's mentor, having discovered Wallace at a 1991 basketball camp, and later recommended Wallace to his previous college, Virginia Union.

== College career ==
Wallace first played college basketball on the junior college level at Cuyahoga Community College in Cleveland for two years. There, staples of Wallace's defensive prowess were shown as he averaged 17.0 rebounds and 6.9 blocks per game. He then transferred to Virginia Union, an NCAA Division II school, where he studied criminal justice. Wallace averaged 13.4 points per game and 10.0 rebounds per game as a member of the Virginia Union Panthers, whom he led to the Division II Final Four and a 28–3 record. As a senior, Wallace was named by the head coaches of Virginia Union's conference, the Central Intercollegiate Athletic Association, to the All-CIAA first team, and was also selected as a first-team Division II All-American by the National Association of Basketball Coaches.

== Professional career ==
=== Viola Reggio Calabria (1996) ===
After leaving Virginia Union and going undrafted, he travelled to Italy for a tryout with the Italian team Viola Reggio Calabria, where he played only one game in the 1996–97 Italian Basketball Cup against Faber Fabriano on August 29, 1996.

=== Washington Bullets / Wizards (1996–1999) ===
Wallace appeared in only 34 games for Washington in the 1996–97 season and did not play many minutes. The following year, he appeared in 67 games and started in 16, but did not average many points (3.1) or rebounds (4.8). He did manage to average 1.1 blocks throughout the season, however, and his defensive play solidified his identity, and his minutes increased significantly in the lockout-shortened 1998–99 season, as he started in 16 of 46 games and averaged 6.0 points, 8.3 rebounds and 2.0 blocks per game.

=== Orlando Magic (1999–2000) ===
On August 11, 1999, Wallace was traded to the Orlando Magic in a multiplayer deal for Isaac Austin. In the 1999–2000 season, he solidified his role as a starter, starting in all 81 games that he appeared in. He averaged 4.8 points, 8.2 rebounds and 1.6 blocks for the Magic as they won 41 games. However, the Magic failed to make the playoffs and following the season, the Magic traded Wallace, along with Chucky Atkins, to the Detroit Pistons as compensation in a sign-and-trade deal for superstar forward and free agent Grant Hill.

=== Detroit Pistons (2000–2006) ===
==== Rise to defensive dominance (2000–2003) ====
The trade for Hill was considered one-sided, but in the 2000–01 season, Wallace had his most productive season yet, averaging 6.4 points per game while placing second in rebounds with 13.2 per game and tenth in blocks per game with 2.3, but the Pistons could not make the playoffs. The 2001–02 season would be even better for Wallace, as he averaged his most points per game for a season yet at 7.6 points, while leading the league in rebounding with 13.0 per game and shot blocking with 3.5. His strong defensive play earned him the NBA Defensive Player of the Year Award, while also being named to the All-Defensive First Team and the All-NBA Third Team. The Pistons won 50 games and the Central Division, and would defeat the Toronto Raptors in the first round of the playoffs before falling to the Paul Pierce-led Boston Celtics in the conference semifinals. Wallace opened the playoffs with a 19-point, 20-rebound effort against Toronto, and he managed to grab 20 or more rebounds two more times in 10 total playoff games, his first experience in the playoffs.

The 2002–03 season would result in another Defensive Player of the Year Award for Wallace, as well as another selection to the All-Defensive team along with being named to the All-NBA Second Team, as he increased his rebounding to 15.4 per game. The Pistons won 50 games and the Central Division again, and defeated Orlando in a grueling seven-game first-round series that included coming back from a 3–1 deficit. Detroit would go on to defeat the Philadelphia 76ers in six games, but the Pistons were swept by the defending Eastern Conference champion New Jersey Nets in the Conference Finals. Wallace increased his rebounding to 16.3 per game in the playoffs, and reached 20 or more rebounds four times.

==== NBA champion and return to the NBA Finals (2003–2005) ====
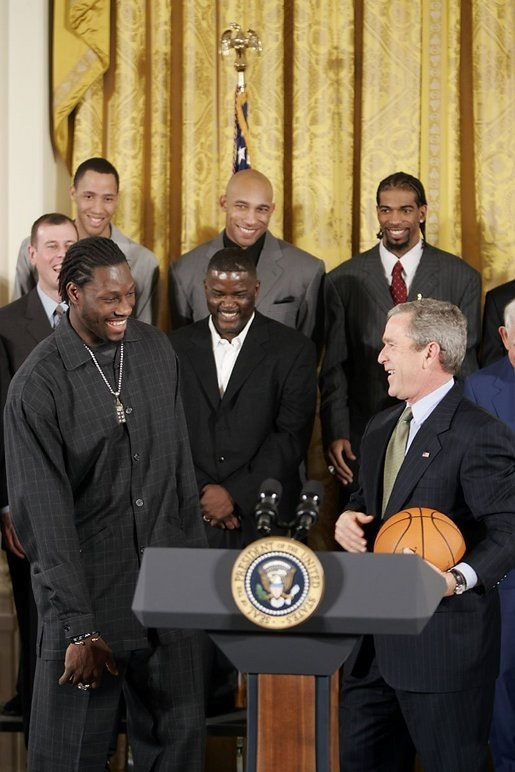
Wallace is honored with the Pistons at the White House by President Bush for the team's victory in the 2004 NBA Finals

The 2003–04 season saw Wallace continue to rank among the league leaders in rebounding (12.4 per game) and blocks (3.2 per game). Despite losing out on a third straight Defensive Player of the Year Award to Ron Artest, Wallace increased his scoring average to 9.5 points per game, and was named again to the All-Defensive First Team and the All-NBA Second Team. The season also featured new head coach Larry Brown, and he would lead the Pistons to 54 wins for the season, which included a late season acquisition of star power forward Rasheed Wallace to further improve the team's defense and scoring. In the playoffs, the Pistons handily defeated the Milwaukee Bucks in five games in the first round, before facing New Jersey for the second straight year. Despite taking a two-game lead to open the series, the Nets would put up a fight against the Pistons to win three straight games, and the Pistons responded with an 81–75 road win in New Jersey (in which Wallace grabbed 20 rebounds) before wrapping up the series with a 90–69 Game 7 win. The Pistons would then face the Jermaine O'Neal and Ron Artest-led, league-leading Indiana Pacers, and the two teams traded wins in the first four games. The Pistons won the next two games of the series, allowing them to advance to the Finals with Wallace scoring 12 points and grabbing 16 rebounds in the closing game of the series.

Detroit had not reached the Finals since 1990. The Pistons dominated in Game 1 with an 87–75 win in Los Angeles against the Los Angeles Lakers. The Lakers would respond in Game 2 with late-game heroics by team leaders Kobe Bryant and Shaquille O'Neal before the series moved to Detroit, but the combined defensive effort and near-perfect offensive execution at home brought the Pistons an 88–68 win in Game 3. The Lakers were unable to respond in Game 4, as the Pistons held their own and continued to dominate on defense and rebounding to beat the Lakers 88–80. Los Angeles needed one win to return the series to their home court, but the Pistons proved to be far too dominating again in Game 5, as Detroit won the game 100–87 to win the NBA championship led by Wallace who posted his best game of the series with 18 points and 22 rebounds. It would be the third NBA title for the franchise and its first since 1990. Wallace held his own against the likes of Indiana's Jermaine O'Neal and then Shaquille O'Neal in the Finals, posting averages of 10.3 points per game with 14.3 rebounds and 2.4 blocks. In the 2003–04 season and 2004 playoffs, Wallace posted individual Defensive Ratings of 87 and 84, respectively. Among players with a comparable number of games and minutes played, both of these marks are the lowest individual defensive ratings posted in a regular season or playoffs. The Pistons also began a tradition of sounding a deep chime whenever "Big Ben" scored or recorded a block on Detroit's home court, The Palace of Auburn Hills—an allusion to the original Big Ben in London.

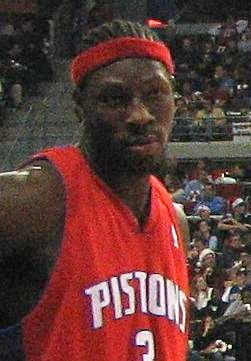
Wallace with the Pistons in 2005

The defending champions looked forward to defending their title in the 2004–05 season, but the season would take an unexpected turn near the end of a November 19 game against the Indiana Pacers, in which Wallace and Ron Artest sparred with each other before the infamous brawl named "The Malice at the Palace" involving both players and spectators took place. Wallace was suspended for six games, and his brother David Wallace received a year of probation and community service for punching Indiana's Fred Jones in the stands. Wallace continued to dominate on defense (2.4 blocks per game) and rebounding (12.2 per game), and increased his scoring production on his way to winning another Defensive Player of the Year Award along with yet another selection to the All-Defensive First Team and the All-NBA Third Team. In the playoffs, the Pistons dominated the Philadelphia 76ers before defeating their rival Pacers in the semifinals in six games. The Conference Finals would feature a matchup with the resurgent Miami Heat, who had acquired Shaquille O'Neal from the Lakers, and were led in scoring by Dwyane Wade. The teams traded victories before Miami won game 5 to take a 3–2 series lead, but the Pistons responded and took advantage of an injury to Wade in game 6 before grinding out a difficult 88–82 Game 7 win on the road in Miami to advance to their second straight Finals. Wallace once again held his own against O'Neal throughout the series.

This time in the Finals, Detroit would face the San Antonio Spurs, led by superstar Tim Duncan, and international players such as Tony Parker and Manu Ginóbili. The Spurs won the first two games at home before the Pistons matched them with two wins in Detroit, setting up a crucial Game 5 in which San Antonio managed a one-point victory. Detroit would respond with a win on the road in Game 6, but had no answer for Duncan and the Spurs' attack and lost the series in Game 7. Wallace averaged 10 points and 11.3 rebounds throughout the 2005 playoffs.

==== Final season in Detroit (2005–2006) ====
Despite the disappointing Finals' loss, the Pistons returned with a vengeance in the 2005–06 season, with Wallace winning another consecutive Defensive Player of the Year Award, a fifth straight selection to the All-Defensive First Team and another selection to the All-NBA Third Team. He was named an All-Star for the fourth straight season, and led the league in total offensive rebounds with 301. Detroit was dominant throughout the season, winning 64 games and earning the top seed in the conference. The playoffs featured a dominating win over Milwaukee in the first round followed by a grueling seven-game series win against the young Cleveland Cavaliers led by All-Star forward LeBron James. This set up a conference finals rematch with Miami, who had retooled their roster in the off-season. The Pistons struggled throughout the series with the impressive play of Dwyane Wade, who dominated offensively on the way to a 4–2 victory. Miami would go on to win that year's NBA title. Wallace's production fell significantly as compared to previous seasons in the playoffs, as he only averaged 4.7 points per game, 10.5 rebounds and just 1.2 blocks.

In each of the five straight seasons that the Pistons made the playoffs with Wallace, Detroit allowed the fewest points per game out of all 16 playoff teams. Without Wallace, the Pistons fell to third in points per game allowed in the 2007 and 2008 playoffs. At the conclusion of the 2005-06 season, Wallace became a free agent. He initially stated he was committed to returning to Detroit, but was disappointed with GM Joe Dumars' final-offer contract of four years, $48 million and decided to test free agency.

=== Chicago Bulls (2006–2008) ===
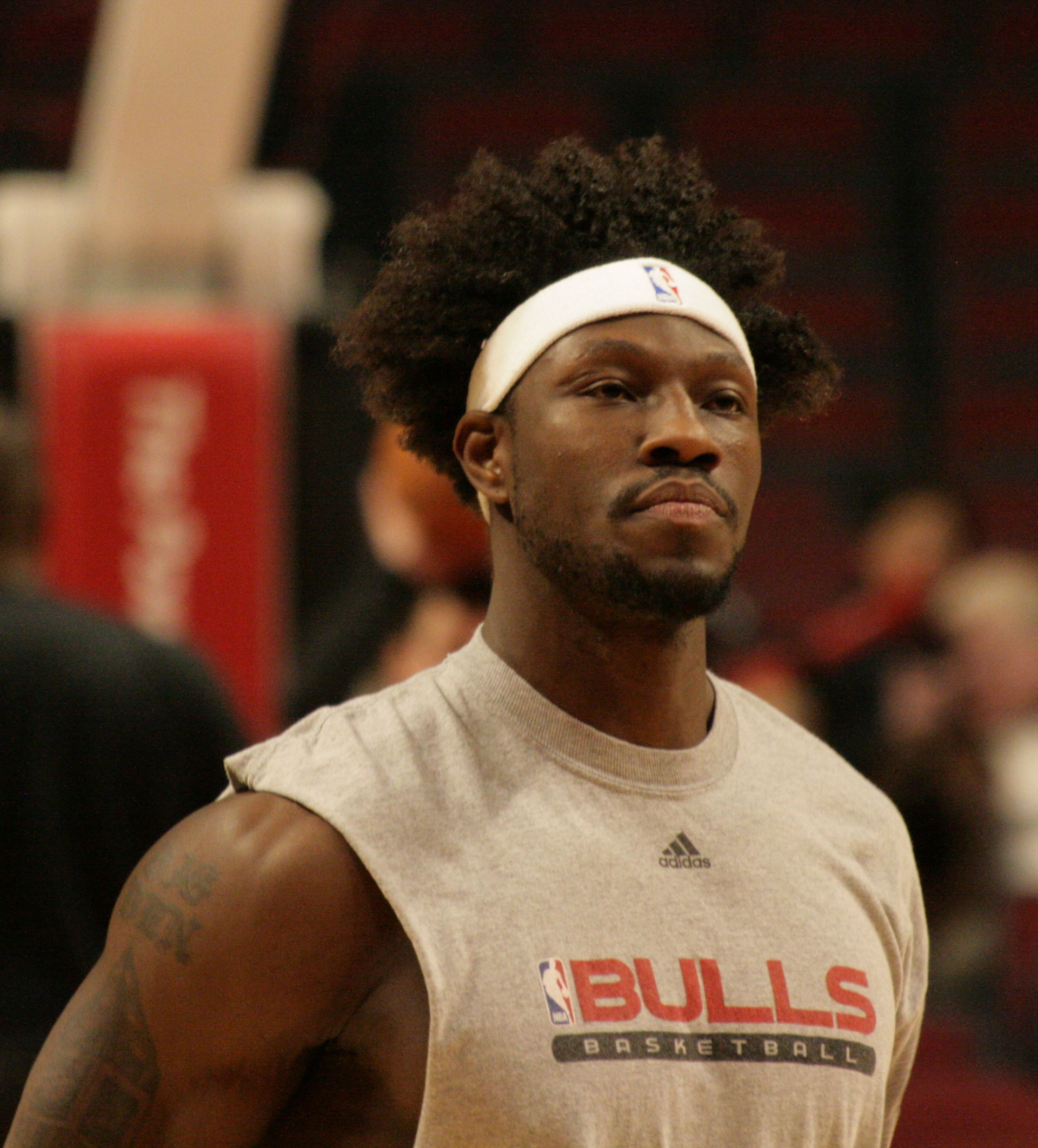
Wallace during his tenure with the Bulls in 2008

In July 2006, Wallace agreed to a four-year, $60 million deal with the Chicago Bulls. Chicago Bulls coach Scott Skiles had a strict "no-headband" policy, but decided to make an exception for Wallace when his teammates voted in favor of allowing him to keep the signature headband. Wallace continued to be relied upon as a defensive stopper and rebounder, as the Bulls already featured scoring from Kirk Hinrich, Ben Gordon, and Luol Deng. While his overall averages decreased from previous years, he still managed to average double figure rebounds (10.7 per game) and posted 2.0 blocks per game for the season. The Bulls won 49 games, and entered the playoffs with a first round matchup against the defending champion Miami Heat.

The series between the Heat and Bulls would mark the fourth straight year that Wallace faced off with Shaquille O'Neal in the playoffs. The Bulls shocked Miami with a four-game sweep with an average win margin of 11 points, becoming the first team to sweep the defending champions in a first round series in NBA history. Wallace posted 13 points with 11 rebounds in the close out game in Miami, and the Bulls advanced to face his former Pistons team. Despite no longer featuring Wallace and being older, the Pistons dominated the first three games to take a 3–0 lead before Chicago responded at home in game 4 with Wallace scoring 11 points with 17 rebounds. Chicago also went on to win Game 5 in Detroit, but could not extend the series to a seventh game as the Pistons proved too experienced for the younger team. Wallace averaged 8.7 points with 9.5 rebounds in 10 playoff games.

The Bulls started the 2007–08 season with a 9–16 record before Skiles was removed as head coach. During his nearly two-year run in Chicago, Wallace battled with various knee injuries and averaged 5.7 points, 9.7 rebounds, 1.9 assists and 2.0 blocks per game.

=== Cleveland Cavaliers (2008–2009) ===
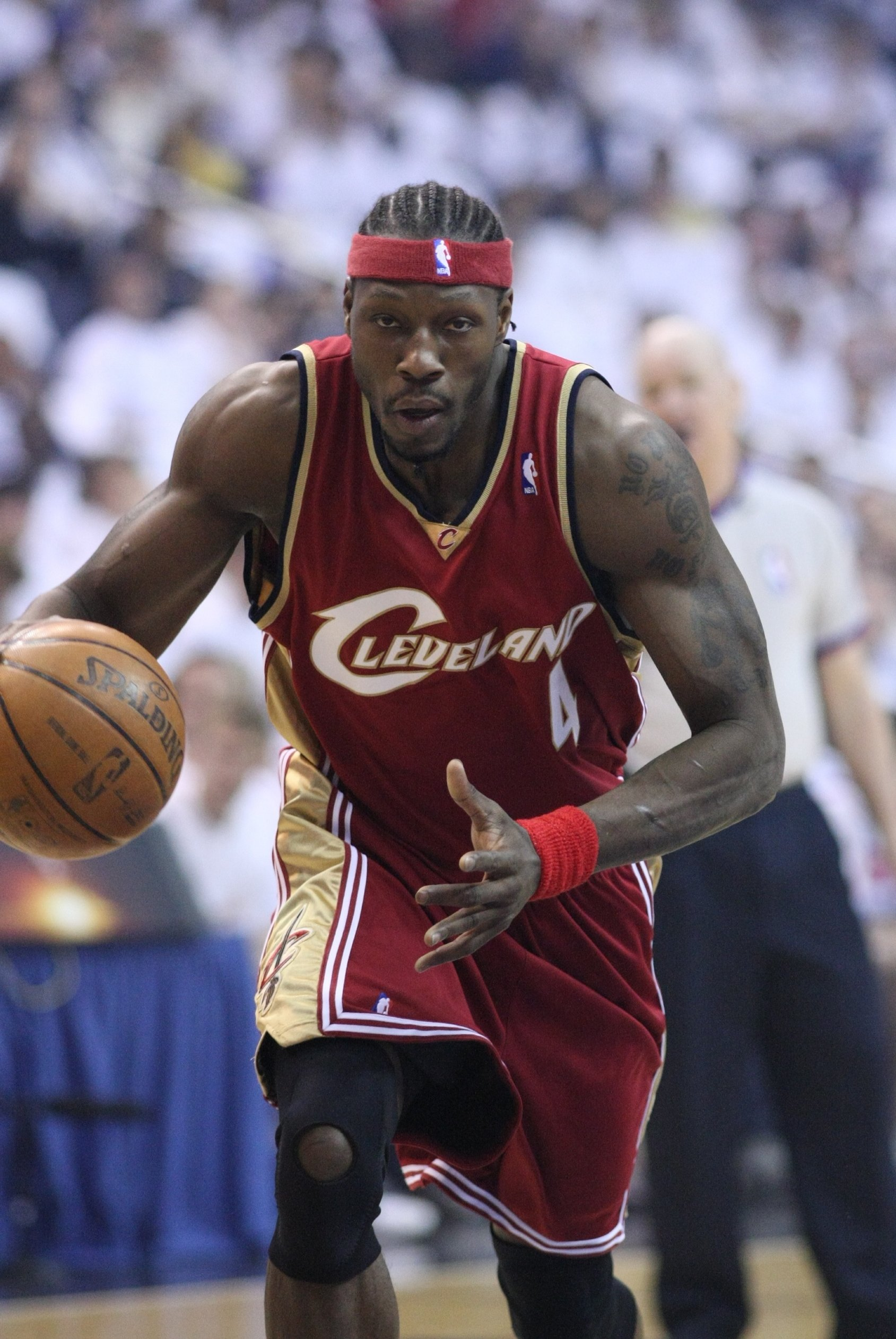
Wallace with the Cavaliers in 2008

In February 2008, Wallace was traded to the Cleveland Cavaliers in a three-team deal involving the Seattle SuperSonics, in which the Cavaliers received Wallace, as well as Bulls teammate Joe Smith and Seattle's Wally Szczerbiak and Delonte West. The Bulls received Shannon Brown, Larry Hughes, Cedric Simmons, and Drew Gooden from the Cavaliers, and the Sonics received Cleveland's Ira Newble and Donyell Marshall and Chicago's Adrian Griffin.

The Cavaliers already featured Zydrunas Ilgauskas as the team's starting center, so coach Mike Brown moved Wallace to the power forward position. Wallace played in 22 regular season games (all starts) and averaged 4.2 points, 7.4 rebounds and 1.7 blocks per game. Wallace had a Cavalier regular season high of 12 points on February 24, 2008, against the Memphis Grizzlies, and had regular season Cavaliers' highs of 15 rebounds against the Charlotte Bobcats and four blocks against the Orlando Magic. In the playoffs, Wallace played in 13 games (all starts) and averaged 3.2 points, 6.5 rebounds and 1.1 blocks per game.

On June 25, 2009, Wallace was traded to the Phoenix Suns with Sasha Pavlović, a second-round draft pick and $500,000 for Shaquille O'Neal. On July 13, 2009, the Suns bought out Wallace's $14 million contract, saving $8 million in the process. Wallace actually received $10 million but Phoenix was in luxury tax so the savings were effectively doubled.

=== Return to Detroit (2009–2012) ===
On August 7, 2009, Wallace agreed to re-sign with the Pistons as a free agent to a one-year deal. He formerly wore jersey No. 3 with the Pistons, but changed his jersey to No. 6 upon his return, allowing Rodney Stuckey to keep that number. On July 11, 2010, Wallace agreed to a two-year deal with the Pistons.

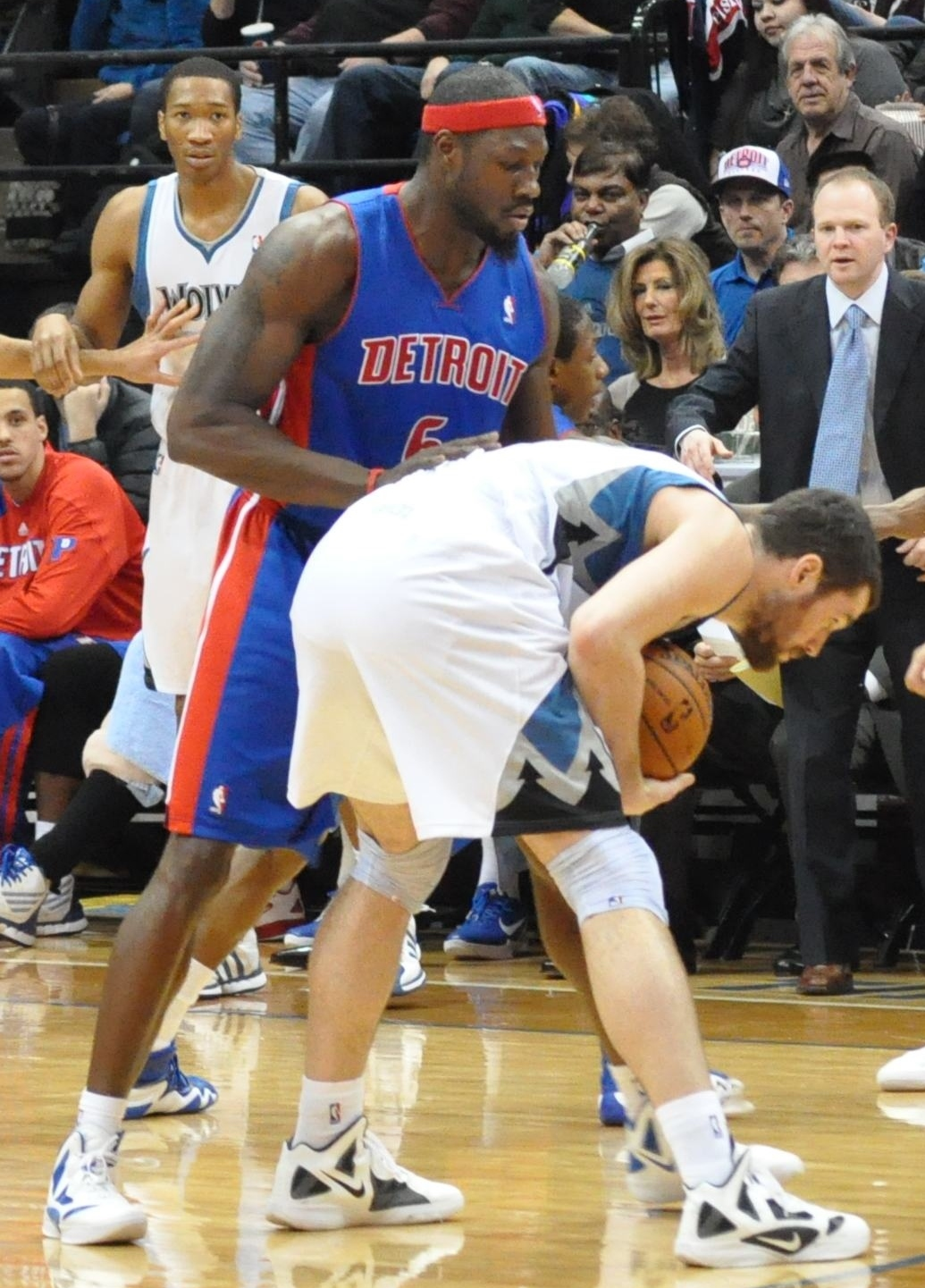
Wallace defending Kevin Love, 2012

On August 4, 2010, Wallace was re-signed by the Pistons. On November 30, 2010, in a 90–79 road loss to the Orlando Magic, Wallace surpassed the 10,000-rebound mark for his career, becoming the 34th player in NBA history to achieve that mark.

On December 22, 2010, in a 115–93 road win over the Toronto Raptors, Wallace played his 1,000th game and became the 95th player in NBA history to achieve this record. On February 14, 2012, Wallace played his 1,055th game, surpassing the record held by Avery Johnson for most games by an undrafted player.

On January 16, 2016, the Pistons retired Wallace's No. 3 jersey.

In 2021 Wallace was inducted into the Naismith Memorial Basketball Hall of Fame.

== National team career ==
Wallace played for the United States Men's national basketball team at the 2002 FIBA World Championship squads.

== Player profile ==
Wallace was listed at 6 ft 9 in (2.06 m), though he has stated that he is closer to 6 ft 7 in (2.01 m). Even though his height was more suited for the power forward position, he primarily played as center due to his strength and athleticism, especially the acceleration with which he could jump. Wallace became known for his prolific rebounding and shot blocking. He was voted the NBA Defensive Player of the Year four times in five years, finishing as a close runner-up in the other season. He is one of only five players to collect more blocks than personal fouls (minimum 150 games) and the only player among those to also have more steals than turnovers.

However, Wallace was never a potent scorer, averaging 5.7 points per game in his career. The majority of his points came from offensive put-backs, baskets in transition, or other high-percentage field goals. Wallace also holds the record for worst free-throw shooting percentage in NBA history, at under 42 percent (minimum 1,000 free-throw attempts).

== Career achievements ==
=== Awards and honors ===
- NBA champion: 2004
- 4× NBA All-Star: 2003, 2004, 2005, 2006
- 4× NBA Defensive Player of the Year: 2002, 2003, 2005, 2006
- 6× All-NBA Defensive Team:
  - First Team: 2002, 2003, 2004, 2005, 2006
  - Second Team: 2007
- 5× All-NBA Team:
  - Second Team: 2003, 2004, 2006
  - Third Team: 2002, 2005
- Number 3 retired by the Detroit Pistons
- Michigan Sports Hall of Fame: 2016
- Only undrafted player in NBA history to be voted a starter for the NBA All-Star Game (as of 2003).
- One of three players in NBA history to receive NBA Defensive Player of the Year Award four times (along with Dikembe Mutombo, and Rudy Gobert.)
- First undrafted player in modern NBA history to be elected into the Naismith Memorial Basketball Hall of Fame.

=== NBA records and achievements ===
- 2× NBA rebounding leader (rebounds per game): 2002 (13.0), 2003 (15.4)
- 2× NBA rebounding leader (total rebounds): 2001 (1,052), 2003 (1,126)
- NBA rebounding leader (total defensive rebounds): 2001 (749)
- 2× NBA rebounding leader (total offensive rebounds): 2003 (293), 2006 (301)
- NBA blocks leader: 2002 (3.5)
- NBA blocks leader (total blocks): 2002 (278)

=== Detroit Pistons franchise records ===
- Most blocks (all-time): 1,486 (2000–2006, 2009–2012)
- Most blocks in one season: 278 (2001–02)
- Highest blocks per game average (all-time): 2.3 (2000–2006, 2009–2012)
- Highest blocks per game average (season): 3.5 (2001–02)

== NBA career statistics ==
Legend
GP	Games played	GS	Games started	MPG	Minutes per game
FG%	Field goal percentage	3P%	3-point field goal percentage	FT%	Free throw percentage
RPG	Rebounds per game	APG	Assists per game	SPG	Steals per game
BPG	Blocks per game	PPG	Points per game	**Bold**	Career high
†	Won an NBA championship	*	Led the league

=== Regular season ===
Year	Team	GP	GS	MPG	FG%	3P%	FT%	RPG	APG	SPG	BPG	PPG
1996–97	Washington	34	0	5.8	.348	—	.300	1.7	.1	.2	.3	1.1
1997–98	Washington	67	16	16.8	.518	—	.357	4.8	.3	.9	1.1	3.1
1998–99	Washington	46	16	26.8	**.578**	—	.356	8.3	.4	1.1	2.0	6.0
1999–00	Orlando	81	81	24.2	.503	—	.474	8.2	.8	.9	1.6	4.8
2000–01	Detroit	80	79	34.5	.490	.250	.336	13.2	1.5	1.3	2.3	6.4
2001–02	Detroit	80	80	36.5	.531	.000	.423	13.0*	1.4	1.7	**3.5***	7.6
2002–03	Detroit	73	73	**39.4**	.481	.167	.450	**15.4***	1.6	1.4	3.2	6.9
2003–04†	Detroit	81	81	37.7	.421	.125	**.490**	12.4	1.7	**1.8**	3.0	9.5
2004–05	Detroit	74	74	36.1	.453	.111	.428	12.2	1.7	1.4	2.4	**9.7**
2005–06	Detroit	**82***	**82***	35.2	.510	.000	.416	11.3	1.9	**1.8**	2.2	7.3
2006–07	Chicago	77	77	35.0	.453	.200	.408	10.7	**2.4**	1.4	2.0	6.4
2007–08	Chicago	50	50	32.5	.373	.000	.424	8.8	1.8	1.4	1.6	5.1
2007–08	Cleveland	22	22	26.3	.457	—	.432	7.4	.6	.9	1.7	4.2
2008–09	Cleveland	56	53	23.5	.445	—	.422	6.5	.8	.9	1.3	2.9
2009–10	Detroit	69	67	28.6	.541	.000	.406	8.7	1.5	1.2	1.2	5.5
2010–11	Detroit	54	49	22.9	.450	**.500**	.333	6.5	1.3	1.0	1.0	2.9
2011–12	Detroit	62	11	15.8	.395	.250	.340	4.3	.7	.8	.8	1.4
Career		1088	912	29.5	.474	.137	.414	9.6	1.3	1.3	2.0	5.7
All-Star		4	2	21.5	.400	.000	.000	7.0	.5	2.0	1.2	3.0

=== Playoffs ===
Year	Team	GP	GS	MPG	FG%	3P%	FT%	RPG	APG	SPG	BPG	PPG
2002	Detroit	10	10	40.8	.475	—	.436	16.1	1.2	1.9	2.6	7.3
2003	Detroit	17	17	**42.5**	.486	.000	.446	**16.3**	1.6	**2.5**	**3.1**	8.9
2004†	Detroit	23*	23*	40.2	.454	.000	.427	14.3	**1.9**	1.9	2.4	**10.3**
2005	Detroit	**25***	**25***	39.2	.481	.000	.461	11.3	1.0	1.7	2.4	10.0
2006	Detroit	18	18	35.7	.465	.000	.273	10.5	1.7	1.3	1.2	4.7
2007	Chicago	10	10	36.9	.566	.000	**.500**	9.5	1.4	1.5	1.7	8.7
2008	Cleveland	13	13	23.4	.515	—	.350	6.5	1.2	.6	1.1	3.2
2009	Cleveland	14	0	12.6	**.615**	—	.000	2.7	.3	.3	.3	1.1
Career		130	116	34.8	.482	.000	.418	11.2	1.3	1.5	1.9	7.2

== Executive career ==
In 2018, Wallace joined the Pistons' NBA G League affiliate, the Grand Rapids Drive, as an ownership partner, serving in that role until they became an affiliate of the Denver Nuggets and renamed the Gold. In 2021, he was named the Pistons' basketball operations and team engagement advisor.

== Personal life ==
Wallace is married to Chanda Wallace and is the father of two sons, Ben Jr. and Bryce, and one daughter, Bailey.

Wallace appeared on the cover of ESPN NBA 2K5. An inflatable basketball training aid of Wallace's likeness, called the Inflatable Defender, was manufactured by PlayAir Systems. His sneaker, the Big Ben, was released on November 5, 2007, under Stephon Marbury's Starbury label and sold for US$14.98 ($23.26 with inflation) at Steve & Barry's stores.

In 2011, Wallace was arrested and charged with DWI and carrying a concealed weapon. He was sentenced to a year of probation.

In March 2014, Wallace was sentenced to a year of jail, with all but two days suspended, after he pleaded guilty to leaving the scene of an accident in Richmond, Virginia, on February 8, 2014.

In 2022, Wallace launched his line of cannabis products named "Undrafted" developed in partnership with the cannabis company Rair. Wallace stated: "Cannabis has helped me safely relieve the aches and pains and different stressors that have built up from the many years as an athlete. There's no denying that marijuana has a healing upside for athletes or anyone struggling with pain — so alongside launching the Undrafted brand, the Rair team and I will continue to push to end this stigma associated with cannabis use." That year, he also purchased a minority stake in Green Door Distilling.

== See also ==
- List of NBA career rebounding leaders
- List of NBA career blocks leaders
- List of NBA career playoff rebounding leaders
- List of NBA career playoff blocks leaders
- List of NBA annual rebounding leaders
- List of NBA annual blocks leaders
- List of NBA single-season rebounding leaders
- List of NBA single-game blocks leaders
- List of people banned or suspended by the NBA
