= Ruth Reese =

American-Norwegian singer, poet, and civil rights activist (1921–1990)

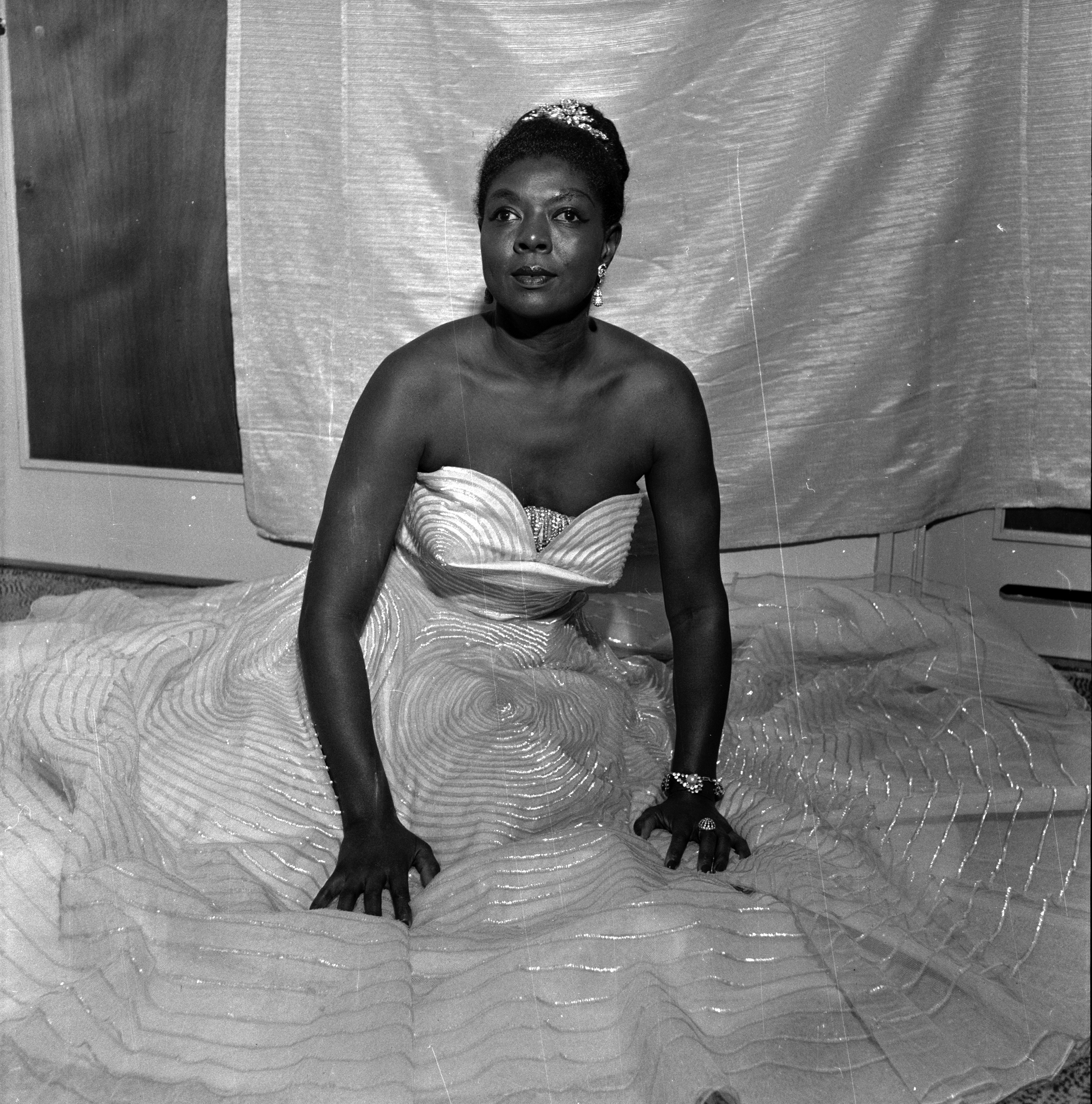
- 1959
- Born: 10 March 1921; Hayneville, Alabama
- Died: 25 October 1990 (aged 69); Oslo, Norway
- Occupations: singer, writer, civil rights activist

Ruth Reese (10 March 1921 – 25 October 1990) was an African American-Norwegian singer, writer and civil rights activist. She was one of the first prominent black singers in Norway and was actively involved in the international fight against racism. Over several decades, she contributed significantly to the understanding of African American history and music in Norway.

== Early life ==
Ruth Reese was born on 10 March 1921 in Hayneville, Alabama to Sarah (née Hunter) and William Reese. In her childhood, the family moved to Chicago, where Reese attended school and sang in the church choir. Without adequate funds to pursue music studies, she worked as a domestic after school to pay for music lessons. After completing her secondary studies, Reese attended Northwestern University in Evanston, Illinois earning a bachelor's degree in music.

== Career ==
After her graduation, Reese first worked as a physical training instructor and choir director at Madden Park, before being hired as a substitute teacher Throughout the 1940s, Reese performed in the Chicago area, entering musical contests, winning several local awards, and earning promising reviews. In 1949, she appeared in the role of Mougali in the premiere performance of the opera Ouanga by Clarence Cameron White. Earning acclaim and a scholarship for her performance, Reese moved to New York City, to continue her voice training with Léon Rothier and Lawrence Brown.

After her concert debut in 1952, Reese moved to England and studied Amanda Aldridge. Her European debut was at the Salle Gaveau in Paris in 1953. Though classically trained, she gained her reputation from performing Spirituals, Gospel music and the Blues with their roots in African-American tradition. Touring Europe, she performed both on stage and on the airwaves in Czechoslovakia, England, France, Israel, Italy, Spain, Switzerland and throughout Scandinavia. She first came to Norway in 1956, where she drew attention for the color of her skin, often billed as a negersangerinne (negro songstress). At the time, Norwegian society viewed itself as homogeneously white and had not recognized its indigenous or national minority populations. Reese found similar situations to those she had experienced in the United States, when she was denied lodging numerous times. She persevered, making a name for herself and fell in love. In 1960, she permanently settled in Oslo, Norway and two years later married the bookstore owner Paul Shetelig.

Reese began publishing about racial issues in newspapers like the Dagbladet. In a piece published in 1959, Vår hud er sort (Our Skin is Black), she addressed the Norwegian indifference to racist policies in the United States or South Africa, such as the selling of South African fruits and wines, and began to draw awareness of the problems Africans and black people faced. Public debate on race began for the first time, the university sponsored a series of talks Racism and Democracy, and in 1960, the national trade union proposed a boycott on South African goods. Reese actively took part in the movement to raise awareness, giving a lecture De amerikanske negrenes musikkhistorie gjennom 360 år (The American Negro's Music History Through 360 Years) throughout the country, in which she explained the difference between Spirituals and Classical music. She felt that to be properly performed, Spirituals could not be sung by white interpreters because "[t]he tones are created in tears. One must feel this pain in the soul to make it sound right". In 1963, to show solidarity with President John F. Kennedy's Civil Rights Agenda and the March on Washington for Jobs and Freedom, Reese collected signatures on a petition and led supporters in a march to the Oslo home of the American ambassador.

In addition to her activism, Reese continued to perform throughout Norway and had wide popularity. She was one of the first black artists to become established in Norway and was a major contributor to the spread of African music in the country. In 1972, a collection of her writings was published in Norwegian, Lang svart vei (Long Black Road) and in 1979, she released an album Motherless Child in 1979. In 1985, she published her autobiography, Min vei (My Way), in which she acknowledged that her activism had impacted her career, but was unapologetic for speaking for those who could not "express their despair". In 1990, she produced the short film Pride of Black Dreams which presented a brief history of African American through song and dance. It was shown widely in schools and on NRK Television.

== Death and legacy ==
Reese died on 25 October 1990 while giving an address against racism to the organization SOS Rasisme at a gathering being held in Oslo in her honor. Reese's archives were left to her student Kristin Asbjørnsen, who has made recordings in honor of her teacher. In 2013, Asbjørnsen explained that it had taken her many years to absorb the underlying messages from the lengthy notes and old recordings she had received. Only then was she ready to release albums inspired by Reese's approach.

14 private photo albums and scrapbooks that she owned, and her unpublished manuscripts were left to The MiRA Resource Center for Black, Immigrant and Refugee Women. The MiRA Center has donated photo albums and scrapboks to "the Oslo city archive" Byarkivet (source www.mirasenteret.no).

A square in Grünerløkka is named in her honour.
