= Lowndes County Freedom Organization =

American political party in Alabama

- Chairperson: John Hulett
- Founded: 1965
- Dissolved: 1970
- Merged into: Alabama Democratic Party
- Headquarters: Lowndes County, Alabama
- Ideology: African-American interests Racial equality
- Political position: Left-wing

The Lowndes County Freedom Organization (LCFO), also known as the Lowndes County Freedom Party (LCFP) and the Black Panther Party, was an American political party founded during 1965 in Lowndes County, Alabama. The independent third party was formed by local African-American citizens led by John Hulett, and by staff members of the Student Nonviolent Coordinating Committee (SNCC) under the leadership of Stokely Carmichael. Dubbed the "original Black Panther Party", the LCFO inspired the formation of the Black Panther Party for Self-Defense, a Black Power organization in Oakland, California, by Huey P. Newton and Bobby Seale in 1966.

== History ==
=== Founding and early history ===
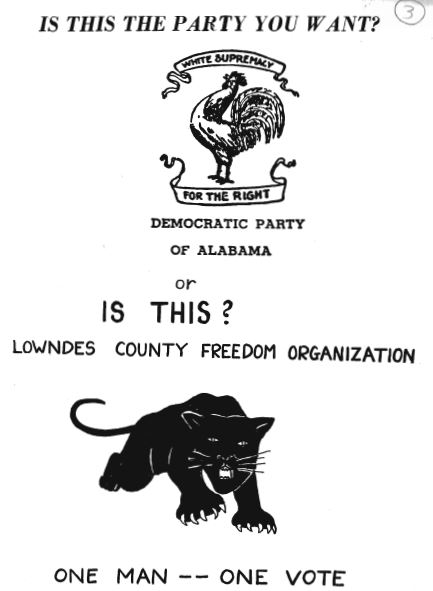
LCFO political ad from 1966 against the Democratic Party of Alabama

On March 23, 1965, as the Selma to Montgomery marches took place, Stokely Carmichael and some in the Student Nonviolent Coordinating Committee (SNCC) who were participants declined to continue marching after reaching Lowndes County and decided to instead stop and talk with local residents, later basing their activities in the county. After word spread that Carmichael challenged and avoided arrest from two officers who ordered him to leave a school where he was registering voters, Carmichael and the SNCC workers were "swarmed" by admirers amongst the county residents. This inspired them to create the Lowndes County Freedom Organization (LCFO) with John Hulett (who, since the banning of the NAACP in the state, had been active in Fred Shuttlesworth's Alabama Christian Movement for Human Rights), and other local leaders.

As the Voting Rights Act of 1965 allowed African-Americans to register to vote, the objective of LCFO was to register African-Americans in a county that was 80% non-White. Hulett, who was LCFO's chairperson, was one of the first two African-American voters whose registration was successfully processed in Lowndes County. Local residents and SNCC staff members decided to avoid joining the Democratic Party because its state party was led by segregationist Governor George Wallace and employed the slogan "White Supremacy" represented by an image of a white rooster. Due to high rates of illiteracy among the Black residents, an image of a black panther was adopted to identify party members of LCFO in contrast to members of the all-White Alabama Democratic Party represented by a white rooster. The logo of the black panther was a symbol of strength, dignity, and self-defense to persuade Black voters away from casting a vote to the wrong candidate. The idea for the logo came from SNCC field secretary Ruth Howard.

=== The first election of 1966 and failure ===
The LFCO represented SNCC's first experiment of independent Black-led activism. During the 1966 election, the LFCO expected the vote to be a landslide due to the community being overwhelmingly African-American. The Lowndes County's number of registered Black voters approached 2,000, which was roughly 39% of all 5,122 eligible Black voters. This was nearly equal to the amount of White people who were registered to vote at the time. Although the Black registration rate was higher than the White rate in Lowndes County at the time of the November 8, 1966 general election, the local Black population still feared White people swaying the election. When the election officials tallied the votes, not a single LFCO candidate was victorious.

Many problems occurred during the process of this election. While the registered Black voters surpassed Whites, so did the number of illiteracy rates in the county. This was a big worry for the LFCO and SNCC because they worried that it would lead to Black voters, voting for the wrong candidate. When election day came, local intimidation was also a factor in the polls. Election officials forced Black residents to vote on a marked ballot, polls were located where White supremacists were outside intimidating and scaring Black voters, and they were also watching them as they voted and viewed their personal ballots.

== Legacy ==
In 1970, after electoral failures in 1966 and 1968, the LCFO merged with the Alabama Democratic Party. This merger resulted in former LCFO candidates winning public offices. Among them was John Hulett, who was elected sheriff of Lowndes County. Hulett served in this position for 22 years before serving three terms as a probate judge. Hulett's election as sheriff was particularly significant, as he became the first Black sheriff of Lowndes County, a place once known as “Bloody Lowndes” for its history of racial violence and voter suppression. His leadership symbolized the success of Black political empowerment in the region, paving the way for greater African-American representation in local government.

Afro-American Association members Huey P. Newton and Bobby Seale from Oakland, California first noticed the black panther symbol through the LCFO's activities in Alabama, during which they used a black panther as a symbol to represent strength and communal dignity. Influenced by the LCFO's example and its broader activism connected to SNCC, Newton and Seale adopted the panther as the logo for their Black Panther Party for Self-Defense (BPP) in 1966, giving it a more militant meaning focused on protecting Black communities. The LCFO's voter identification symbol of a "Black Panther" was adopted by the BPP and other Panther-inspired organizations throughout the United States, such as the White Panther Party. The BPP adopted the logo from the LFCO because they, much like the LFCO, believed the "Black Panther" was a symbol of strength, dignity, and self-defense. In contrast to LFCO, the BPP adopted radical Marxist stances and, drawing lessons from Malcolm X's Ballot or the Bullet speech, were more focused on revolutionary Black nationalism rather than voter registration. The Panthers fought against racial discrimination and police brutality toward the African-American community. The BPP would transmit police radio dispatches and arrive on the scene heavily armed to keep the police officers in line. At one point Newton was seen staring down a policeman who was eager to pull his weapon on an African-American and said to him "Ok, you big fat racist pig, draw your gun." The BPP emphasized self-defense, forming community programs, and protection against inequality in political justice. The BPP also established free breakfast programs, healthcare clinics, and educational initiatives to support Black communities, addressing systemic neglect and providing essential services where the government had failed. These community programs became a cornerstone of the party's activism. LFCO and SNCC organizer Stokely Carmichael would serve as the Honorary Prime Minister of the BPP from 1968 to 1969.

The work of the LCFO was examined in the documentary film Eyes on the Prize within the episode "The Time Has Come (1964–66)". The episode touched on the transition from the "Freedom Now!" civil rights-oriented mindset to the enduring "Black Power!" Black nationalist movement, which still has a lasting impact on American racial movements today.

== See also ==
- Civil rights movement
- Black Panther Party for Self-Defense
- Mississippi Freedom Democratic Party
