= Bad-jacketing =

Planting doubt on an individual's bona fides or identity

Bad-jacketing is a term for planting doubt on the authenticity of an individual's bona fides or identity. An example would be creating suspicion through spreading false rumors, manufacturing evidence, etc., that falsely portrays someone in a community organization as an informant, a "Fed", member of law enforcement, or guilty of malfeasance such as skimming organization funds.

Fed-jacketing, and Snitch-jacketing are variants of bad-jacketing that specifically aim to present the target as an informer.

== History ==
Scholar Mark Anthony Neal writes that the Federal Bureau of Investigation (FBI) under J. Edgar Hoover used the technique against the Black Panther Party (BPP) and other Black Power organizations as part of its COINTELPRO operations. Neal writes that this technique was effective in isolating key individuals, forcing them out of the organization, and that its effectiveness was enhanced by the tendency of Black Power activists to divide along "rigid racial, ideological, and increasingly gendered" lines. The practice was notably used by FBI informants to create a climate of suspicion within New Left groups such as the Black Panther Party and American Indian Movement (AIM), which resulted in the murders of some activists who had been subjected to bad-jacketing, including Panther Alex Rackley, as well as AIM activists Pedro Bissonette, Byron DeSersa and Anna Mae Aquash.

Jo Durden-Smith writes that this technique was used by U.S. prison guards to undermine targeted prisoners and thus make them vulnerable to manipulation.

== See also ==
- List of slang terms for law enforcement and intelligence operatives

== Bibliography ==
- Churchill, Ward; Vander Wall, Jim (2002). "Assassinations and Badjacketing". Agents of Repression: The FBI's Secret Wars Against the Black Panther Party and the American Indian Movement. Cambridge, Massachusetts: South End Press. pp. 49–51, 199–217. ISBN 0896086461. OCLC 50985124.
- Churchill, Ward (2011). "The Security Industrial Complex". In Best, Steven; Kahn, Richard; Nocella II, Anthony J.; McLaren, Peter (eds.). The Global Industrial Complex: Systems of Domination. Lanham, Maryland: Lexington Books. p. 49. ISBN 978-0739136997. OCLC 798970766.
- Durden-Smith, Jo (1976), Who killed George Jackson?, New York: Alfred A. Knopf : distributed by Random House, ISBN 0394482913, OCLC 2034789, 0394482913
- Neal, Mark Anthony (2013) [1999]. What the Music Said: Black Popular Music and Black Public Culture. New York: Routledge. ISBN 978-1135204624. OCLC 858861411.
- Newton, Michael (2015) [2003]. The FBI Encyclopedia. Jefferson, North Carolina: McFarland & Company. p. 318. ISBN 978-1476604176. OCLC 953847288.
