= Billy Parker (baseball) =

American baseball player (1942–2003)

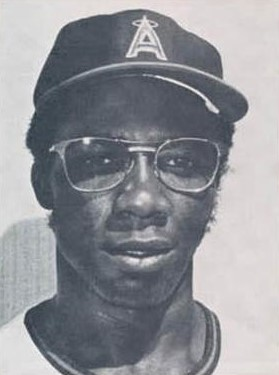
- Second baseman
- Born: January 14, 1942; Hayneville, Alabama
- Died: February 9, 2003 (aged 61); Sun City West, Arizona
- Batted: Right Threw: Right

MLB debut
- September 9, 1971, for the California Angels

Last MLB appearance
- September 29, 1973, for the California Angels

MLB statistics
- Batting average: .222
- Home runs: 3
- Runs batted in: 21
- Stats at Baseball Reference

Teams
- California Angels (1971–1973)

William David Parker (January 14, 1942 – February 9, 2003) was a professional baseball player who played parts of three seasons for the California Angels of Major League Baseball. He is the first player to hit a walk-off homer in his major league debut, doing so on September 9, 1971 for the Angels in the 12th inning.

Parker's professional baseball career began in 1961 with the Negro league Indianapolis Clowns, where he played through 1964. He was selected by the New York Yankees from the Salt Lake City Angels in the Rule 5 draft on December 3, 1973.
