= John Hulett =

American civil rights activist and politician

John Hulett around 1966

John Hulett (November 19, 1927 – August 21, 2006) was an American civil rights activist, sheriff and judge. He was a leader in the civil rights movement in Lowndes County, Alabama, United States, and the founder of the Lowndes County Christian Movement for Human Rights. He was also the first chairperson of Lowndes County Freedom Organization (LCFO) in 1966, known as the original Black Panther Party.

== Civil rights activist ==
In 1948, Hulett left his family farm in Gordonville, Lowndes County, and began to work in the furnace rooms at the Birmingham Stove and Range Company. Workplace discrimination such as unequal pay for African American workers prompted Hulett to join Local 1489 of the foundry workers' union. Hulett also joined the Alabama NAACP. Following the directions of its president, W. C. Patton, Hulett worked to expand NAACP and encouraged African Americans to register to vote. When NAACP was outlawed in Alabama, Hulett joined Alabama Christian Movement for Human Rights, a new organization founded by Fred Shuttlesworth.

In 1959, when returning home to help his sick father with the family farm, Hulett also brought the civil rights movement to Lowndes County. In the county where 81 percent of people were black but without any black voters, Hulett organized meetings and discussed voting registration with his black neighbors. In March 1965, Hulett and John C. Lawson, a preacher, became the first two black voters in Lowndes County in more than six decades. By the time the Voting Rights Act was enacted in the summer of 1965, at least 50 blacks were registered to vote.

After the Student Nonviolent Coordinating Committee (SNCC) arrived in Lowndes County in the summer of 1965, Hulett became a supporter and later worked full-time for SNCC. Hulett was instrumental in the founding of LCFO. Hulett would serve as LCFO's chairperson and was also one of the first of two African American voters whose registration was successfully processed in Lowndes County. According to Hulett, LCFO's symbol – the snarling black panther – represents the "strength and dignity of black demands today". Hulett also explained that the black panther is "an animal that when it is pressured it moves back until it is cornered, then it comes out fighting for life or death," and that the symbol was fitting for the oppressed black community to take back power. In Lowndes County, the black panther was an emblem for democracy. However, the symbol obtained a different meaning of black power and militancy after the black panther symbol was adopted by Black Panther Party in Oakland, one that Hulett and his colleagues did not fully agree.

== Political career ==
As an independent political party, LCFO joined the November 1966 county government election with a slate of twelve candidates. By then, LCFO had been able to get 2,758 of the 13,000 blacks in Lowndes County registered to vote. Hulett himself was running for county sheriff but none of the LCFO candidates won. Hulett was later elected as the county sheriff on a National Democratic Party of Alabama ticket in 1970. This electoral win was one of the most tangible changes brought about by the voting rights movement, as local residents no longer had to worry about arbitrary use of force against them. Hulett promised he would treat whites and blacks with equal respect as a sheriff, and try to heal the past wound of the county. He became not only a civil rights activist fighting against racial segregation but a symbol of reconciliation.

Hulett would continue to serve as county sheriff for 22 years. He then served as a probate judge of Lowndes County for three terms. He was the first black person to serve the two positions in Lowndes County.

== Other activities ==
Hulett considered the black people's economic dependence on whites a significant barrier to their free and equal political participation in Alabama. Hulett worked closely with the War on Poverty program, which empowered the local black residents. He had served on the board of the Lowndes County Office of Equal Opportunity health program, then the only biracial board in the county.

Although Hulett had found the Democratic Party an untrustworthy ally and advocated for forming a separate black people's political group, he became a Democrat in late 1972 and endorsed George Wallace for reelection as governor. According to Hulett, the main reason for this reluctant change in political affiliation was to secure aid for local programs, as social welfare program funding for Lowndes had been cut under Richard Nixon.

== Personal life ==
Hulett's second marriage was to Eddie Mae Aaron. They had two daughters and one son. One of his sons from a previous marriage, John Hulett Jr., also served as probate judge of Lowndes County. Hulett's son-in-law's uncle the late John "Big John" Williams was also sheriff until his untimely death on November 23, 2019.

== See also ==
- List of African-American jurists

== Bibliography ==
- Ali, Omar H.; Foner, Eric (2008). In the Balance of Power: Independent Black Politics and Third-Party Movements in the United States. Ohio University Press. ISBN 978-0-8214-4288-3.
- Gaillard, Frye (2006). Cradle of Freedom: Alabama and the Movement That Changed America. The University of Alabama Press. ISBN 978-0-8173-8708-2.
- Greenshaw, Wayne (2011). Fighting the Devil in Dixie: How Civil Rights Activists Took on the Ku Klux Klan in Alabama. Chicago Review Press. pp. 211-5. ISBN 9781569768259.
- Jeffries, Hasan Kwame (2009). Bloody Lowndes : civil rights and Black power in Alabama's Black Belt. New York: New York University Press. ISBN 978-0-8147-4305-8. OCLC 276816664.
- Minchin, Timothy (2011). After the Dream: Black and White Southerners since 1965. The University Press of Kentucky. ISBN 978-0-8131-2988-4.
