= Catherine Coleman Flowers =

American environmental health researcher and writer (born 1958)

- Born: 1958 (age 67–68); Birmingham, Alabama, U.S.
- Education: Cameron University; University of Nebraska at Kearney
- Employer(s): The Center for Rural Enterprise and Environmental Justice
- Known for: Environmental activism
- Awards: MacArthur Fellow (2020)

Catherine Coleman Flowers (born 1958) is an American environmental health researcher, writer and the founder of the Center for Rural Enterprise and Environmental Justice. She was selected as a MacArthur Fellow in 2020. Her first book, Waste: One Woman's Fight Against America's Dirty Secret, explores the environmental justice movement in rural America. She is known for bringing attention to failing sewage treatment infrastructure in rural U.S. communities, particularly in Lowndes County, Alabama.

== Early life ==
Flowers was born in Birmingham, Alabama in 1958 as the oldest of five children to father J.C Coleman, a salesman and military veteran, and Mattie (née DeBardelaben) Coleman, a teacher's aide. Flowers and her family would relocate to Lowndes County in 1968. Flowers was inspired to pursue environmental activism by her parents, who were influential community activists during the American Civil Rights Movement. Her upbringing was contextualized by a deep understanding of the political and cultural history of Lowndes County, particularly its history of racial violence. On her father's side, Flowers is descended from slaves living in Lowndes County during the 1800s.

When Flowers was a teenager, her mother was sterilized without her consent after giving birth to Flowers’ fourth and final sibling, a boy. When she was 16, Flowers became a Robert Kennedy Fellow and got involved in civic issues facing her high school and larger community. Flowers learned that her principal, Robert Pierce, was allegedly involved in the death of a nine-year-old Black girl. This encouraged her to expose the misconduct and poor conditions at her high school—which was segregated in practice—and was eventually successful in getting Pierce and the school board superintendent to resign. These events in Flowers’ adolescence were instrumental in inspiring activism in her adulthood.

== Education and early career ==
Flowers began her post-secondary education at Alabama State University, eventually taking a break to join the Air National Guard and the Air Force. She would spend three years in the air force before leaving due to experiencing sexual harassment. After moving to Oklahoma with her husband, she earned her bachelor's degree at Cameron University in 1986. Flowers started her professional life as a geography teacher in Detroit and an advocate for civil rights, being appointed as the executive director of the National Voting Rights Museum. As Flowers became more involved with activism, she took on different roles, including leading the NAACP Voter Empowerment Program. She eventually returned to academia and joined the University of Nebraska at Kearney for a master's degree in history.

== Career ==
In 2001, Flowers moved back to Alabama, where she concentrated on economic development as part of the Lowndes County Commission. The population of Lowndes County is three-quarters Black. By 2002, she had identified several failings of the local sanitation; including people being arrested for not paying for on-site septic systems and people who were paying for on-site sanitation not being provided adequate provisions. Flowers was surprised that the government was targeting the poorest members of society rather than the much wealthier corporate polluters. This experience motivated her to focus on environmental justice and climate. She received federal approval from the United States Environmental Protection Agency (EPA) to produce a plan to address raw sewage in Lowndes County.

In 2011, Flowers worked with a UN Special Rapporteur to better understand poverty and its impacts on infrastructure in Lowndes County, Alabama. Since 2015 Flowers has held a position as Senior Fellow at the Center for Earth Ethics. She spent 2017 as a Franklin Humanities Institute Practitioner in Residence at Duke University. She founded the Center for Rural Enterprise and Environmental Justice in 2019.

Flowers and the Columbia Law School Human Rights Institute investigated how structural inequalities impact access to sanitation and clean water. She identified that marginalised, poverty-stricken rural communities were more likely to suffer from contaminated water and poor sanitation. Together, these permit the spread of intestinal parasitic infections, including hookworm. In 2019, academic JoAnn Kamuf Ward and Flowers published, Flushed and Forgotten: Sanitation and Wastewater in Rural Communities in the United States, in which Flowers wrote, "In Lowndes County, Alabama, and many of the surrounding areas, lack of basic amenities that many Americans take for granted is a way of life,". The report made a series of recommendations, including taking steps to improve accountability, ensuring participation of affected communities in any decision-making, and ensuring access to adequate sanitation on the basis of equality.

In 2019, she delivered expert testimony to the United States Congress in which she urged the government to address the diseases associated with poverty in the United States. She was appointed to the Joe Biden Task Force on Climate Change, which is co-chaired by Alexandria Ocasio-Cortez. Flowers is the only Black member of the task force. In 2021 she was appointed a member of the White House Environmental Justice Advisory Council.

== Personal life ==
Flowers is married to Thurgood Bunche Flowers and has one daughter with him. She grew up following the Missionary Baptist faith.

== Awards and honors ==
- 2004 Interreligious and International Peace Council's Crown of Peace Award for Exemplary Leadership in Reconciliation and Peacemaking
- 2016 Grist 50
- 2017 Women Who Shape the State
- 2020 River Rally River Hero
- 2020 The Jean and Leslie Douglas Pearl Award
- 2020 Studs and Ida Terkel Prize
- 2020 Greenmatters Black Climate Scientists and Scholars Changing the World
- 2020 MacArthur Fellow

== Selected publications ==
- McKenna, Megan L.; McAtee, Shannon; Bryan, Patricia E.; Jeun, Rebecca; Ward, Tabitha; Kraus, Jacob; Bottazzi, Maria E.; Hotez, Peter J.; Flowers, Catherine C.; Mejia, Rojelio (November 8, 2017). "Human Intestinal Parasite Burden and Poor Sanitation in Rural Alabama". The American Journal of Tropical Medicine and Hygiene. 97 (5): 1623–1628. doi:10.4269/ajtmh.17-0396. ISSN 0002-9637. PMC 5817782. PMID 29016326.
- Carrera, Jennifer S.; Flowers, Catherine Coleman (2018). "Sanitation Inequity and the Cumulative Effects of Racism in Colorblind Public Health Policies". American Journal of Economics and Sociology. 77 (3–4): 941–966. doi:10.1111/ajes.12242. ISSN 1536-7150.
- Coleman Flowers, Catherine; Kamuf Ward, JoAnn (2019). "How the Trump Administration's Efforts to Redefine Human Rights Threaten Economic, Social, and Racial Justice" (PDF). HRLR Online. 4.
- Flowers, Catherine Coleman. (2020). Waste one woman's fight against America's dirty secret. Stevenson, Bryan., Recorded Books, Inc. New York: The New Press. ISBN 978-1-62097-609-8. OCLC 1159847838.
