= Dave Dennis (activist) =

American civil rights activist

- Born: David J. Dennis; 1940 (age 85–86) near Omega, Louisiana, U.S.
- Known for: Civil rights activism

David J. Dennis is an American civil rights activist whose involvement began in the early 1960s. Dennis grew up in the segregated area of Omega, Louisiana. He worked as a co-director of the Council of Federated Organizations (COFO), as director of Mississippi's Congress of Racial Equality (CORE), and as one of the organizers of the Mississippi Freedom Summer of 1964. Dennis worked closely with both Bob Moses and Medgar Evers as well as with members of SNCC, the Student Nonviolent Coordinating Committee. His first involvement in the Civil Rights Movement was at a Woolworth sit-in organized by CORE and he went on to become a Freedom Rider in 1961. Since 1989, Dennis has put his activism toward the Algebra Project, a nonprofit organization run by Bob Moses that aims to improve mathematics education for minority children. Dennis also speaks publicly about his experiences in the movement through an organization called Dave Dennis Connections.

== Early life ==
Dave Dennis was born in 1940 on a plantation of a sharecropper in Omega, Louisiana. All he knew was a life of segregation, he says in one interview with Ebony magazine, "I grew up in this life where you had to stay in your place." Dennis grew up extremely poor, in the Shreveport area where people did not have even the most basic utilities and he did not know what it was like to have these basic utilities until he was nine years old. Even after Dennis' family moved to the inner city of Louisiana, black citizens, including his family, were "only able to get basic utilities by entering white territory." He was the first of his family to graduate from high school. He graduated from Southern High School which was connected to Southern University where the beginnings of student protests were forming. Dennis during this time in his life wasn't interested in being a part of any protests or demonstrations, he says, "I didn’t have this interest in civil rights that you might think most people are born with". He did not want any part of the civil rights activism, "Things were happening [in the country] and I was trying to run from them”.

== Career ==
Dave Dennis attended Dillard University in New Orleans and continued to ignore the civil rights protests until he met Doris Castle, who supported the movement, and became involved with the movement through her. "She was handing out meeting flyers and speaking to a group of students on campus one afternoon. I thought she was cute, walked over to talk to her after her presentation and, sooner than I realized, agreed to attend a CORE demonstration," Dennis said. This was Dennis' first demonstration, as part of a sit-in at a Woolworth store in New Orleans.

External videos
- “Eyes on the Prize; Interview with Dave Dennis” conducted in 1985 for the Eyes on the Prize documentary in which he discusses Freedom Summer, Medgar Evers, James Chaney, and his reaction to their murders. Also Dennis' work with the Council of Federated Organizations (COFO) in Mississippi, and the Mississippi Freedom Democratic Party's challenge to the official Democratic Party.

Dennis was one of the Freedom Riders to continue the original Freedom Ride from Alabama to Jackson, Mississippi in 1961. The freedom ride was the turning point in his activism. Dennis dropped out of school and started this new path of his life, although he eventually received his Bachelor of Arts and Bachelor of Science degrees from Dillard University and a Juris Doctor from the University of Michigan Law School. Dennis established CORE presence in Mississippi. He helped his local community by setting up a Home Industry Cooperative in Ruleville, which consisted of eighteen local women who made rugs, quilts, and aprons to sell to northern civil rights supporters. Dennis also spent time in Hattiesburg where he met a local woman, Mattie Bivins, whom he married.

Dennis was frustrated with CORE's lack of support in Mississippi, however, CORE wasn't pleased with Dennis’ strategie. The organization was not pleased because Dennis did not care which organization got the credit for the successes of the movement, yet CORE still valued Dave Dennis. Dennis wanted to establish a voter registration drive in Madison County, Mississippi, as Dennis believed it was an optimal location for a CORE project because Black people made up a majority of the county's population. Dennis proposed to CORE that Canton was in close proximity to Tougaloo College, which made it possible to involve college students in the voter registration drive. CORE agreed, but after two years of violence from the police and threats from the Ku Klux Klan, they were unable to organize the Black communities in Madison County.

In 1964, Dennis and Moses' plan for the Freedom Summer came to life. Dennis brought in white Northerners to bring national attention to the movement, as he knew that white injuries or deaths would bring more media attention. However, during that summer, a tragedy occurred as three of the Freedom Summer volunteers were killed by the Ku Klux Klan. Dennis was impacted greatly by these deaths because he had worked with the volunteers that were killed, and he was originally supposed to be with them, but was not with them because he had bronchitis. Dennis felt at fault for their deaths, stating "I feel very responsible for Chaney and them...you never get over that. I guess I will live with it until the day I die." Dennis gave an impassioned eulogy at James Chaney's funeral, part of which was recreated in the film Mississippi Burning.

The deaths of Andrew Goodman, Michael Schwerner, and Chaney left Dennis cynical and skeptical of the methods and the cost of the Southern Freedom movement.

== After the Civil Rights movement ==
After Dennis left Mississippi, he went to the University of Michigan Law School, received a Juris Doctor degree, and eventually opened a legal practice in Lafayette, Louisiana. In 1989, At a reunion for the anniversary of the Freedom Summer, Dennis reconnected with Bob Moses, and learned of his project to teach algebra to sixth graders in inner-city schools, which interested Dennis. Moses and Dennis wanted to expand the program into the Black public schools of the Mississippi Delta. They expanded the Algebra Project into Mississippi as well as Louisiana, Kentucky, and Arkansas. As of 2014, Dennis maintained the position of director and CEO of the Southern Initiative of the Algebra Project

Dennis's son, David Dennis Jr., conducted in-depth interviews with his father, supplemented with extensive collateral research, which he edited into a first-person memoir of Dennis's years in The Movement. Interspersed with letters from Dennis Jr. to his father, the book reflects on that experience, including the phenomenon of "survivors' guilt," as well as the impact on their father-son relationship. Published in 2022, the book is titled The Movement Made Us. Dennis Jr. is the winner of the 2021 American Mosaic Journalism Prize.

== Other activism ==
- Co-organizer of a challenge to the Mississippi Democratic Party at the 1964 Democratic National Convention and also to the Louisiana Democratic Party at 1972 Democratic National Convention.
- Co-Organizer of numerous sit-ins and demonstrations in New Orleans, Shreveport, and Baton Rouge in Louisiana and in Hattiesburg, Clarksdale, Canton, and Jackson in Mississippi.
- Established the first African American cooperative in the south, the Ruleville Mississippi Quilting Cooperative, which was formed of 18 women from that town.

== Organizations ==
- Co-director of Council of Federated Organizations (COFO)
- Mississippi director of the Congress of Racial Equality (CORE)
- One of the coordinators of the Mississippi Freedom Summer
