= Meredith Kolodner =

American journalist

Meredith Kolodner is an American journalist, and staff writer for the Hechinger Report. She won The Sidney Award for 2019.

== Life ==
She graduated from Brown University and Columbia University School of Journalism. She worked for the New York Daily News, InsideSchools.org and The Investigative Fund of The Nation Institute.

Her work has appeared in the Atlantic, New York Times, WNYC, Washington Monthly and PBS Newshour.
