= Puffin Foundation =

US non-profit organization

- Named after: Puffin
- Formation: 1983; 43 years ago
- Headquarters: 20 Puffin Way; Teaneck, New Jersey, U.S.
- Website: www.puffinfoundation.org

The Puffin Foundation, established in 1983, is a non-profit organization that aims to amplify the voices of minorities who may be underrepresented due to their race, gender, social philosophy, etc. The foundation achieves this mission of fostering free expression by providing grants and resources to local artists and art organizations.

Ultimately, the goal of the Puffin Foundation is to provide people with an understanding that every single person can go out and make change happen.

== History ==
The Puffin Foundation, with more than $14 million in assets split between two independent entities, was seeded with the fortune Perry Rosenstein made in the Allen screw business.

The Puffin Foundation Ltd. received its Certificate of Incorporation of The Foundation as defined in sub-paragraph (a)(5) of Section 402 of the Not-For-Profit Corporation Law and shall be a Type B corporation under Section 201 On January 17, 1983, by the State of New York Department of State. It then received its 501(c)(3) as is a private not-for-profit. Dorothea Violet Rosenstein, née Cohn, was president and funder Perry Rosenstein's wife who volunteered to work with the National Audubon's Dr. Stephen Kress to bring 10- to 14-day-old pufflings from Great Island, Newfoundland to Eastern Egg Rock off the coast of Maine. When these young Puffins were ready to fledge, they were banded with the hope they would return in 2–3 years and start a new colony on this island. The project was successful. The Puffin Foundation Ltd.'s name was chosen in 1983 in honor and memory of Dorothea Rosenstein.

Through his Teaneck, New Jersey–based foundation, Rosenstein states his mission as to fund "as many different areas of expression as possible." Largely, he funds progressive or liberal work. The Bronx-native says that he attended his first protest as a boy atop his father's shoulders.

"I happen to be one of many people that believes in our country and our democracy," said Rosenstein. "I feel that if democracy is threatened, we are all threatened."

== Operations ==
The foundation has two grant cycles per year. The first cycle, which occurs between the months of January and June, typically allocates grant of $1000 to $2500 to individual artists and arts organizations. The second cycle funds media and awards grants to publications that do investigative reporting on issues like labor, the environment, LGBTQ concerns, feminism and women's issues.

Over the years, the foundation has continued to broaden its scope. In 1997, the foundation began a project known as the Puffin Cultural Forum, which funds and hosts performances as well as art exhibits at 20 Puffin Way in Teaneck, NJ. For instance, the Puffin Foundation collaborates with The Nation Institute, on an annual human rights award, the Puffin/Nation Prize for Creative Citizenship, which is given to someone who has done distinctive and courageous social justice work. Thus far, the foundation has awarded this honor to Dolores Huerta of the United Farm Workers, Robert Moses of the Algebra Project, the founders of the Innocence Project, and Cecile Richards of Planned Parenthood. The foundation has also partnered with the organization VoteRiders to spread state-specific information on voter ID requirements.

The Teaneck International Film Festival is a project of the foundation.
