= Amite County Courthouse =

Courthouse in Mississippi

- U.S. National Register of Historic Places
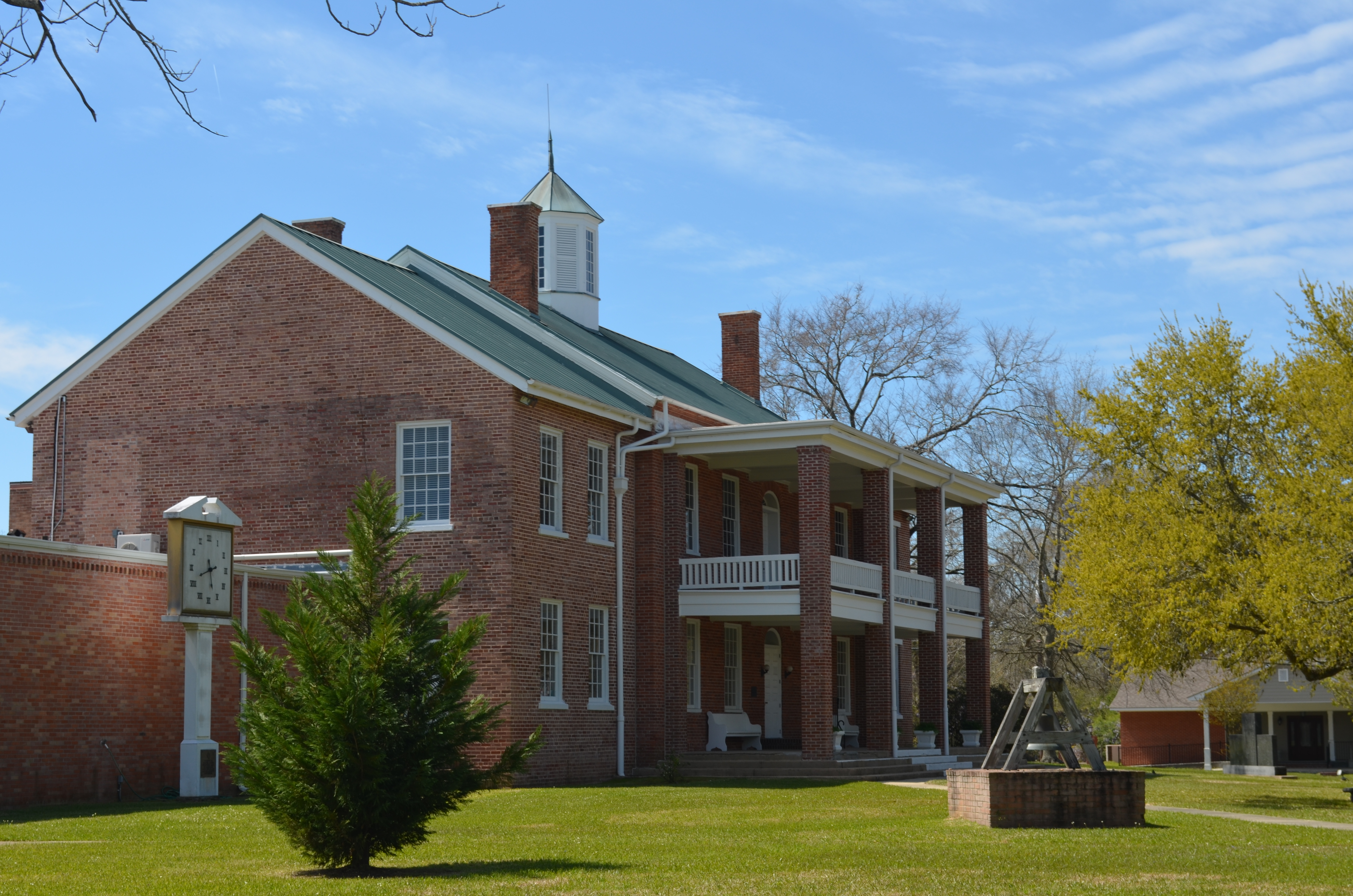

- Location within Mississippi Location within the United States
- Interactive map showing the location of Amite County Courthouse
- Location: Liberty, Mississippi
- Coordinates: 31°09′28″N 90°48′39″W
- Built: 1839-1841
- NRHP reference No.: 74001055
- Added to NRHP: April 9, 1974

Amite County Courthouse is in Liberty, Mississippi, the county seat for Amite County, Mississippi. It was built from 1839–1841 and is the oldest extant county courthouse building in the state. It is a Mississippi Landmark and is listed on the National Register of Historic Places. A historical marker commemorates its history.

== History ==
Slave auctions were held at the courthouse. Annex wings were added to the building with PWA funding in the 1930s. Other additions and renovations have been made over the years. The building is red brick.

Louis Allen tried to register to vote at the courthouse in the 1960s; no African American had voted in the county since the 1890s. He also spoke out about threats and violence including by the sheriff. He was beaten and murdered.

== See also ==
- List of the oldest courthouses in the United States
- National Register of Historic Places listings in Amite County, Mississippi
