= List of awards and nominations received by Tony Kushner =

Tony Kushner awards and nominations
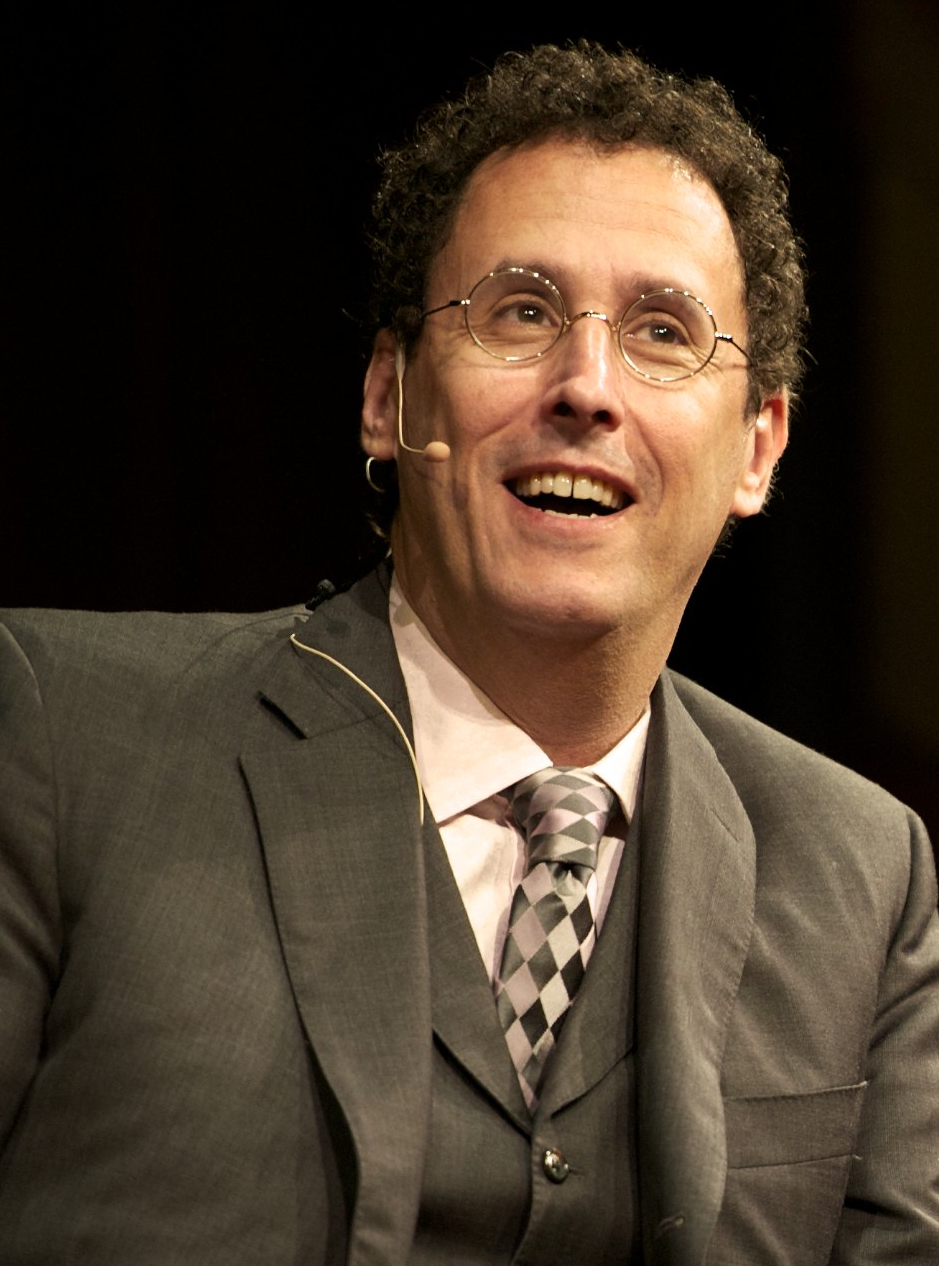
- Kushner in 2010
Awards and nominations
Award	Wins	Nominations
Academy Awards	0	4
BAFTA Awards	0	2
Emmy Awards	1	1
Golden Globes	0	2
Grammy Awards	0	1
Olivier Awards	1	3
Tony Awards	2	4

Totals (Note: Certain award groups do not simply award one winner. They acknowledge several different recipients, have runners-up, and have third place. Since this is a specific recognition and is different from losing an award, runner-up mentions are considered wins in this award tally. For simplification and to avoid errors, each award in this list has been presumed to have had a prior nomination.)
- Wins: 11
- Nominations: 68

Tony Kushner is an American playwright and screenwriter. Kushner is known for his stage work on Broadway and his film collaborations with Steven Spielberg. He has received several accolades including a Primetime Emmy Award, a Laurence Olivier Award, and two Tony Awards as well as nominations for four Academy Awards, two British Academy Film Awards, two Golden Globe Awards, and a Grammy Award. Kushner is also the recipient of various honorary awards including the National Medal of Arts from President Barack Obama in 2013.

Kushner has been lauded for his work on stage, most notably known for his seminal work, the two-part American epic play Angels in America, about the AIDs crisis in New York City during the 1980s. The play's first part, Angels in America: Millennium Approaches debuted on Broadway in 1993 and its second part Angels in America: Perestroika debuted in 1994. Both parts earned individual consecutive Tony Awards for Best Play and Kushner earned the Pulitzer Prize for Drama. The play also ran in London's West End earning nominations for the Laurence Olivier Award for Best New Play. Kushner adapted his play Angels in America for television, into a HBO six part limited series of the same name directed by Mike Nichols in 2003 earning the Humanitas Prize, the Primetime Emmy Award, the Writers Guild Award of America.

Kushner also wrote the book for the musical Caroline, or Change which made its Broadway debut in 2004 earning two Tony Award nominations for Best Book of a Musical and Best Original Score. The musical ran in London earning the Laurence Olivier Award for Best New Musical in 2007. Kushner was nominated for the Grammy Award for Best Musical Theater Album at the 65th Annual Grammy Awards.

On film, Kushner has collaborated with director Steven Spielberg, writing four of his films. Their first collaboration was the historical action drama Munich which he co–wrote with Eric Roth. The two earned nominations for the Academy Award for Best Adapted Screenplay and the Golden Globe Award for Best Screenplay. Kushner then adapted the Doris Kearns Goodwin historical novel Team of Rivals into the Spielberg historical drama Lincoln (2012), earning the Paul Selvin Award and the Critics' Choice Movie Award for Best Adapted Screenplay as well as nominations for the Academy Award, BAFTA Award, Golden Globe Award, and Writers Guild of America for Best Screenplay.

Kushner earned acclaim for adapted the 1961 musical West Side Story for Spielberg into the 2021 musical of the same name earning nominations for the Critics' Choice Award and the Writers Guild of America Award. Kushner served as a producer on the Spielberg's semi-autographical coming-of-age film The Fabelmans (2022) for which they were nominated for the Academy Award, BAFTA Award, Golden Globe Award and Critics' Choice Movie Award for their screenplay. The film won the Golden Globe Award for Best Motion Picture - Drama.

== Major associations ==
=== Academy Awards ===
Year	Category	Nominated work	Result	Ref.
2005	Best Adapted Screenplay	Munich	Nominated	
2012	Best Adapted Screenplay	Lincoln	Nominated	
2022	Best Picture	The Fabelmans	Nominated	
2022	Best Original Screenplay	The Fabelmans	Nominated	

=== BAFTA Awards ===
Year	Category	Nominated work	Result	Ref.
British Academy Film Awards
2012	Best Adapted Screenplay	Lincoln	Nominated	
2022	Best Original Screenplay	The Fabelmans	Nominated	

=== Emmy Awards ===
Year	Category	Nominated work	Result	Ref.
Primetime Emmy Award
2004	Outstanding Writing for a Miniseries, or Movie	Angels in America	Won	

=== Golden Globe Awards ===
Year	Category	Nominated work	Result	Ref.
2005	Best Screenplay	Munich	Nominated	
2012	Best Screenplay	Lincoln	Nominated	
2022	Best Screenplay	The Fabelmans	Nominated	

=== Grammy Awards ===
Year	Category	Nominated work	Result	Ref.
2023	Best Musical Theatre Album	Caroline, Or Change	Nominated	

=== Laurence Olivier Awards ===
Year	Category	Nominated work	Result	Ref.
1992	Best New Play	Angels in America	Nominated	
1994	Best New Play	Angels in America: Perestroika	Nominated	
2007	Best New Musical	Caroline, or Change	Won	

=== Tony Awards ===
Year	Category	Nominated work	Result	Ref.
1993	Best Play	Angels in America: Millennium Approaches	Won	
1994	Best Play	Angels in America: Perestroika	Won	
2004	Best Book of a Musical	Caroline, or Change	Nominated	
2004	Best Original Score	Caroline, or Change	Nominated	

== Miscellaneous ==
Organizations	Year	Category	Work	Result	Ref.
Critics' Choice Awards	2012	Best Adapted Screenplay	Lincoln	Won	
Critics' Choice Awards	2021	Best Adapted Screenplay	West Side Story	Nominated	
Critics' Choice Awards	2022	Best Original Screenplay	The Fabelmans	Nominated	
Drama Desk Award	1993	Outstanding Play	Angels in America: Millennium Approaches	Won	
Drama Desk Award	1994	Outstanding Play	Angels in America: Perestroika	Won	
Drama Desk Award	2004	Outstanding Book of a Musical	Caroline, or Change	Nominated	
Pulitzer Prize	1993	Pulitzer Prize for Drama	Angels in America: Millennium Approaches	Won	
Writers Guild of America Award	2005	Long Form - Adapted	Angels in America	Won	
Writers Guild of America Award	2012	Best Adapted Screenplay	Lincoln	Nominated	
Writers Guild of America Award	2012	Paul Selvin Award		Honored	
Writers Guild of America Award	2021	Best Adapted Screenplay	West Side Story	Nominated	
Writers Guild of America Award	2022	Best Original Screenplay	The Fabelmans	Nominated	

== Honorary awards ==
Organizations	Year	Award	Result	Ref.
Whiting Foundation	1990	Whiting Award	Honored	
PEN/Laura Pels International Foundation	2002	Theater Award	Honored	
National Foundation of Jewish Culture	2004	Cultural Achievement Award	Honored	
American Academy of Arts and Letters	2005	Member	Honored	
Steinberg Prize	2008	Distinguished Playwright	Honored	
Puffin/Nation Prize	2011	Creative Citizenship	Honored	
Saint Louis University	2012	St. Louis Literary Award	Honored	
Writers Guild of America	2012	Paul Selvin Award	Honored	
American Philosophical Society	2013	Elected Member	Honored	
The Lincoln Forum	2013	Richard Nelson Current Achievement Award	Honored	
