= E. H. Hurst =

American politician (1908–1990)

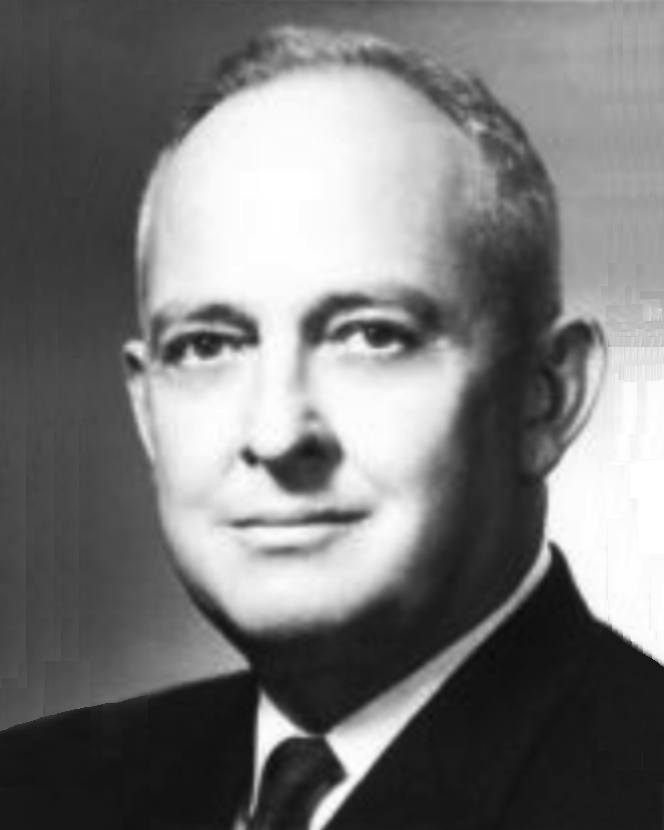
- Official portrait, 1960

Member of the Mississippi House of Representatives from Amite County
- In office 1960–1964 Serving with Britte Hughey
- Preceded by: Frank Wall
- Succeeded by: Frank Wall

Personal details
- Born: Eugene Hunter Hurst Jr. October 21, 1908 Liberty, Mississippi, U.S.
- Died: April 20, 1990 (aged 81) Magnolia, Mississippi, U.S.
- Party: Democratic
- Spouse: Jimmie Lou Cain (m. 1934)
- Children: 5

Eugene Hunter Hurst Jr. (October 21, 1908 – April 20, 1990) was a dairy farmer and a politician from Amite County, Mississippi. Elected as a Democrat to the Mississippi House of Representatives for a single term in 1959, Hurst supported segregation and opposed the civil rights movement, which had expanded into Amite County by the early 1960s.

Hurst is noted for killing his neighbor and childhood friend Herbert Lee, an African American activist who was working to register black voters in Amite County. While serving as an active state representative, Hurst fatally shot Lee in public on September 25, 1961. Despite considerable evidence indicating that Hurst was the aggressor, he was found to have acted in self-defense by an all-white jury at an inquest held the same day and never charged with a crime. At least one witness to the shooting was subsequently killed as well, in an apparent campaign of witness intimidation. Nevertheless, Hurst failed to win reelection in 1963 and thereafter retired from politics.

== Early life and background ==
E. H. Hurst was born and raised in Liberty, Mississippi. After graduating from Southwest Mississippi Junior College, he ran a successful dairy and cotton farm in his hometown. He also joined the Democratic Party and engaged in local politics, eventually being elected to the state house in 1959. Hurst supported segregation and the continued exclusion from voting in state elections of African Americans, who had been disfranchised by the 1890 state constitution and subsequent discriminatory practices in voter registration. A member of a white supremacist Citizens' Council in Amite County, Hurst vehemently opposed the civil rights movement, which had begun trying to register African American voters in the South.

== Shooting of Herbert Lee and aftermath ==
Hurst gained statewide attention for his fatal shooting of Herbert Lee, an African American voting rights activist. Hurst and Lee grew up on neighboring farms and were childhood friends, with Lee often visiting Hurst's farm to play as a boy. This cordial relationship continued into adulthood, with Hurst at one point helping Lee to apply for a farm loan. However, Hurst's attitude towards Lee changed dramatically when Lee began attending voter registration classes conducted by the SNCC and the NAACP, civil rights organizations that had increased their presence in Amite County by the late 1950s. Lee became a charter member of the Amite County branch on the NAACP. By 1961, Lee himself had begun helping to register black voters for upcoming elections. Prior to 1961, Amite County only had a single registered black voter, and that individual had never actually voted. Hurst supported this status quo and strongly opposed any attempts to increase the African American voter count.

On September 25, 1961, in the middle of the day at a Westbrook's gin, a cotton gin near their homes, Hurst fatally shot Lee in extremely controversial circumstances. Both men arrived at the gin around the same time to unload and process some of their cotton crop. Hurst approached Lee and, after a short conversation, shot and killed Lee with a single bullet from a .38 caliber pistol. Lee was 49-years-old and left behind a widow and nine children.

At a coroner's jury held a few hours later, Hurst claimed that Lee had threatened him with a tire iron, and an all-white jury returned a verdict of justifiable homicide on grounds of self-defense. Five witnesses, two white men and three black men, gave testimony in support of Hurst. However, the Amite County courtroom in which the inquest was held was full of armed white men, and witnesses were pressured to testify in Hurst's favor. Hurst was never charged with a crime.

Louis Allen, a black witness to the shooting, initially testified in support of Hurst's self-defense claim. Allen later discussed the case with SNCC civil rights activists including Julian Bond and reconsidered his testimony, believing that Hurst was the aggressor and had in fact murdered Lee. Learning that a federal jury was considering charges against Hurst, Allen met with representatives of the FBI and Civil Rights Commission to see if federal protection would be available were he to change his testimony to the truth. When the Justice Department told him they would not offer him protection, Allen, afraid he would be killed, decided to stick to his original version of events. The white community nonetheless heard that Allen had talked to the government, and he was threatened, fired from his job, and harassed by law enforcement. In January 1964, the night before he was planning to move away from Liberty, Allen was murdered in his driveway by two shotgun blasts. Hurst's role in the Allen murder remains unclear. Investigations since 1994 have suggested that Allen was murdered by Daniel Jones, an Amite County deputy sheriff, but no one has been prosecuted for the murder.

=== Aftermath ===
Despite Hurst's killing of Lee, the SNCC and NAACP were still able to register about 1,200 voters in Mississippi against the resistance of officials like Hurst. Adopting a simple registration process that was typical of northern states, and to show the desire of blacks to vote, they organized the Mississippi Freedom Democratic Party, open to all. Sixty thousand blacks joined this party, and elected 68 delegates to go to the 1964 Democratic National Convention in Atlantic City, New Jersey that summer. They challenged the white-only Democratic Party delegates at the credentials committee, as white Democrats in the South had kept most blacks out of politics for more than 60 years. The national party would not accept the MFDP delegates as the official ones for the state.

Medgar Evers, leader of the NAACP in Mississippi, was one of the speakers at Lee's funeral. In June 1963, Evers himself was shot and killed in a planned assassination outside his home in Jackson, Mississippi. Evers' killer, Byron De La Beckwith, was a white supremacist and member of the Ku Klux Klan. Like Hurst, Beckwith initially avoided criminal penalties due to Mississippi's use of all-white juries, although Beckwith was eventually convicted of murder based on new evidence in 1994 (the first trial being a hung jury).

Mississippi reduced the number of state representatives from Amite County to a single seat in 1963. Hurst failed to win reelection, losing his seat to Frank Wall. Activists continually petitioned for Hurst's criminal case to be similarly reopened, but no formal legal action was initiated against him by the time of his death in 1990.

Mississippi House of Representatives
Preceded by Frank T. Wall	Mississippi Representative from Amite County; 1960–1964; Served alongside: Britte Hughey	Succeeded by Frank T. Wall
