= Herbert Lee (activist) =

American civil rights activist

- Born: January 1, 1912; Liberty, Mississippi, U.S.
- Died: September 25, 1961 (aged 49); Liberty, Mississippi, U.S.
- Occupations: Dairy and cotton farmer
- Known for: Murder victim during civil rights movement

Herbert Lee (January 1, 1912 – September 25, 1961) was an American civil rights activist in Mississippi remembered as a proponent of voting rights for African Americans in that state, who had been disenfranchised since 1890. He was a charter member of the National Association for the Advancement of Colored People in Amite County and sought to enfranchise African-Americans by encouraging voter registration.

In 1961, Lee assisted Bob Moses in his efforts to persuade locals to register. His activities were met with threats of reprisal by the white community, and Lee became one of the movement's earliest victims to white violence. He was murdered by Mississippi state representative E. H. Hurst in broad daylight at a cotton gin while delivering cotton near Liberty.

== Personal life ==
Herbert Lee was born in Liberty, Mississippi on January 1, 1912, to Albert Lee, a farmer, and his wife Elvira Turner. Lee lacked a formal education, but his wife, Prince Estella Melson of Helena, Louisiana, taught him how to sign his name. The couple had nine children together. By the 1950s, Lee built his dairy and cotton farms into successful businesses, profitable enough to support his large family.

== Career ==
In 1952, E. W. Steptoe, a fellow farmer and friend of Lee's, organized the Amite County chapter of the National Association for the Advancement of Colored People for the purpose of registering black Americans to vote; Lee became a charter member and attended meetings in a neighboring farmhouse. Mississippi's constitution of 1890 had politically disfranchised black Americans, creating barriers to voter registration such as poll taxes, literacy tests, and grandfather clauses to exclude them from voting. Only one black person was registered in all of Amite County, and he never voted.

When Bob Moses of the Student Nonviolent Coordinating Committee (SNCC) arrived in Amite County in 1961 to organize a voter registration movement, Lee served as a driver for him and other SNCC activists. Upon Moses's arrival in Mississippi, and amid increasing civil rights activity, the white community attempted to deter blacks with threats of reprisal, harassment, and intimidation; in his reports to John Doar of the United States Department of Justice, Moses expressed dire concern for Lee's life.

== Murder ==
Although less visible than Moses or Steptoe, Lee became one of the voting rights movement's earliest victims of white violence. He was transporting cotton to a cotton gin near Liberty on the morning of September 25, 1961, when Mississippi state representative E. H. Hurst confronted him, armed with a pistol. In the presence of several witnesses, Hurst killed Lee in cold blood with a single gunshot to the head.

Hurst later claimed self-defense to a coroner's jury—saying that, in an argument over debts, Lee had attacked him with a tire iron, and his gun had fired in the ensuing skirmish. Among those forced to confirm his story in a courtroom filled with armed white men was Louis Allen because he feared for his life. An all-white jury ruled that the killing was a justifiable homicide. In 1964, Allen was killed after informing federal investigators of his forced testimony.

Those who were aware of Lee's voting rights activities knew he was targeted in this killing. Ten days after his death, 115 black high school students marched through McComb, Mississippi, in protest of his murder. Lee's death brought the SNCC's voter registration movement in the county to a close. Unable to guarantee activists' safety, Moses left the county in 1962. Later the cotton gin was renovated for use as a restaurant. In 2010, the owner of the Cotton Gin Restaurant erected a historical marker at the spot where Lee was killed.
