= T. F. Badon =

American lawyer and politician

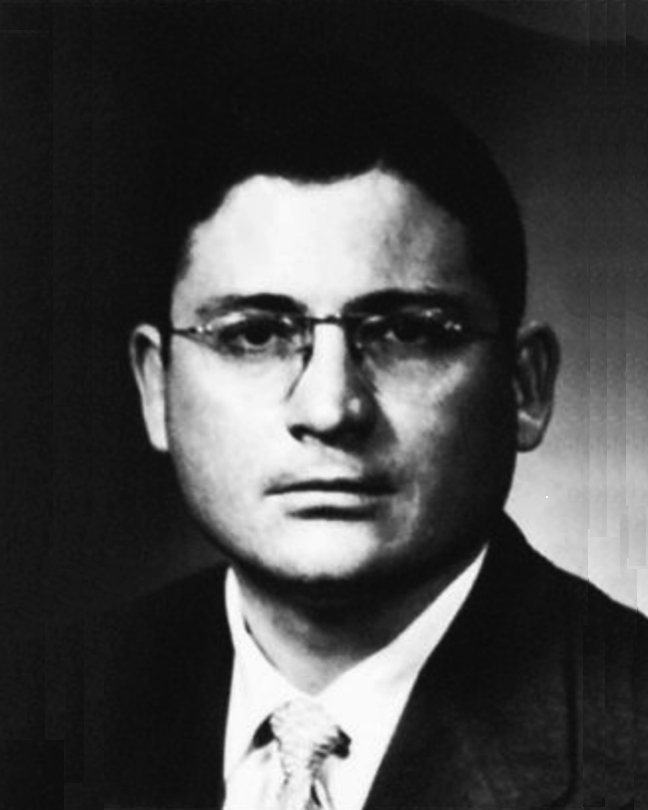

Member of the Mississippi House of Representatives from Amite County
- In office 1952–1956 Serving with Frank Wall
- Preceded by: Ivy C. Butler
- Succeeded by: Britte Hughey

Personal details
- Born: Thomas Ford Badon; December 3, 1922 Smithdale, Mississippi, U.S.
- Died: May 21, 2015 (aged 92) Liberty, Mississippi, U.S.
- Party: Democratic
- Spouse: Betty Willoughby (m. 1959)
- Education: University of Mississippi

Thomas Ford Badon (December 3, 1922 – May 21, 2015) was an American lawyer and politician who served in the Mississippi House of Representatives and as a town alderman in Liberty, Mississippi.

Mississippi House of Representatives
Preceded by Ivy C. Butler	Mississippi Representative from Amite County; 1952–1956; Served alongside: Frank Wall	Succeeded by Britte Hughey
