= Louis Allen =

American businessman and murder victim

- Born: April 25, 1919; Amite County, Mississippi U.S.
- Died: January 31, 1964 (aged 44); Amite County, Mississippi U.S.
- Cause of death: Murder
- Occupation: Businessman

Louis Allen (April 25, 1919 – January 31, 1964) was an African-American logger in Liberty, Mississippi, who was shot and killed on his land during the civil rights era. He had previously tried to register to vote and had allegedly talked to federal officials after witnessing the 1961 murder of Herbert Lee, an NAACP member, by E. H. Hurst, a white state legislator. Civil rights activists had come to Liberty that summer to organize for voter registration, as no African-American had been allowed to vote since the state's disenfranchising constitution was passed in 1890.

Allen was harassed and jailed repeatedly by Amite County Sheriff Daniel Bryant Jones (January 3, 1930 – July 26, 2013). The day before he planned to move out of state, Allen was fatally shot on his property. Since the late 20th century, his case has been investigated by Tulane University history professor Plater Robinson. The case was reopened by the FBI beginning in 2007 as part of its review of civil rights-era cold cases. In 2011 the CBS program 60 Minutes conducted a special on his murder as well. Their work suggested that Allen was killed by Jones. However, no one has been prosecuted for the murder.

== Early life ==
Louis Allen was a native of Amite County, Mississippi, where he was born in 1919. The county's population was majority African-American, with an economy based on agriculture: cotton, dairy farming and logging. Many black people left before World War II because of poor economic opportunities, racial violence, and social oppression under Jim Crow, decreasing the black population by 29% from 1940 to 1960, following earlier declines. More than six million blacks left the Southern United States in the Great Migration to the North, the Midwest, and, beginning in the 1940s, the West Coast.

Allen served in the United States Army during the war; he enlisted at age 23 in the service at Camp Shelby on January 12, 1943. After his return to Mississippi, he worked as a logger and farm laborer. Allen and his wife Elizabeth had four children together, including a daughter and a son named Henry (called Hank). He built up his own logging business, doing well enough also to buy his own land, where he and his family raised produce and cattle.

== Herbert Lee's murder and trial ==
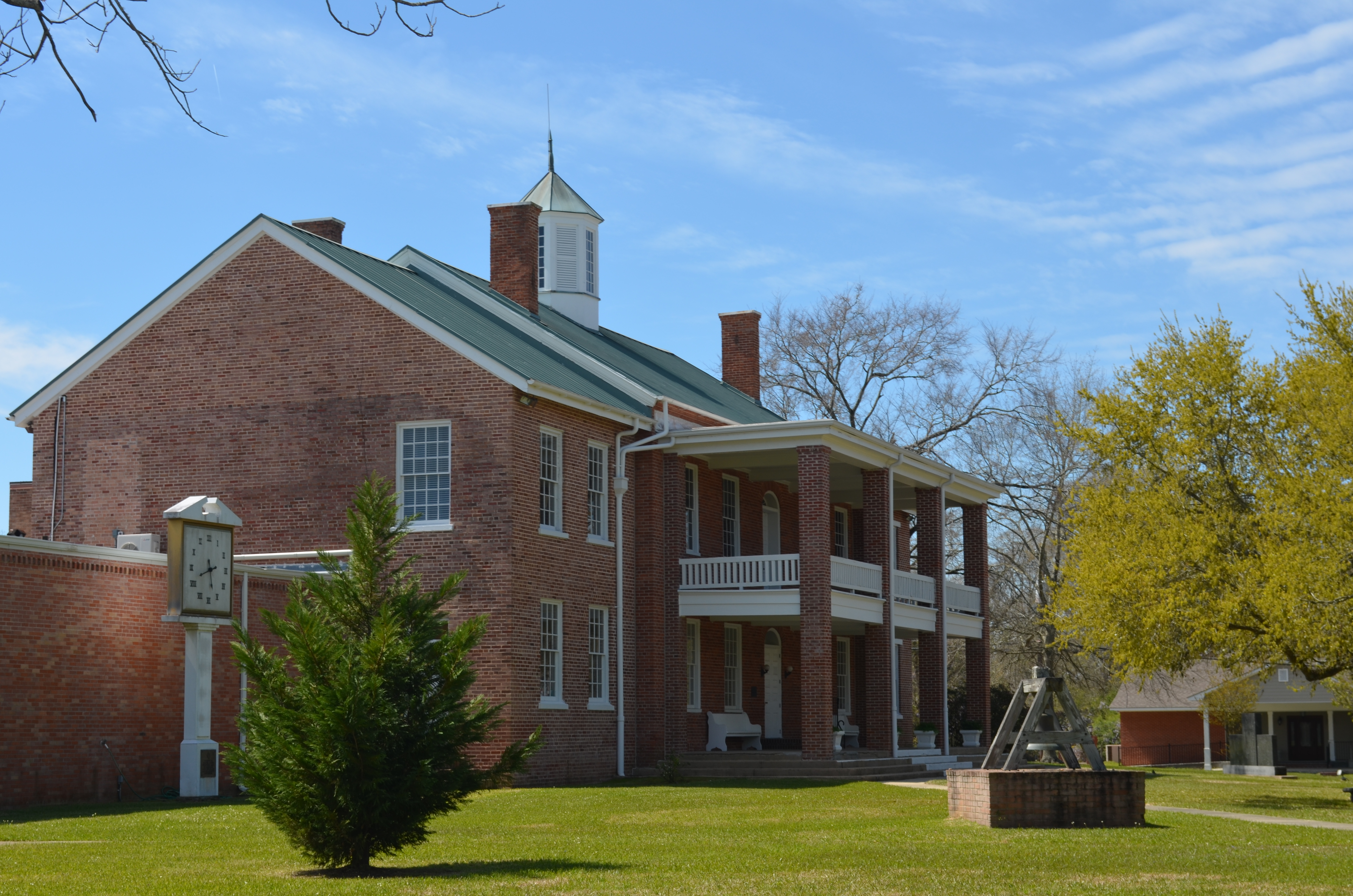
Amite County Courthouse in Liberty, where activists had been beaten and Allen was shot at while trying to register to vote.

Mississippi's state constitution, enacted in 1890, politically disfranchised African-Americans, using provisions such as poll taxes, literacy tests and grandfather clauses to raise barriers to voter registration and exclude blacks from voting. In the early 1960s, a local chapter of the National Association for the Advancement of Colored People (NAACP) was founded by E. W. Steptoe for the purpose of registering black voters. He was soon joined by Bob Moses of the Student Nonviolent Coordinating Committee (SNCC).

On September 25, 1961, a pro-segregation state legislator, E.H. Hurst, shot and killed an NAACP member and SNCC supporter named Herbert Lee at the Westbrook Cotton Gin. Louis Allen and eleven other men witnessed the murder. Hurst's side of the story made the claim that Lee attacked him with a tire iron, causing him to shoot to protect himself. When a coroner's inquest was conducted hours later, in a courtroom filled with white men, Allen and the other witnesses were pressured by the circumstances and by the local authorities into giving false testimony. They supported Hurst's claim of shooting Lee in self-defense, and this incorrect retelling of Lee's murder alongside a piece of iron being "discovered" underneath Lee's body by the same local authorities that coerced the witnesses' testimony led to Hurst being cleared of any wrongdoing. However, Allen later told fellow activists the truth behind Lee's killing. He saw that Hurst approached Lee, who had driven up in his truck, and after a limited amount of discussion, Hurst aimed and shot his pistol at an unarmed Lee. He also discussed the incident with Julian Bond, who encouraged him to tell his story to the FBI. Bond was aware that, in the racially charged atmosphere of Amite County, Allen was at high personal risk if it became known that he had talked to the Bureau. Interviewed in 2011, Bond said:

"He lied [at Hurst's inquest] because he was in fear of his life...If he had implicated a powerful white man in a murder of a black man, he was risking his life...I tried to encourage him to tell the truth, but you know, it was like saying, 'Why don't you volunteer to be killed?'"

Learning that a federal jury was to consider charges against Hurst, Allen talked to the FBI and the United States Commission on Civil Rights in Jackson, asking for protection if he testified. An FBI memo reported that Allen "expressed fear that he might be killed", but the Justice Department said it could not give him protection. Allen chose to repeat the official version of events which exonerated Hurst.

== Harassment and murder ==
Although Allen had not cooperated with the Justice Department, rumors of his visit in Jackson quickly spread among Liberty's white community. Local whites shunned Allen and cut off customers for his logging business. In August 1962, as Allen and two other black men tried to register to vote at Amite County Courthouse, they were shot at by an unknown assailant. (No black person had been allowed to vote in Amite County since 1890.) Following this incident, a white businessman threatened Allen, saying, "Louis, the best thing you can do is leave. Your little family—they're innocent people—and your house could get burned down. All of you could get killed."

When Allen reported the death threats, the FBI – which had limited jurisdiction over civil rights cases at the time – referred the matter to Sheriff Jones's office. The FBI did so despite an agent acknowledging in a 1961 memo that, "Allen was to be killed and the local sheriff was involved in the plot to kill him." Allen then allegedly became a target of harassment by Jones. In a later interview, Hank Allen described Jones as "mean", recounting how he arrested his father on trumped-up charges and beat him outside his home. On one such occasion in September 1962, Jones broke Allen's jaw with a flashlight. Moses wrote to Assistant Attorney General John Doar about Allen, making reference to "a plot by the sheriff and seven other men." Jones' father was a high-ranking Exalted Cyclops in Liberty's chapter of the Ku Klux Klan. FBI documentation from the 1960s claimed that Jones was also a Klan member.

When Allen was released from jail, he filed an assault complaint with the FBI against Jones. He summarily testified before an all-white federal grand jury; as blacks had been prevented from registering and voting, they could not serve on juries. The jury dismissed his complaint. Allen stayed in Liberty because he was caring for his elderly parents. Among his associates was Leo McKnight, who had worked with him and twice tried registering to vote with him. In February 1963, McKnight and his family died in a suspicious fire that local blacks believed was a murder. In November 1963, Jones arrested Allen again, falsely charging him with bouncing a check and having a concealed weapon. Law enforcement officials threatened Allen with three to five years in prison; after three weeks, the NAACP raised the bail for Allen.

In January 1964, after his mother died, Allen arranged to leave Liberty and move in with his brother in Milwaukee, Wisconsin, as he feared for his life. On January 31, the night before his planned departure, Allen was ambushed at the cattle grid at the border of his property. He was killed by two shotgun blasts to the head. His body was found by his son Hank. Hank disclosed in a 2011 interview that Jones told Hank's mother, Allen's widow, that “If Louis had just shut his mouth, he wouldn’t be layin’ there on the ground."

Allen's death is mentioned in the first memoir of civil rights activist Anne Moody titled Coming of Age in Mississippi. When Moody writes about reasons she should stay away from her family, she mentions Allen's murder.

== Investigations ==
No thorough investigation into Allen's murder was conducted until 1994. That year, Plater Robinson, a history professor at Tulane University, began examining the case files. Robinson's research in the following years pointed to Jones as a likely suspect in the killing. In 1998, Robinson conducted a tape-recorded interview with Rev. Alfred Knox Sr., an elderly black preacher in Liberty, who reported that Jones had recruited his son-in-law, Archie Lee Weatherspoon, to kill Louis Allen. When Weatherspoon refused Jones' request to pull the trigger, Jones allegedly killed Allen himself.

In 2007, the FBI reopened Allen's case as one of a number of civil rights-era cold cases it was examining. Its staff identified Jones as the prime suspect. As of 2011, the FBI has been unable to collect enough evidence to prosecute. In April 2011, the CBS newsmagazine 60 Minutes broadcast a report about the Allen case. Correspondent Steve Kroft had traveled to Liberty to interview local residents and was largely met with silence. Kroft interviewed Jones on his property; the elderly man denied killing Allen, but he declined to answer when asked about his alleged Klan membership.

== Legacy and honors ==
- Bertha Gober's song, "We'll Never Turn Back," memorialized Lee's murder.
- Lee's son, Herbert Lee, Jr., became active at age 15 in the civil rights movement in 1965.
- The Westbrook Cotton Gin was added to the National Register of Historic Places in 2010. Its significance was in part as the site of Lee's murder during the Civil Rights era by a white man who was never punished.

== See also ==
- Civil Rights Memorial
- Isaac Woodard
- Emmett Till
- List of unsolved murders (1900–1979)
