= Frank Wall (American politician) =

American politician

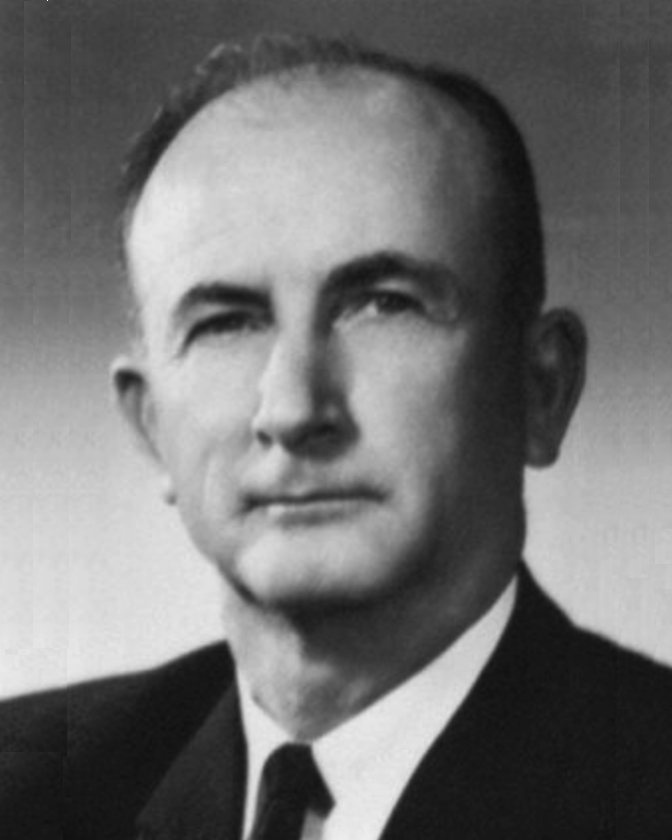

Member of the Mississippi House of Representatives from Amite County
- In office 1964–1968
- Preceded by: E. H. Hurst
- Succeeded by: Homer L. Smith
- In office 1952–1960
- Preceded by: Kenneth Stewart
- Succeeded by: E. H. Hurst

Personal details
- Born: Frank Tracy Wall; March 5, 1908 Gillsburg, Mississippi, U.S.
- Died: March 25, 1998 (aged 90) McComb, Mississippi, U.S.
- Party: Democratic
- Spouse: Margaret Umberger (m. 1931)

Frank Tracy Wall (March 5, 1908 – March 25, 1998) was an American dairy farmer and politician who served in the Mississippi House of Representatives. Elected three times from Amite County, he was a member of the local Farm Bureau and Citizens' Council, a white supremacist organization.

== Election history ==
Wall was elected in 1951 and 1955 alongside T. F. Badon and Britte Hughey, respectively, and was succeeded by Hughey and E. H. Hurst. In 1963, Amite was apportioned only one seat in the House, and Wall successfully challenged Hughey for the Democratic nomination.

Mississippi House of Representatives
Preceded by Kenneth Stewart; E. H. Hurst	Mississippi Representative from Amite County; 1952–1960; 1964–1968; Served alongside: T. F. Badon; Britte Hughey	Succeeded by E. H. Hurst; Homer L. Smith
