= Tony Kushner =

American playwright and screenwriter (born 1956)

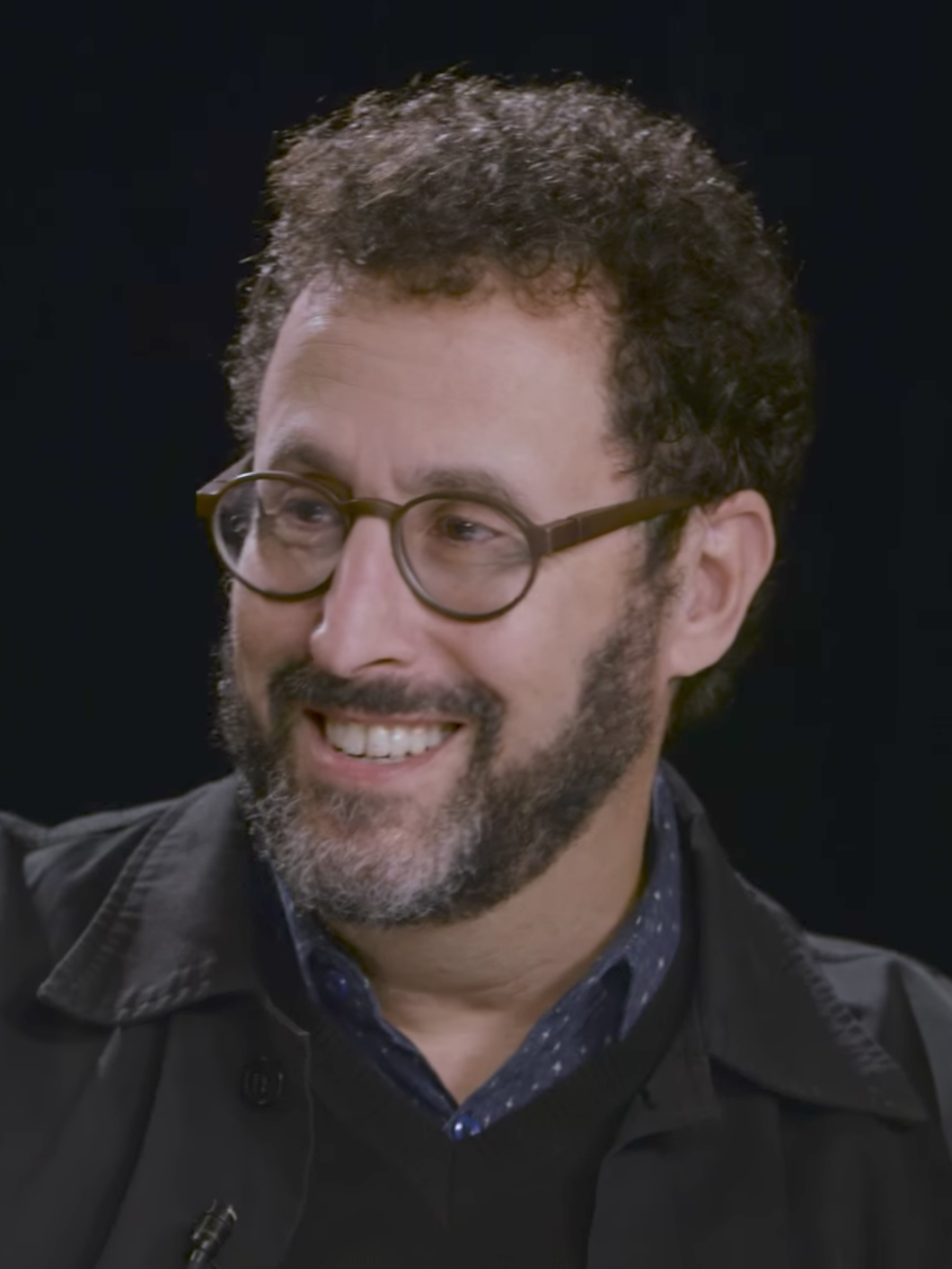
- Kushner in 2016
- Born: July 16, 1956 (age 70); New York City, U.S.
- Education: Columbia University (BA); New York University (MFA)
- Occupations: Playwright; author; screenwriter
- Spouse: Mark Harris (m. 2008)
- Writing career
- Notable awards: Full list

Anthony Robert Kushner (born July 16, 1956) is an American author, playwright, and screenwriter. Among his stage work, he is most known for Angels in America, which earned a Pulitzer Prize and a Tony Award, as well as its subsequent acclaimed HBO miniseries of the same name. At the turn of the 21st century, he became known for his numerous film collaborations with Steven Spielberg. He received the National Medal of Arts from President Barack Obama in 2013. Kushner is among the few writers in history nominated for an Emmy, Grammy, Oscar, and Tony Award.

Kushner made his Broadway debut in 1993 with both Angels in America: Millennium Approaches and Angels in America: Perestroika. He received the Pulitzer Prize for Drama and the Tony Award for Best Play. His 2003 television adaptation of the play earned him the Primetime Emmy Award for Outstanding Writing for a Limited Series or Movie.

In 2003, Kushner wrote the lyrics and book to the musical Caroline, or Change which earned him Tony Award nominations for Best Book of a Musical and Best Original Score. The 2021 Broadway revival of Caroline, or Change earned Kushner a nomination for the Grammy Award for Best Musical Theater Album.

His film work with Spielberg includes Munich (2005), Lincoln (2012), West Side Story (2021), and The Fabelmans (2022). His work with Spielberg has earned him four Academy Award nominations, one for Best Picture, two for Best Adapted Screenplay, and one for Best Original Screenplay.

== Early life and education ==
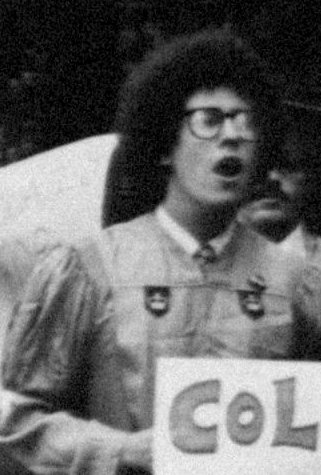
Kushner protesting at Columbia University in 1978

Kushner was born in Manhattan, the son of Sylvia (née Deutscher), a bassoonist, and William David Kushner, a clarinetist and conductor. His family is Jewish, descended from immigrants from Russia and Poland. Shortly after his birth, Kushner's parents moved to Lake Charles, Louisiana, the seat of Calcasieu Parish where he spent his childhood. During high school Kushner was active in policy debate. He first developed an interest in the figure of Roy Cohn—who features as a major character in his play Angels in America—when he was ten years old, after asking his father about the meaning of McCarthyism, to which his father responded by giving his son a copy of Fred J. Cook’s The Nightmare Decade.^{Video on YouTube}

In 1974, Kushner moved back to New York to begin his undergraduate college education at Columbia University, where he received a Bachelor of Arts degree in Medieval studies in 1978. He attended the Tisch School of the Arts at NYU, graduating in 1984. During graduate school, he spent the summers of 1978–1981 directing both early original works (Masque of the Owls and Incidents and Occurrences During the Travels of the Tailor Max) and plays by Shakespeare (A Midsummer Night's Dream and The Tempest) starring the children attending the Governor's Program for Gifted Children (GPGC) in Lake Charles.

Kushner has received several honorary degrees: in 2003 from Columbia College Chicago, in 2006 an honorary doctorate from Brandeis University, in 2008 an honorary Doctor of Letters from SUNY Purchase College, in May 2011 an honorary doctorate from CUNY's John Jay College of Criminal Justice and also an Honorary Doctorate from The New School, and in May 2015, an honorary Doctor of Letters from Ithaca College.

== Career ==
As a student at NYU, Kushner cofounded the theatre company 3P Productions (short for "Politics, Poetry, and Popcorn") for which he wrote and directed plays such as the dance-theatre piece La Fin de la Baleine: An Opera for the Apocalypse. In 1985, he received a yearlong National Endowment for the Arts directing fellowship at the St. Louis Repertory Theater. His first commercially produced play was A Bright Room Called Day, which premiered at San Francisco's Eureka Theatre Company in 1987. The company subsequently commissioned a play from Kushner, which along with a $50,000 National Endowment for the Arts grant, spawned Kushner's best known work, Angels in America. A play in two parts (Millennium Approaches and Perestroika), Angels in America is a seven-hour epic about the AIDS epidemic in Reagan-era New York. It had its world premiere at the Eureka Theatre in 1991, followed by productions at the Royal National Theatre, the Mark Taper Forum, and the Walter Kerr Theatre on Broadway. Millennium Approaches won the Pulitzer Prize for Drama, and both parts of the play won consecutive Tony Awards for Best Play in 1993 and 1994.

Kushner's later plays include Slavs!: Thinking About the Longstanding Problems of Virtue and Happiness and Homebody/Kabul. He wrote the book for the musical Caroline, or Change, which premiered on Broadway in 2004. His new translation of Bertolt Brecht's Mother Courage and Her Children was performed at the Delacorte Theater in the summer of 2006, starring Meryl Streep and directed by George C. Wolfe. Kushner has also adapted Brecht's The Good Person of Szechwan, Pierre Corneille's The Illusion, and S. Ansky's play The Dybbuk.

Kushner is famous for frequent revisions and years-long gestations of his plays. Both Angels in America: Perestroika and Homebody/Kabul were significantly revised even after they were first published. Kushner has admitted that the original script version of Angels in America: Perestroika is nearly double the length of the theatrical version. His newest completed play, The Intelligent Homosexual's Guide to Capitalism and Socialism with a Key to the Scriptures, began as a novel more than a decade before it finally opened on May 15, 2009.

In the early 2000s, Kushner began writing for film and television. He wrote the screenplay for a HBO miniseries adaptation of Angels in America directed by Mike Nichols, for which Kushner won a Primetime Emmy Award. His screenplay Munich (co-written with Eric Roth) was produced and directed by Steven Spielberg in 2005. In January 2006, a documentary feature about Kushner titled Wrestling with Angels debuted at the Sundance Film Festival. The film was directed by Freida Lee Mock. In April 2011 it was announced that he would collaborate with Spielberg again, writing the screenplay for an adaptation of historian Doris Kearns Goodwin's book Team of Rivals: The Political Genius of Abraham Lincoln. The screenplay for Lincoln would go on to receive multiple awards, in addition to nominations for Best Adapted Screenplay at the Golden Globes and Academy Awards.

In a 2015 interview actress/producer Viola Davis revealed she had hired Kushner to write an as yet untitled biopic about the life of Barbara Jordan that she planned to star in. In 2016, Kushner worked on a screenplay version of August Wilson's play Fences; the resulting film, directed by Denzel Washington, was released in December 2016. Though his work as a writer was ultimately uncredited, Kushner served as co-producer on the film.

In 2018, it was announced that Kushner was working on a script of a remake of West Side Story for Spielberg to direct. West Side Story was released in December 2021 to positive reviews and received seven Academy Award nominations including Best Picture. In 2022, Kushner collaborated again with Spielberg on The Fabelmans, a fictionalized account of Spielberg's childhood. The film premiered at the 2022 Toronto International Film Festival to widespread critical acclaim and won the festival's People's Choice Award. The Fabelmans received seven Academy Award nominations including Best Picture and Best Original Screenplay.

In 2023, with his Grammy Award nomination for Best Musical Theater Album for Caroline, or Change, Kushner became one of the few writers in history nominated for all four major American entertainment awards: the Emmy, Grammy, Oscar, and Tony Awards.

== Beliefs and activism ==
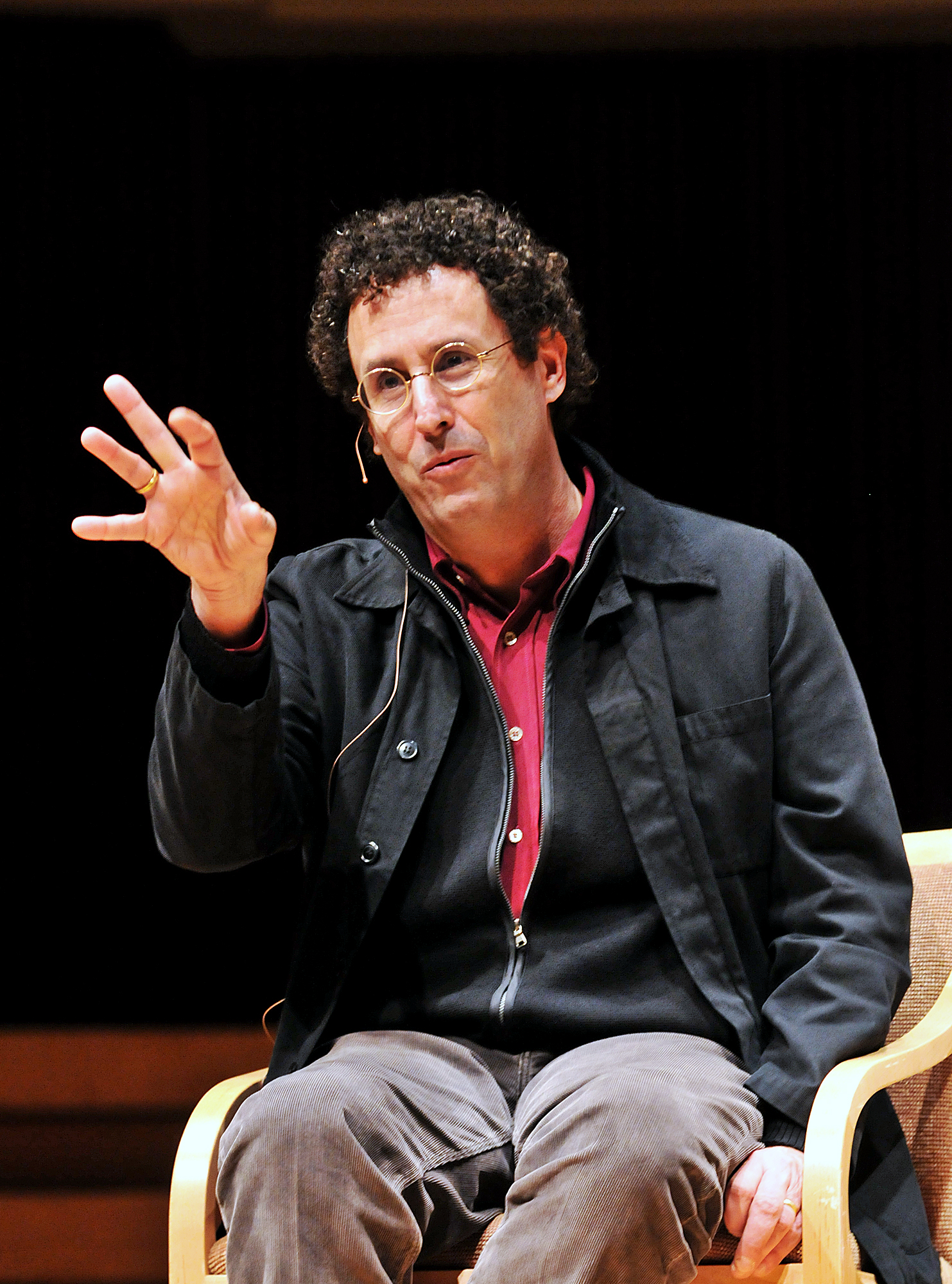
Kushner speaking at the University of Maryland in 2011

Kushner's six-word memoir was "At least I never voted Republican." His criticism of the Israeli government's treatment of Palestinians and the increased religious extremism in Israeli politics and culture has created some controversy with American Jews, including some opposition to his receiving an honorary doctorate at the 2006 commencement of Brandeis University. During the controversy, quotes critical of Zionism and Israel made by Kushner were circulated. Kushner said at the time that his quotes were "grossly mischaracterized". Kushner told the Jewish Advocate in an interview, "All that anybody seems to be reading is a couple of right-wing Web sites taking things deliberately out of context and excluding anything that would complicate the picture by making me seem like a reasonable person, which I basically think I am."

In an interview with the Jewish Independent, Kushner commented, "I want the state of Israel to continue to exist. I've always said that. I've never said anything else. My positions have been lied about and misrepresented in so many ways. People claim that I'm for a one-state solution, which is not true." He later stated that he hopes that "there might be a merging of the two countries because [they're] geographically kind of ridiculous looking on a map", although he acknowledged that political realities make this unlikely in the near future. Kushner has received backlash from family members due to his political views of Israel.

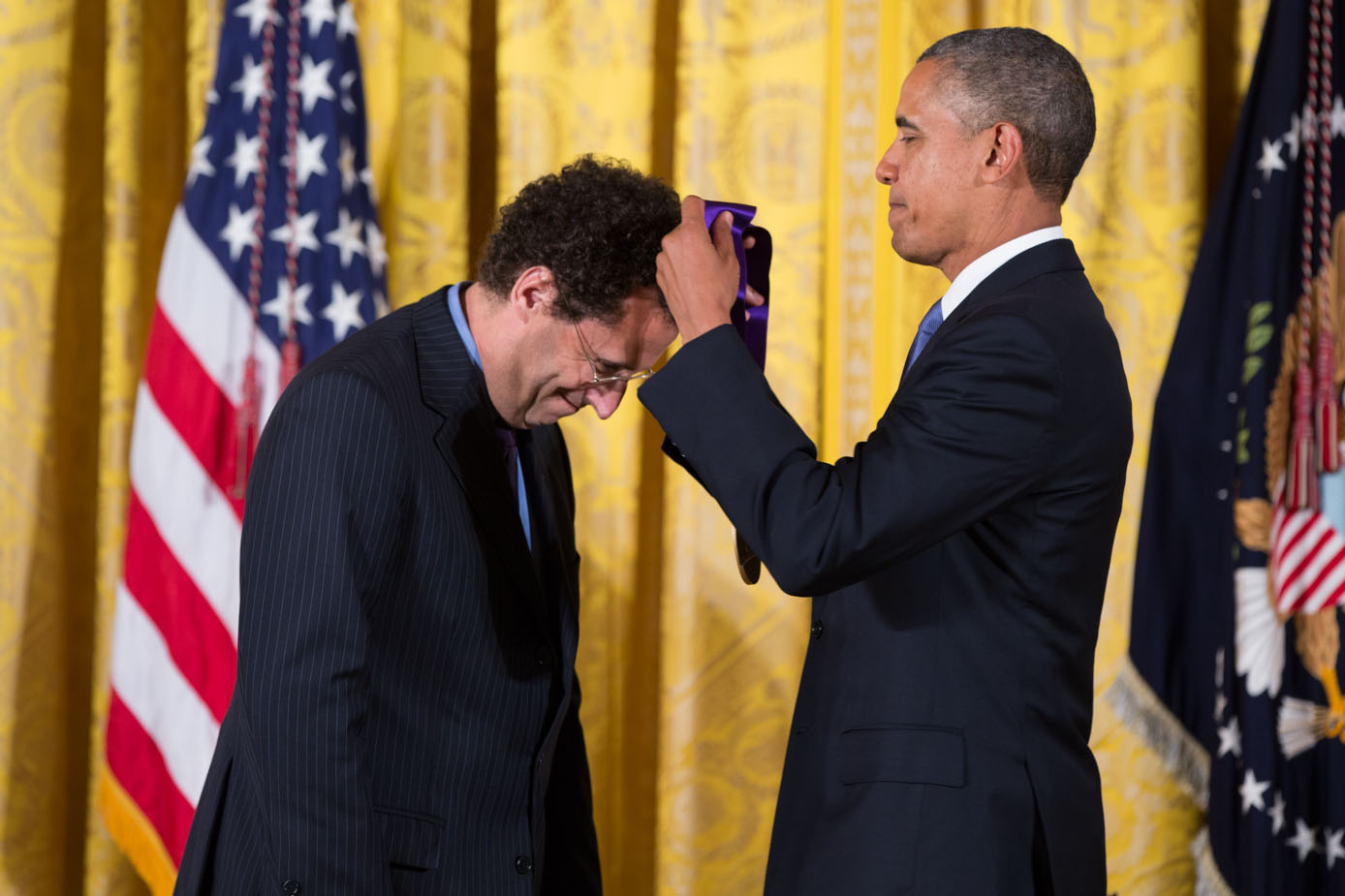
Kushner receiving a National Medal of Arts from President Barack Obama, 2013

On May 2, 2011, the Board of Trustees of the City University of New York (CUNY), at their monthly public meeting, voted to remove (by tabling to avoid debate) Kushner's name from the list of people invited to receive honorary degrees, based on a statement by trustee Jeffrey S. Wiesenfeld about Kushner's purported statements and beliefs about Zionism and Israel. In response, the CUNY Graduate Center Advocate began a live blog on the "Kushner Crisis" situation, including news coverage and statements of support from faculty and academics. Three days later, CUNY issued a public statement that the Board is independent.

On May 6, three previous honorees stated they intended to return their degrees: Barbara Ehrenreich, Michael Cunningham, and Ellen Schrecker. Wiesenfeld said that if Kushner would renounce his anti-Israel statements in front of the Board, he would be willing to vote for him. The same day, the Board moved to reverse its decision. Kushner accepted the honorary doctorate at the June 3 graduation for the John Jay College of Criminal Justice.

In March 2024, Kushner was one of several signatories of "A Statement From Jewish Americans Opposing AIPAC", a letter denouncing AIPAC's lobbying efforts in the United States government.

In September 2026, Kushner attended a protest ahead of a speech by Israeli prime minister Benjamin Netanyahu at the United Nations General Assembly.

== Personal life ==
Kushner and his partner, Mark Harris, held a commitment ceremony in April 2003, the first same-sex commitment ceremony to be featured in the Vows column of The New York Times. In summer 2008, Kushner and Harris were legally married at the town hall in Provincetown, Massachusetts.

He is close friends with theatre director Michael Mayer, whom he met while studying at NYU.

== Credits ==
=== Plays ===
- "Incidents and Occurrences During the Travels of the Tailor Max," Lake Charles, Louisiana, Governor's Program For Gifted Children, 1980.
- The Age of Assassins, New York, Newfoundland Theatre, 1982.
- La Fin de la Baleine: An Opera for the Apocalypse, New York, Ohio Theatre, 1983.
- The Heavenly Theatre, produced at New York University, Tisch School of the Arts, 1984.
- The Umbrella Oracle, Martha's Vineyard, The Yard, Inc..
- Last Gasp at the Cataract, Martha's Vineyard, The Yard, Inc., 1984.
- Yes, Yes, No, No: The Solace-of-Solstice, Apogee/Perigee, Bestial/Celestial Holiday Show, produced in St. Louis, Imaginary Theatre Company, Repertory Theatre of St. Louis, 1985, published in Plays in Process, 1987.
- Stella (adapted from the play by Johann Wolfgang von Goethe), produced in New York City, 1987.
- A Bright Room Called Day, first produced in New York, Theatre 22, April 1985. Published in Plays By Tony Kushner, Broadway Play Publishing Inc.
- In Great Eliza's Golden Time, produced in St. Louis, Missouri, Imaginary Theatre Company, Repertory Theatre of St. Louis, 1986.
- Hydriotaphia, produced in New York City, 1987 (based on the life on Sir Thomas Browne)
- The Illusion (adapted from Pierre Corneille's play L'illusion comique; produced in New York City, 1988, revised version produced in Hartford, CT, 1990), Broadway Play Publishing Inc., 1991.
- In That Day (Lives of the Prophets), New York University, Tisch School of the Arts, 1989.
- Widows (with Ariel Dorfman, adapted from a book by Dorfman), produced in Los Angeles, CA, 1991.
- Angels in America: A Gay Fantasia on National Themes, Part One: Millennium Approaches (produced in San Francisco, 1991), Hern, 1992.
- Angels in America: A Gay Fantasia on National Themes, Part Two: Perestroika, produced in New York City, 1992.
- Angels in America: A Gay Fantasia on National Themes (includes both parts), Theatre Communications Group (New York, NY), 1995.
- Slavs!: Thinking About the Longstanding Problems of Virtue and Happiness, Theatre Communications Group, 1995 & acting edition, Broadway Play Publishing Inc.
- Reverse Transcription: Six Playwrights Bury a Seventh, A Ten-Minute Play That's Nearly Twenty Minutes Long, Louisville, Humana Festival of New American Plays, Actors Theatre of Louisville, March 1996.
- A Dybbuk, or Between Two Worlds (adapted from Joachim Neugroschel's translation of the original Yiddish play The Dybbuk by S. Ansky; produced in New York City at the Joseph Papp Public Theater, 1997), Theatre Communications Group, 1997.
- The Good Person of Szechuan (adapted from the original play by Bertolt Brecht), Arcade, 1997.
- Love's Fire: Seven New Plays Inspired by Seven Shakespearean Sonnets (with Eric Bogosian and others), Morrow, 1998.
- Terminating, or Lass Meine Schmerzen Nicht Verloren Sein, or Ambivalence, in Love's Fire, Minneapolis, Guthrie Theater Lab, January 7, 1998; New York: Joseph Papp Public Theater, June 19, 1998.
- Henry Box Brown, or the Mirror of Slavery, performed at the National Theatre, London, 1998.
- Homebody/Kabul, first performed in New York City, December 2001.
- Caroline, or Change (musical), first performed in New York at the Joseph Papp Public Theater, 2002.
- Only We Who Guard The Mystery Shall Be Unhappy, 2003.
- Translation with "liberties"—but purportedly "not an adaptation"—of Bertolt Brecht's Mother Courage and Her Children (2006)
- The Intelligent Homosexual's Guide to Capitalism and Socialism with a Key to the Scriptures, Minneapolis, Guthrie Theater, 2009.
- Tiny Kushner, a performance of five shorter plays, premiered at the Guthrie Theater, Minneapolis, 2009

The stage performance rights to most of these plays are licensed by Broadway Play Publishing Inc.

=== Books ===
- A Meditation from Angels in America (1994) Harper, San Francisco, ISBN 0-06-251224-2
- Thinking about the Longstanding Problems of Virtue and Happiness: Essays, a Play, Two Poems, and a Prayer (1995) Theatre Communications Group, New York, NY ISBN 1-55936-100-X
- Howard Cruse (1995), Stuck Rubber Baby, introduction by Kushner, Paradox Press, New York. ISBN 1-4012-2713-9
- David B. Feinberg (1995), Queer and Loathing: Rants and Raves of a Raging AIDS Clone, introduction by Kushner, Penguin, New York. ISBN 0-14-024080-2
- David Wojnarowicz (1996), The Waterfront Journals, edited by Amy Scholder, introduction by Kushner, Grove, New York. ISBN 0-8021-3504-8
- "Three Screeds from Key West: For Larry Kramer", (1997) in We Must Love One Another or Die: The Life and Legacies of Larry Kramer, edited by Lawrence D. Mass, St. Martin's Press, New York, pp. 191–199. ISBN 0-312-22084-7
- Moisés Kaufman (1997), Gross Indecency, afterword by Kushner, Vintage, New York, pp. 135–143. ISBN 0-8222-1649-3
- Plays by Tony Kushner (New York: Broadway Play Publishing, 1999), ISBN 0-88145-102-9. Includes:
  - A Bright Room Called Day (First published 1994)
  - The Illusion, freely adapted from Pierre Corneille's L'Illusion comique
  - Slavs!: Thinking About the Longstanding Problems of Virtue and Happiness
- Death & Taxes: Hydrotaphia, and Other Plays (1998). Theatre Communications Group (New York, NY), ISBN 1-55936-156-5. Includes:
  - Reverse transcription
  - Hydriotaphia: or the Death of Dr. Browne (adaptation of Hydriotaphia, Urn Burial, a fictitious, imaginary account of Sir Thomas Browne's character not based upon fact)
  - G. David Schine in Hell
  - Notes on Akiba
  - Terminating
  - East Coast Ode to Howard Jarvis
- Brundibar, illustrated by Maurice Sendak, Hyperion Books for Children, 2003.
- Peter's Pixie, by Donn Kushner, illustrated by Sylvie Daigneault, introduction by Tony Kushner, Tundra Books, 2003
- The Art of Maurice Sendak: 1980 to the Present, 2003
- Save Your Democratic Citizen Soul!: Rants, Screeds, and Other Public Utterances
- Wrestling with Zion: Progressive Jewish-American Responses to the Israeli-Palestinian Conflict, with Alisa Solomon, Grove, 2003.
- Arthur Miller: Collected Plays 1941–1961, Library of America, 2006 (editor)
- Arthur Miller: Collected Plays 1964–1982, Library of America, 2012 (editor)
- Arthur Miller: Collected Plays 1987–2004, with Stage and Radio Plays of the 1930s & 40s, Library of America, 2015 (editor)

=== Essays ===
- "The Secrets of Angels". The New York Times, March 27, 1994, p. H5.
- "The State of the Theatre". Times Literary Supplement, April 28, 1995, p. 14.
- "The Theater of Utopia". Theater, 26 (1995): 9–11.
- "The Art of the Difficult". Civilization, 4 (August/September 1997): 62–67.
- "Notes About Political Theater," Kenyon Review, 19 (Summer/Fall 1997): 19–34.
- "Wings of Desire". Premiere, October 1997: 70.
- "Fo's Last Laugh—I". Nation, November 3, 1997: 4–5.
- "Matthew's Passion". Nation, November 9, 1998
- "A Modest Proposal". American Theatre, January 1998: 20–22, 77–89.
- "A Word to Graduates: Organize!". Nation, July 1, 2002.
- "Only We Who Guard The Mystery Shall Be Unhappy". Nation, March 24, 2003.

=== Films ===
- Munich, a film by Steven Spielberg (2005) – screenplay (co-written by Eric Roth)
- Lincoln, a film by Steven Spielberg (2012) – screenplay
- Fences, a film by Denzel Washington (2016) – screenplay (uncredited, co-written by August Wilson), co-producer
- West Side Story, a film by Steven Spielberg (2021) – screenplay, executive producer
- The Fabelmans, a film by Steven Spielberg (2022) – screenplay (co-written by Spielberg), producer

=== Television ===
- Angels in America, a miniseries by Mike Nichols (2003) – teleplay
- Hacks, Season 5, playing himself

=== Opera ===
- La Fin de la Baleine: An Opera for the Apocalypse (opera) – 1983
- St. Cecilia or The Power of Music (opera libretto based on Heinrich von Kleist's eighteenth-century story Die heilige Cäcilie oder Die Gewalt der Musik, Eine Legende)
- Brundibar (an opera in collaboration with Maurice Sendak)

=== Director ===
- Helen, written by Ellen McLaughlin, produced at the Joseph Papp Public Theater, 2002.

== Interviews ==
- Gerard Raymond, "Q & A With Tony Kushner," Theatre Week (December 20–26, 1993): 14–20.
- Mark Marvel, "A Conversation with Tony Kushner," Interview, 24 (February 1994): 84.
- David Savran, "Tony Kushner," in Speaking on Stage: Interviews with Contemporary American Playwrights, edited by Philip C. Kolin and Colby H. Kullman (Tuscaloosa: University of Alabama Press, 1996), pp. 291–313.
- Robert Vorlicky, ed., Tony Kushner in Conversation (Ann Arbor: University of Michigan Press, 1998).
- Victor Wishna, "Tony Kushner," in In Their Company: Portraits of American Playwrights, Photographs by Ken Collins, Interviews by Victor Wishna (New York: Umbrage Editions, 2006).
- Jesse Tisch, "The Perfectionist: An Interview with Tony Kushner," Secular Culture & Ideas 2009.
- Christopher Carbone, Q & A With Tony Kushner, L Style G Style, (May/June 2011):
- Michał Hernes, "Kushner: Polityczna dusza Amerykanów została okaleczona" in Polityczna dusza Amerykanów została okaleczona, May 17, 2012.

== Awards and honors ==
Kushner has received various accolades including two Tony Awards and a Primetime Emmy Award along with nominations for four Academy Awards and a Grammy Award.
He has also received various honors including:

- 1993 Pulitzer Prize for Drama – Angels in America: Millennium Approaches
- 2002 PEN/Laura Pels International Foundation for Theater Award for a playwright in mid-career
- 2006 Henry Award for Outstanding New Play for The War Anthology
- 2008 Steinberg Distinguished Playwright Award
- 2011 Puffin/Nation Prize for Creative Citizenship
- 2012 St. Louis Literary Award from the Saint Louis University Library Associates
- 2013 Elected Member, American Philosophical Society
- 2013 The Lincoln Forum's Richard Nelson Current Award of Achievement

== See also ==
- Dramatic license
- LGBT culture in New York City
- List of LGBT people from New York City
- List of Russian Academy Award winners and nominees
