= Barry W. Lynn =

American Christian activist (born 1948)

Barry W. Lynn (born 1948) is an American activist who was the executive director of Americans United for Separation of Church and State from 1992 to November 2017, when he retired. He was ordained as a minister in the United Church of Christ and a prominent leader of the religious left in the United States. Lynn was formerly a member of the District of Columbia Bar Association. He has been known as a strong advocate of separation of church and state.

== Early life ==
Barry W. Lynn was born in Harrisburg, Pennsylvania, in 1948. His family moved to Bethlehem, Pennsylvania, when he was a child, where he attended Bethlehem's Liberty High School, graduating in 1966.

Lynn received his B.A. in 1970 from Dickinson College in Carlisle, Pennsylvania, and his theology degree from Boston University School of Theology in 1973. After attending law school at night, he received his J.D. degree from Georgetown University Law Center.

== Career ==
After law school, Lynn continued to work with the United Church of Christ to gain amnesty for young men who chose desertion to protest the Vietnam War. Before going to Americans United, Lynn held positions related to religious liberties. In the mid-to-late 1980s, he was legislative counsel for Washington's ACLU office, where he frequently worked on church–state issues. From 1974 to 1980, Lynn held positions within the national offices of the United Church of Christ, including two years for the Church's Office of Church in Society in Washington, D.C., as legislative counsel.

Lynn has appeared frequently on radio broadcasts and television to debate and discuss First Amendment issues, including MacNeil/Lehrer News Hour, NBC's Today Show, Nightline, Fox Morning News (Washington, D.C.), CNN's Crossfire, Lou Dobbs Tonight, Anderson Cooper 360°, The Phil Donahue Show, Meet the Press, CBS Morning News, ABC's Good Morning America, NBC Nightly News, ABC World News Tonight, CBS Evening News and Larry King Live. He was formerly a weekly commentator on church-state issues for UPI Radio, and served for two years as regular co-host of Buchanan and Company on the Mutual Broadcasting System.

Lynn hosted the radio program Culture Shocks, until 2013, which could be heard on 1160 AM in Washington, D.C., and on several stations nationally.

Lynn's first book, Piety & Politics: The Right-Wing Assault on Religious Freedom (ISBN 0-307-34654-4), was published in October 2006. His second book, God and Government: Twenty-Five Years of Fighting for Equality, Secularism, and Freedom Of Conscience (ISBN 1633880257) was published in 2015. In 2023, Lynn published his memoirs, Paid to Piss People Off. The work's three volumes are titled, Peace, Porn, and Prayer.

=== Legal actions and positions ===
In 2006 Lynn argued that Focus on the Family’s efforts to bring up moral issues in the 2004 election represented “a blatant effort by [James] Dobson to build a partisan political machine based in churches...[Dobson] has made it abundantly clear that electing Republicans is an integral part of his agenda and he doesn’t mind risking the tax-exemption of churches in the process”.

A separate organization unrelated to Lynn's Americans United later filed a formal complaint with the IRS over Dobson's political endorsements. Lynn did not support this complaint, and the IRS determined that since the endorsements were given by Dobson as a private individual, they did not violate federal tax law.

Americans United filed suit against the InnerChange Freedom Initiative (IFI), a program of Prison Fellowship Ministries. IFI had contracted with the state of Iowa to provide in-prison rehabilitation programs. The suit alleged that the Iowa program violated the separation of church and state in the Constitution. Lynn asserted that the program was saturated with Christian fundamentalism and treated non-fundamentalist inmates like second-class citizens.

Prison Fellowship Ministries responded with claims that the program was effective in reducing recidivism, citing two studies — a 2002 study by the State of Texas and a study done in 2003 by the University of Pennsylvania. These studies were contradicted by UCLA Professor Mark Kleiman's analysis, which found that Colson's 2003 figures were statistically invalid. Two federal courts agreed with Lynn that the program was unconstitutional.

After a federal court struck down the program, Prison Fellowship appealed to the United States Court of Appeals for the Eighth Circuit. The state of Iowa joined with IFI in appealing the decision. The Eighth Circuit Court of Appeals panel consisted of three judges: Duane Benton, Roger Leland Wollman, and retired U.S. Supreme Court Justice Sandra Day O'Connor sitting by special designation. On December 3, 2007, this panel unanimously affirmed the lower court decision, and the IFI program was removed from the Iowa prison.

Lynn was very critical of the Stupak–Pitts Amendment, which was supported by the Catholic Church, and which aims to restrict the federal funding of abortion in health care legislation.

== Awards and honors ==
- 2013 Puffin/Nation Prize for Creative Citizenship
