= Charles E. Cobb Jr. =

American journalist and civil rights activist

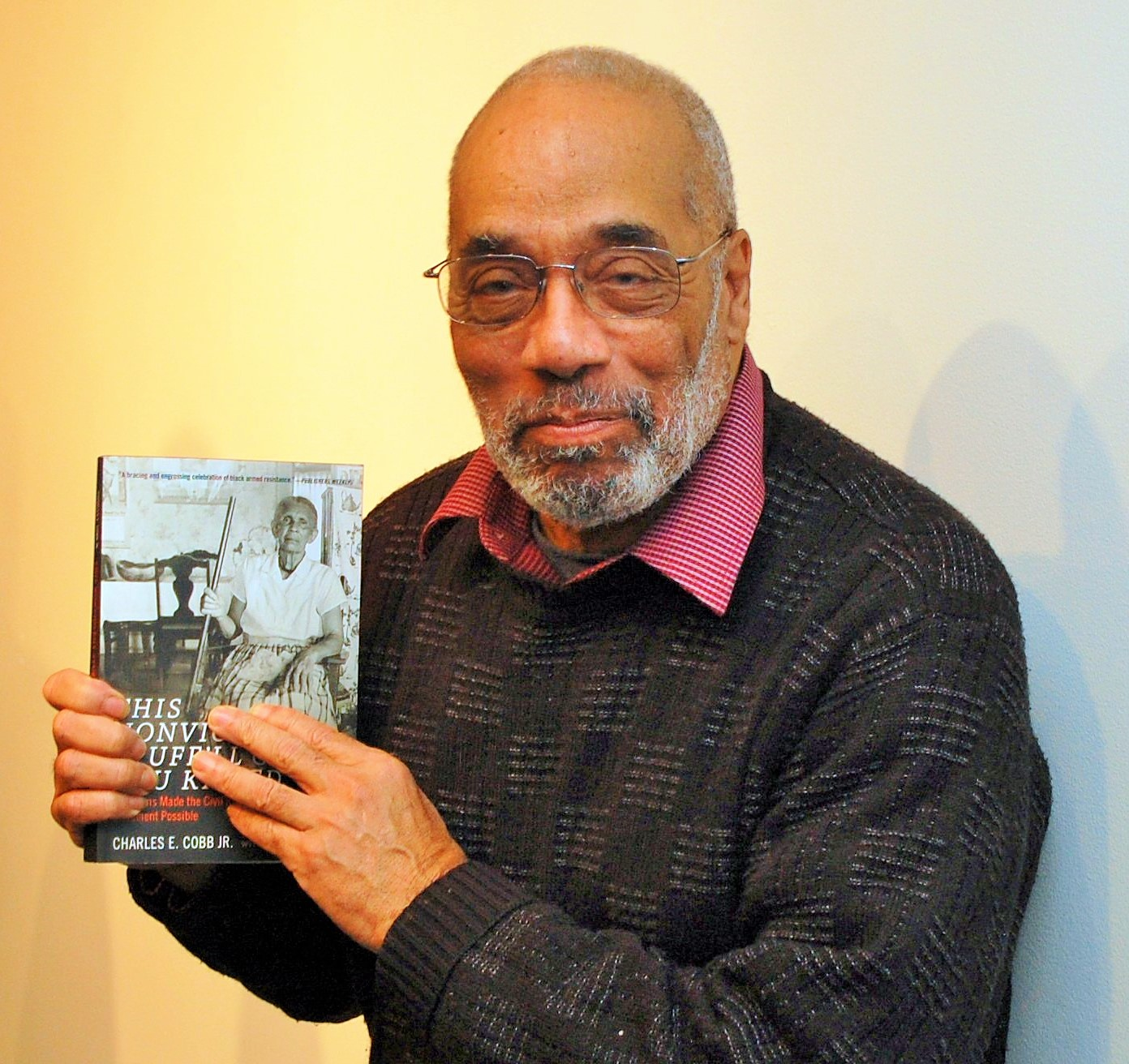
- Cobb at a talk about his book at Potters House in Washington D.C., on February 27, 2016.
- Born: June 23, 1943 (age 83); Springfield, Massachusetts
- Occupation: Journalist
- Known for: Student Nonviolent Coordinating Committee
- Notable work: "This Nonviolent Stuff'll Get You Killed: How Guns Made the Civil Rights Movement Possible"

Charles E. "Charlie" Cobb Jr. (born June 23, 1943) is a journalist, professor, and former activist with the Student Nonviolent Coordinating Committee (SNCC). Along with several veterans of SNCC, Cobb established and operated the African-American bookstore Drum and Spear in Washington, D.C., from 1968 to 1974. Currently he is a senior analyst at allAfrica.com and a visiting professor at Brown University.

== Biography ==
Cobb was born in Washington, D.C., in 1943 and grew up in Springfield, Massachusetts. His parents were politically active. His great-grandfather founded a farming community in Mississippi called New Africa in 1888. In the fall of 1961 Cobb started studies at Howard University where he became active in the Civil Rights Movement. After following and reading about the sit-in demonstrations, Cobb participated in a protest against segregation in Annapolis, Maryland, where he was arrested in an act of civil disobedience. In 1962 he traveled to the Mississippi Delta and became a field secretary for the Student Nonviolent Coordinating Committee (SNCC). His work and activism as SNCC field secretary lasted until 1967. He mainly worked in Washington, Issaquena, and Sunflower counties in Mississippi. While in Mississippi, Cobb wrote a proposal to SNCC to set up Freedom Schools that was submitted in December 1963. Cobb wrote that Freedom Schools should be set up "to fill an intellectual and creative vacuum in the lives of young Negro Mississippians, and to get them to articulate their own desires, demands, and questions..." In 1967 Cobb visited Vietnam with Julius Lester with the assistance of the Bertrand Russell War Crimes Tribunal. After returning, he and other SNCC veterans established Drum and Spear Bookstore in Washington, DC, which became for a time the largest bookstore in the country specializing in books for and about black people. He also helped establish at this time the Center for Black Education in Washington, DC. Later he traveled through parts of Africa, including Tanzania, where he lived in 1970 and 1971.

In 1974 Cobb began his career in journalism when he began reporting for WHUR Radio in Washington, DC. Later, in 1976, Cobb started work at National Public Radio as a foreign affairs reporter, working on the network's coverage of Africa. Cobb helped to establish the NPR's first coverage of African affairs. After leaving National Public Radio, Cobb worked as a correspondent for the PBS show Frontline from 1983 until 1985. In 1985 he became the first black staff writer for National Geographic Magazine. He was a member of National Geographic′s editorial staff from 1985 to 1997. Currently Cobb is a senior analyst at allAfrica.com.

== Recognition ==
Cobb was a founding member of the National Association of Black Journalists and was inducted into their Hall of Fame in 2008. Cobb is currently a visiting professor of Africana studies at Brown University, where he teaches a course called "The Organizing Tradition of the Southern Civil Rights Movement."

== Selected publications ==
- Radical Equations: Civil Rights from Mississippi to the Algebra Project, with Bob Moses (Beacon Press, 2001), ISBN 9780807031278
- No Easy Victories: African Liberation and American Activists Over a Half Century, 1950-2000, edited with William Minter and Gail Hovey (Africa World Press, 2007), ISBN 1592215750
- On the Road to Freedom: A Guided Tour of the Civil Rights Trail (Algonquin Books, 2008), ISBN 1565124391
- This Nonviolent Stuff'll Get You Killed: How Guns Made the Civil Rights Movement Possible (Basic Books, 2014, Duke University Press, 2015 pb), ISBN 0465033105
