= Britte Hughey =

American farmer and politician

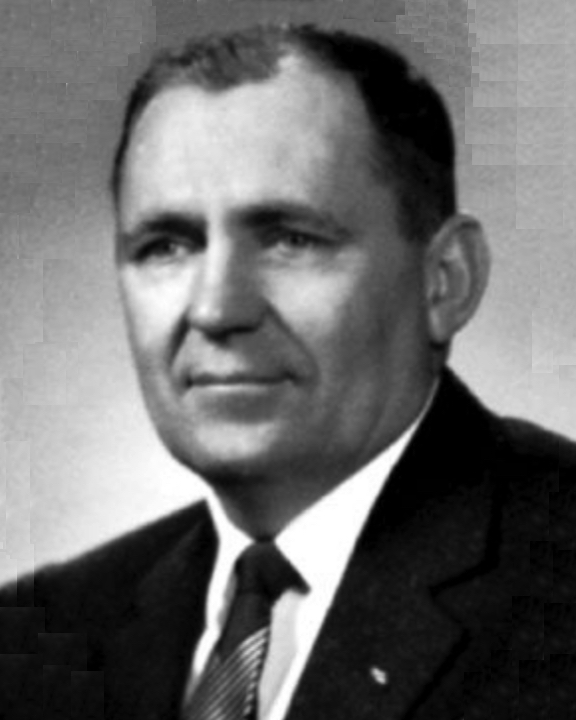

Member of the Mississippi House of Representatives from Amite County
- In office 1956–1964
- Preceded by: T. F. Badon
- Succeeded by: Frank Wall

Personal details
- Born: Britte Edwin Hughey; April 28, 1910 Smithdale, Mississippi, U.S.
- Died: January 27, 1986 (aged 75) McComb, Mississippi, U.S.
- Party: Democratic
- Spouse: Norma Williams (m. 1934)

Britte Edwin Hughey (April 28, 1910 – January 27, 1986) was an American farmer and politician who served in the Mississippi House of Representatives. Elected twice from Amite County, he was a member of the local Farm Bureau and Citizens' Council, a white supremacist organization.

== Election history ==
Hughey was elected in 1955 and 1959 alongside Frank Wall and E. H. Hurst, respectively. In 1963, Amite was apportioned only one seat in the House, and Wall defeated him for the Democratic nomination.

Mississippi House of Representatives
Preceded by T. F. Badon	Mississippi Representative from Amite County; 1956–1964; Served alongside: Frank Wall; E. H. Hurst	Succeeded by Frank Wall
