= Algebra Project =

U.S. mathematics literacy program

The Algebra Project is a national U.S. mathematics literacy program aimed at helping low-income students and students of color achieve the mathematical skills in high school that are a prerequisite for a college preparatory mathematics sequence. Founded by Civil Rights activist and Math educator Bob Moses in the 1980s, the Algebra Project provides curricular materials, teacher training, and professional development support and community involvement activities for schools to improve mathematics education.

By 2001, the Algebra Project had trained approximately 300 teachers and was reaching 10,000 students in 28 locations in 10 states.

== History ==
The Algebra Project was founded in 1982 by Bob Moses in Cambridge, Massachusetts. Moses worked with his daughter's eighth-grade teacher, Mary Lou Mehrling, to provide extra tutoring for several students in her class in algebra. Moses, who had taught secondary school mathematics in New York City and Tanzania, wanted to ensure that those students had sufficient algebra skills to qualify for honors math and science courses in high school. Through his tutorage, students from the Open Program of the Martin Luther King School passed the citywide algebra examination and qualified for ninth grade honors geometry, the first students from the program to do so. The Algebra Project grew out of attempts to recreate this on a wider community level, to provide similar students with a higher level of mathematical literacy.

The Algebra Project now focuses on the southern states of the United States, where the Southern Initiative of the Algebra Project is directed by Dave Dennis.

== Young People's Project ==
Founded in 1996, the Young People's Project (YPP) is a spin-off of the Algebra Project, which recruits and trains high school and college age "Math Literacy Workers" to tutor younger students in mathematics, and is directed by Omowale Moses. YPP has established sites in Jackson, Mississippi, Chicago, and the Greater Boston area of Massachusetts, and is developing programs in Miami, Petersburg, Virginia, Los Angeles, Ann Arbor, and Mansfield, Ohio. Each site employs between 30 and 100 high school and college age students part-time, and serves up to 1,000 elementary and middle-school students through on and off site programs.

In 2005, the Algebra Project initiated Quality Education as a Civil Right (QECR), a national organizing effort to establish a federal constitutional guarantee of quality public education for all. Throughout 2005, YPP worked with students from Baltimore, New Orleans, Los Angeles, Oakland, Miami, Jackson, Chicago and Virginia to raise awareness about QECR. The Algebra Project and YPP students from Jackson and New Orleans hosted conferences, organized a Spring Break Community Education Tour to Miami and participated in QECR planning meetings at Howard University, the University of Michigan, and Jackson State University.
