= Puffin/Nation Prize for Creative Citizenship =

The Puffin Prize for Creative Citizenship is an American award given jointly by Type Media Center (a nonprofit media organization previously associated with The Nation magazine) and the Puffin Foundation. The annual $100,000 award honors artists and others who have "challenged the status quo through distinctive, courageous, imaginative and socially responsible work of significance." The prize is intended to "encourage the recipients to continue their work, and to inspire others to challenge the prevailing orthodoxies they face in their careers." The inaugural award was in 2001.

The Puffin Prize for Creative Citizenship was renamed in 2017. It was formerly known as the Puffin/Nation Prize for Creative Citizenship.

== Winners ==
- 2001 Robert Parris Moses
- 2002 Dolores Huerta
- 2003 David Protess
- 2004 Barbara Ehrenreich
- 2005 Jonathan Kozol
- 2006 Amy Goodman
- 2007 Michael Ratner
- 2008 Van Jones
- 2009 Jim Hightower
- 2010 Bill McKibben
- 2010 Cecile Richards
- 2011 Tony Kushner
- 2012 Benjamin Todd Jealous
- 2013 Barry W. Lynn
- 2014 Frances Fox Piven
- 2015 William J. Barber II
- 2016 Bryan Stevenson
- 2017 Colin Kaepernick
- 2018 Parkland student activists
- 2019 The Sunrise Movement
- 2020 Desmond Meade
- 2021 The National Network for Abortion Funds
