= Type Media Center =

American nonprofit media organization

- Established: 1966 (as The Nation Institute)
- Mission: “To produce high-impact journalism and literary nonfiction that addresses injustice and inequality, catalyzes change, informs and uplifts social movements.”
- Focus: Journalism
- Director: Taya Kitman
- Staff: 13
- Location: New York City, New York, United States
- Website: typemediacenter.org

Type Media Center (founded in 1966 as The Nation Institute) is an American nonprofit media organization that supports journalism and literary nonfiction through fellowships, an investigative newsroom, public programs, and book publishing partnerships. In 2019, the organization rebranded from The Nation Institute to Type Media Center alongside renaming its book imprint from Nation Books to Bold Type Books.

Type Media Center fellows have included Naomi Klein, Wayne Barrett, Chris Hedges, David Moberg, Elie Mystal, Jeremy Scahill, and Chris Hayes. The organization has also funded podcasts, short form broadcast media, and documentaries, including several by Habiba Nosheen.

Type is one of the presenters of the Ridenhour Prizes. It collaborates on the Puffin Prize for Creative Citizenship with the Puffin Foundation. Tom Engelhardt is the creator of the organization's TomDispatch.com, a widely syndicated online blog.

Type started its publishing imprint Bold Type Books (formerly Nation Books) in 2000, in partnership with Thunder's Mouth Press. In 2007, Perseus Books Group acquired Avalon Publishing Group, which was the parent company of Thunder's Mouth Press. Bold Type Books’ current partner imprint is Hachette Book Group.

Type’s investigative newsroom, Type Investigations (formerly The Investigative Fund), was relaunched under its current name in January 2019. It commissions and co-publishes long-form investigations with partner outlets across print, audio, and television rather than primarily distributing through its own platform.

In addition to working with freelance reporters, Type Investigations’ past and current reporting fellows have included Nick Turse, Wayne Barrett, Jeremy Scahill, Sharon Lerner, Janine di Giovanni, Lee Fang, Sarah Posner, John Carlos Frey, and Ali Gharib. Reporting supported by Type Investigations has received major journalism honors and philanthropic support from independent institutions. In 2021, the MacArthur Foundation awarded Type Media Center a $300,000 Journalism & Media grant for its accountability reporting program.

== See also ==
- The Nation
- Institute for Nonprofit News (Type Investigations is a member)
