= Doris Castle =

American civil rights activist

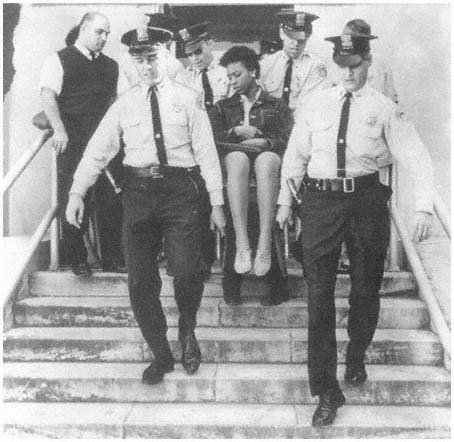
1963 photo of New Orleans CORE member Doris Jean Castle being removed by police from a demonstration at the local City Hall

Doris Jean Castle (May 25, 1942 – April 16, 1998) was a civil rights activist who helped with the New Orleans chapter of the Congress of Racial Equality (CORE). She aided African Americans across the New Orleans area alongside her sister, Oretha Castle Haley. Castle was one of the youngest Freedom Riders in New Orleans. She was only seventeen years old when she started fighting for civil rights activism.

== Biography ==
Doris Castle was born on May 25, 1942, in Oakland, Tennessee. Both branches of her ancestors were farmers; one were landowners and the others were sharecroppers. Castle recalled her grandmother saying things such as "Don't ever bow to anybody when you feel you're right or you know you're right". Her family moved to New Orleans, Louisiana, in 1947. Her father, John Castle, was a longshoreman while her mother, Virgie Castle was a barmaid for Leah and Dooky Chase restaurants. Her parents taught her and her sister to be “fiercely independent”. Doris and her sister Oretha grew up with working parents who believed you had to fight for what you wanted in life. They attended public schools in the Ninth Ward neighborhood of New Orleans, where the two girls grew up.

Castle graduated from Joseph S. Clark High School. Some years later, she went to Southern University at New Orleans but was never able to finish her degree. She followed in her sister's footsteps by joining CORE and helping in civil rights organizations throughout the city. Castle and Oretha were part of the third generation of New Orleans activist leaders. Castle saw herself as her sister's enabler by being more of a worker in the New Orleans black community than a leader. She and her sister helped to desegregate New Orleans public service buses, worked for voter registration and joined boycotts around the city to push for equal employment among blacks. During one protest against segregation of the New Orleans City Hall cafeteria, police removed Castle, still seated in a cafeteria chair, from the building. Castle was one of three plaintiffs in a successful lawsuit to desegregate the City Hall cafeteria.

Many Louisiana women activists for the civil rights movement were not given much recognition for their actions. However, throughout the 1960s and the 1970s Castle went to work as a fundraiser for George Wiley's National Welfare Rights Organization, after which she worked for various service agencies in New Orleans, including under Lyndon Johnson's war on poverty initiative, the Urban League, and Odyssey House. In an interview with Shannon Frystak, Castle said, "If I had not been a part of the civil rights movement, I probably would have finished college, married a young man, had three or four kids, a very comfortable home, probably work- and career- orientated in some shape, form, or fashion and took part in most of the things that acceptable Americans take part in: go to church on Sunday, work Monday through Friday, picnic on Saturday... I don't know that I would have been as valuable to myself as I feel that I am because of what I did experience in the civil rights movement" (Frystak 107).

Castle was married and divorced twice, to former city councilman Johnny Jackson Jr. and Allen Scott. She had no children.

In the fall of 1987 her sister, Oretha Castle Haley, died of ovarian cancer. Mourning, Castle excluded herself from political involvement in the community. In 1989 she took her sister's place as the night admissions supervisor at Charity Hospital in New Orleans. Ten years later, Doris Castle died on April 16, 1998, from cancer.

=== CORE ===
The Congress of Racial Equality is an African American civil rights organization that aided African Americans during the civil rights movement. This organization staged sit-ins and desegregation attempts at local cafeterias, theaters and restaurants. CORE also helped to validate the actions of women leaders at the time by calling them into action in rural Louisiana.

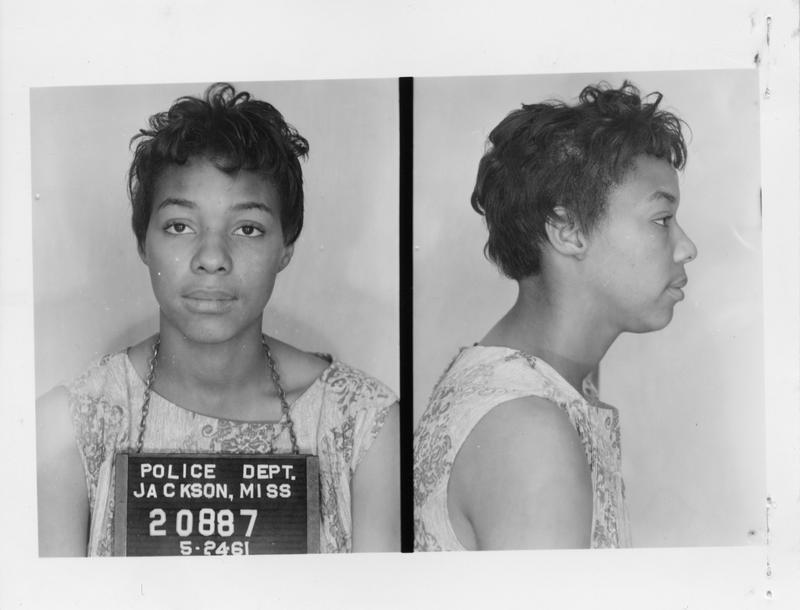
1961 arrest photo of New Orleans CORE member Doris Jean Castle as Freedom Rider

After Castle graduated high school her parents gave her a trip to Chicago as a graduation present. There she learned her sister had been arrested back in New Orleans for carrying a picket sign, after which she helped start the first New Orleans chapter of CORE. Castle participated in local and national sit-ins as well as helping raise funds for the national organization.

Many women in the CORE organization, including Castle, were physically and sexually harassed by white men in sit-ins, picket fence lines and jail cells. These women fought harder to achieve racial justice.

The Castle family was very involved in the CORE in New Orleans; their Treme-Laffite house was used as a meeting place to discuss strategies and house other local activists. Their house became known as "the Freedom House".

The New Orleans chapter experienced a rough patch between 1960 and 1961 when many of their members returned to school or worked on other War on Poverty organizations.

==== Freedom Riders ====
Freedom Riders were civil rights activists who rode interstate buses into the South protesting segregation. Doris rode the Freedom Riders bus from Montgomery, Alabama to Jackson, Mississippi on May 24, 1961, and was arrested the next day because of her involvement. She spent her nineteenth birthday in Parchman Penitentiary.

In an interview with Kim Lacy Rogers, Castle talked about the night before they rode the freedom bus. "I know we were all afraid that night we got on the train at Union Station and left here and went to Montgomery" (Rogers 129).
