= Liberty, Mississippi =

- Town
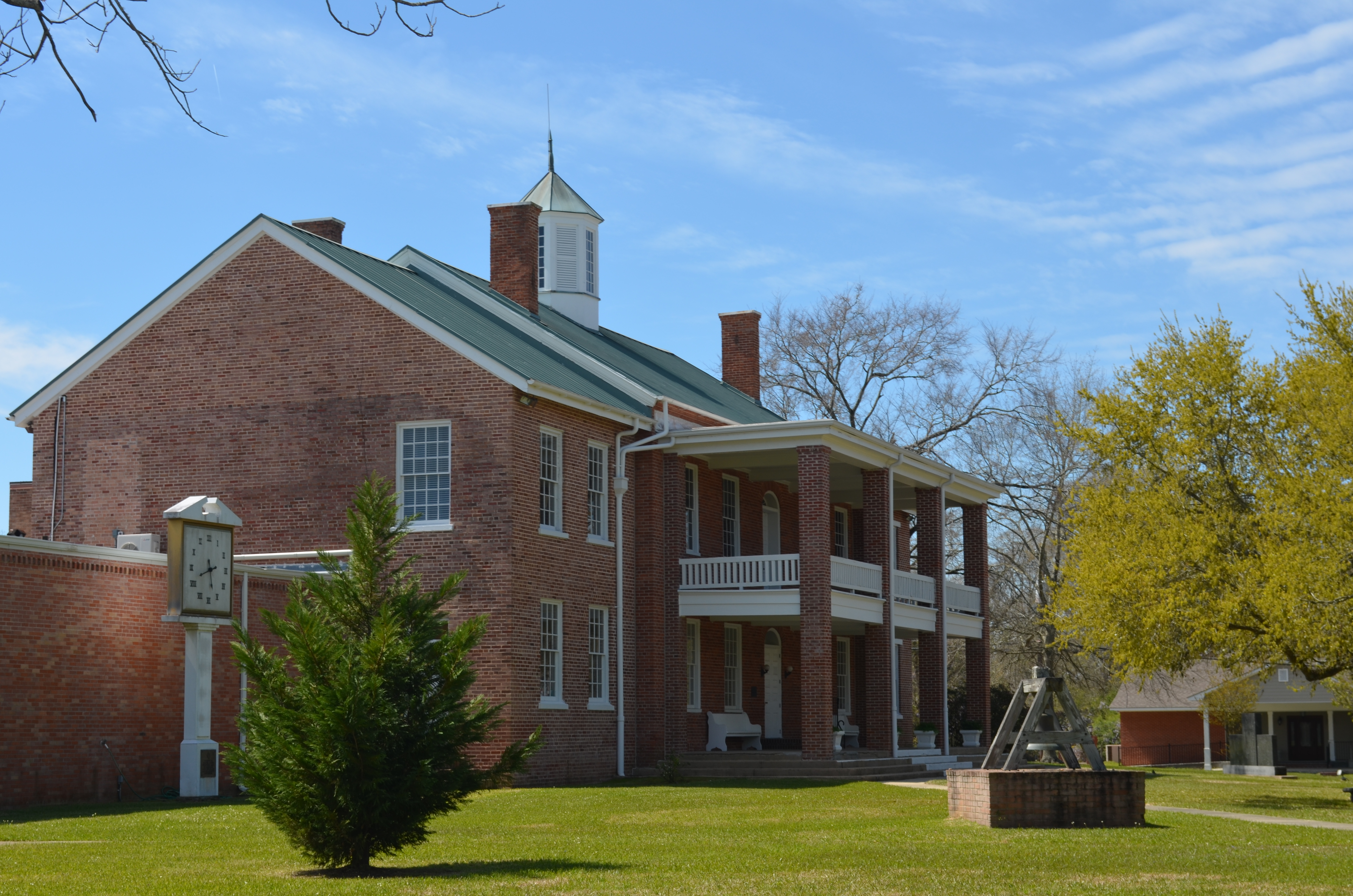
- Amite County Courthouse in Liberty

- Location of Liberty, Mississippi

- Location in the United States
- Coordinates: 31°9′39″N 90°48′14″W
- Country: United States
- State: Mississippi
- County: Amite

Government
  - Mayor: Pat Talbert

Area
  - Total: 2.06 sq mi (5.34 km^{2})
  - Land: 2.06 sq mi (5.34 km^{2})
  - Water: 0 sq mi (0.00 km^{2})
- Elevation: 338 ft (103 m)

Population (2020)
  - Total: 560
  - Density: 272/sq mi (104.9/km^{2})
- Time zone: UTC-6 (Central (CST))
  - Summer (DST): UTC-5 (CDT)
- ZIP code: 39645
- Area code: 601
- FIPS code: 28-40640
- GNIS feature ID: 0672435
- Website: www.amitecounty.ms/liberty

Liberty is a town in Amite County, Mississippi, United States. As of the 2020 census, Liberty had a population of 560. It is part of the McComb, Mississippi micropolitan statistical area. It is the county seat of Amite County.

The town can be accessed via I-55, then west on Mississippi Highway 24. McGehee Air Park is located about a mile west of town.

Liberty celebrates its Heritage Days Festival during the first weekend of each May.

Air Cruisers manufacturing plant is located in Liberty. Owned by Zodiac Aerospace, the plant produces evacuation slides, life rafts, and life vests for the aviation industry.

Eleven sites in or near Liberty are listed on the National Register of Historic Places.

== History ==
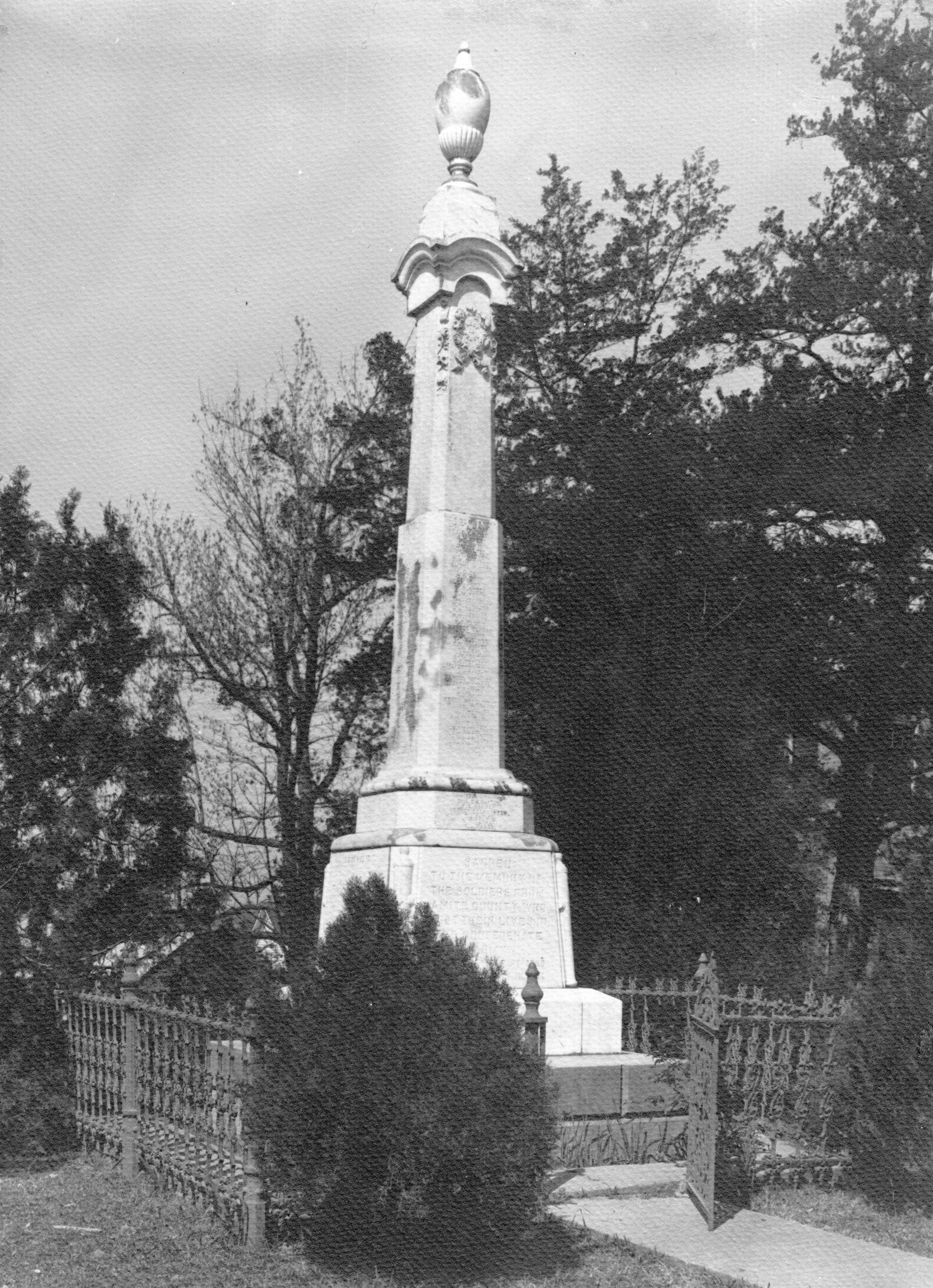
Erected in 1871, the Confederate Monument in Liberty was the first in Mississippi.

Liberty was incorporated on February 24, 1809. The Amite County Courthouse in Liberty is the oldest in Mississippi. Erected in 1839, the courthouse was enlarged and modernized in 1936. It is listed on the National Register of Historic Places.

The Amite Female Seminary (also known as the 'Little Red Schoolhouse'), built in 1853, was a girls finishing school located in Liberty. During the American Civil War, in the spring of 1863, Federal troops under the command of Colonel Benjamin Grierson, a former music teacher, burned the school, but spared the school's music building. The Federal commander permitted musical instruments to be removed, and was prepared to give the order to torch the building, when he recognized the music school's director, Rev. Milton Shirk, as a former classmate from New York. The two-story, two-room music building survives to this day on Mississippi Highway 569, and is listed on the National Register of Historic Places.

Gail Borden, who developed a process in the early 1850s for condensing milk and founded the New York Condensed Milk Company (later known as Borden Inc., lived in Liberty from 1822 to 1829.

Between 1904 and 1921, a branch of the Liberty–White Railroad, a narrow-gauge logging rail line serving the White Lumber Company, ran between McComb, Mississippi and Liberty.

During the Civil Rights Movement, in September 1961, Herbert Lee, an African-American dairy farmer and member of NAACP, was murdered in Liberty at the Westbrook Cotton Gin by E.H. Hurst, a white state legislator. Lee had attended voter registration classes and volunteered to try to register to vote, Witnesses to the killing were intimidated by armed white men in the courtroom to support Hurst's claim of self-defense, and he was released without charges. Louis Allen, a married African-American landowner with a logging business, reported the truth about the crime to federal officials while seeking protection for testimony. He did not get protection. He suffered economic blackmail, arrests and harassment, and was killed in January 1964.

Liberty was the location of the fourth-wettest tropical cyclone in Mississippi in 2001; Tropical Storm Allison dropped 18.95 inches (481 mm) of precipitation.

Liberty, Texas is thought to have been named after this town, as numerous families from Amite County moved west in the 1820s to settle in the Atascosito district north-east of Houston.

== Geography ==
According to the United States Census Bureau, the town covers an area of 2.0 square miles (5.3 km^{2}), of which 0.00077 square miles (0.002 km^{2}), or 0.03%, is water.

== Demographics ==
Historical population
Census	Pop.	Note	%±
1900	392		—
1910	556		41.8%
1920	515		−7.4%
1930	551		7.0%
1940	665		20.7%
1950	683		2.7%
1960	642		−6.0%
1970	612		−4.7%
1980	669		9.3%
1990	624		−6.7%
2000	633		1.4%
2010	728		15.0%
2020	560		−23.1%
U.S. Decennial Census

Liberty racial composition as of 2020
Race	Num.	Perc.
White (non-Hispanic)	403	71.96%
Black or African American (non-Hispanic)	122	21.79%
Other/Mixed	21	3.75%
Hispanic or Latino	14	2.5%

As of the 2020 United States census, there were 560 people, 282 households, and 184 families residing in the town.

== Education ==
The town of Liberty is served by the Amite County School District. Liberty is also the home of Amite School Center, a K-12 education institution that is a member of the Mississippi Association of Independent Schools. The town manages a state property named the Ethel Stratton Vance Natural Area, just west of town, which is often used for educational purposes and is home to sports fields, camping areas, a large equestrian center, and over 200 acres of biologically diverse ravines, beaver impoundments, and bottomland hardwood forest along the West Fork Amite River.

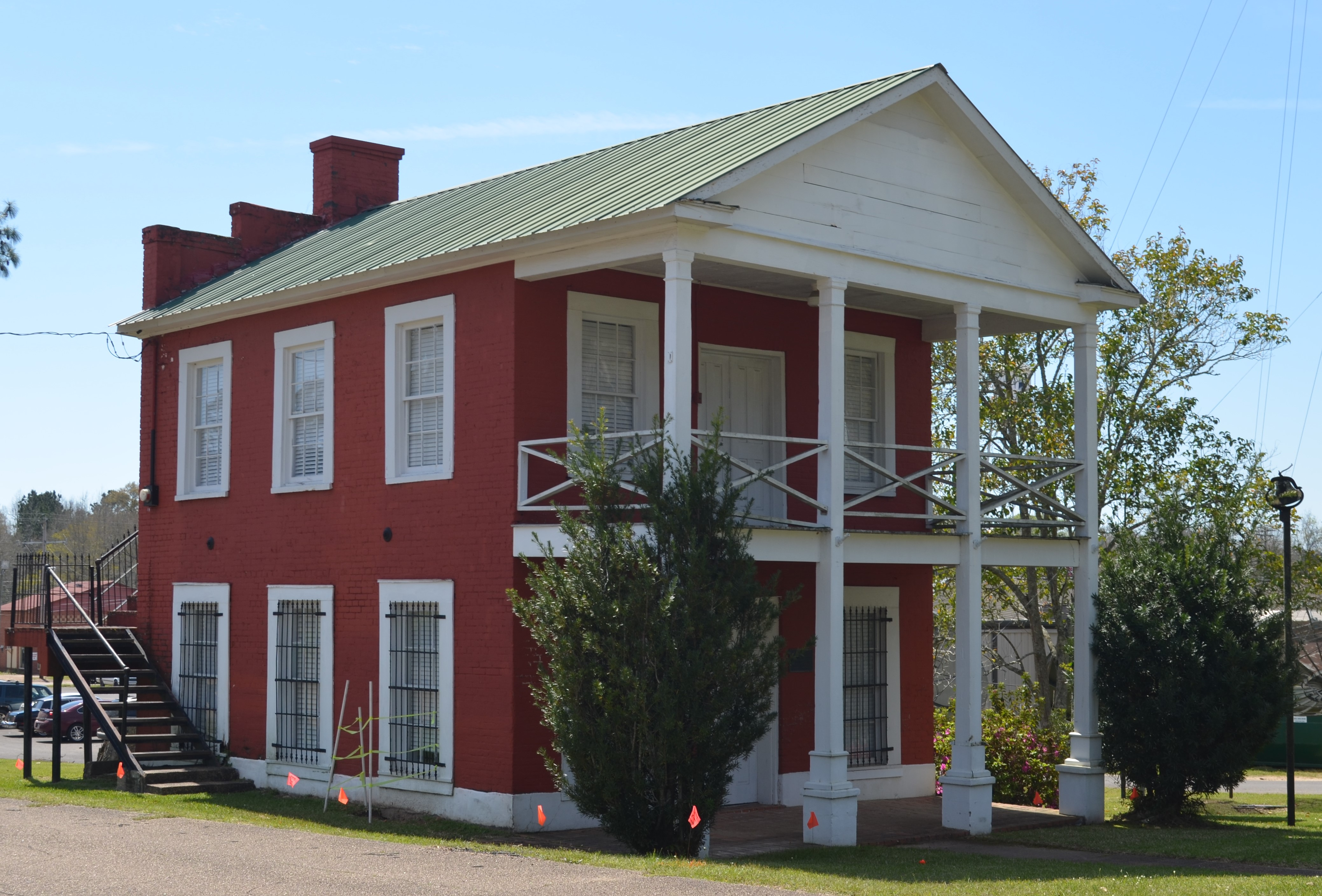
Amite Female Seminary, commonly known as the "Little Red Schoolhouse," established in 1853 and spared during the Civil War

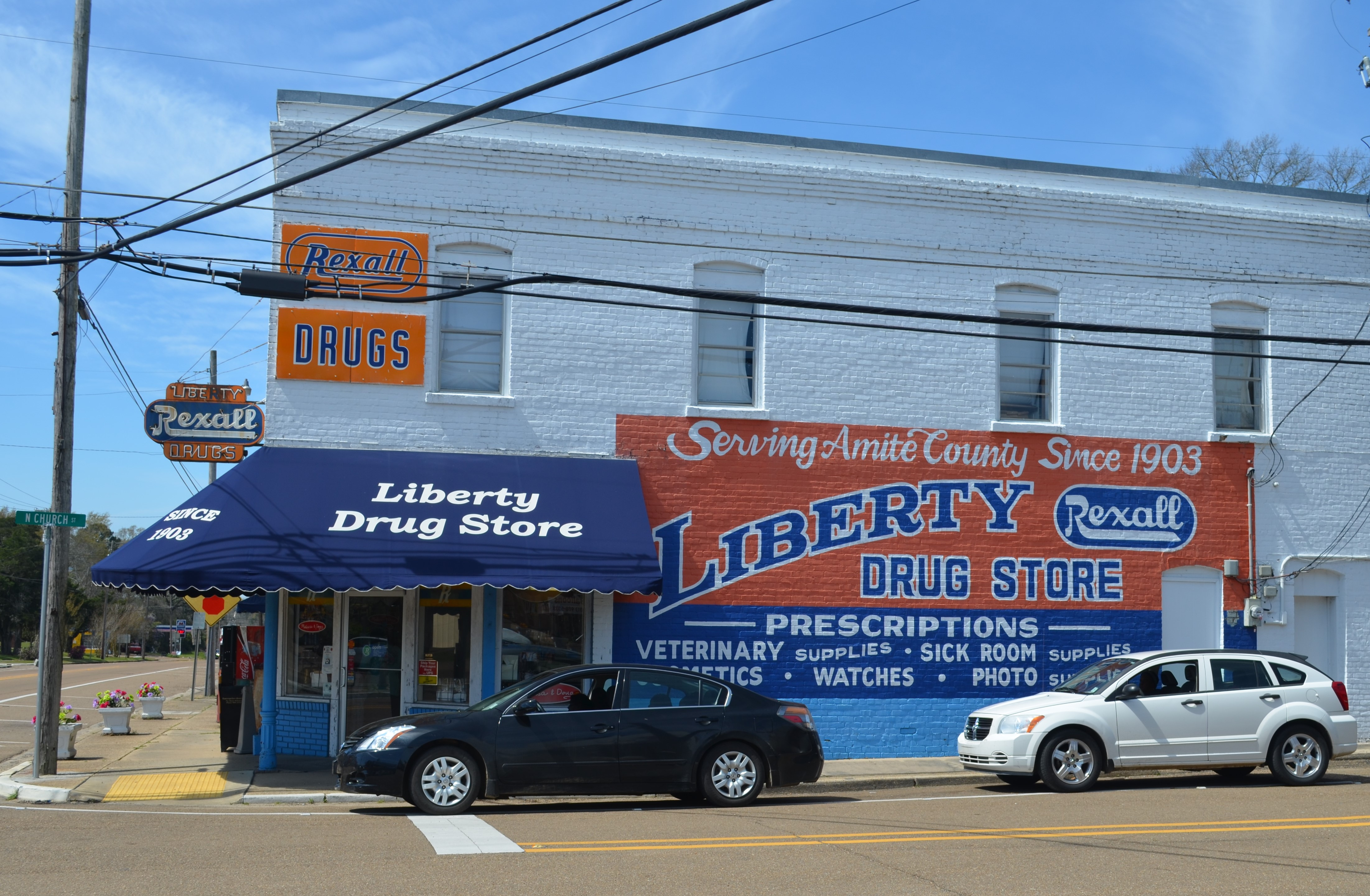
Liberty (Rexall) Drug Store, Main Street

== Notable people ==
- Louis Allen, property owner and logger
- T. F. Badon, member of the Mississippi House of Representatives from 1952 to 1956
- L. C. Bates, African-American civil rights activist and the husband of Daisy Bates.
- James Brown, former American football offensive lineman
- Will D. Campbell, minister, author, and civil rights activist
- Jerry Clower, country comedian
- E. H. Hurst, member of the Mississippi House of Representatives
- Gabe Jackson, American football player for the Oakland Raiders, Las Vegas Raiders and Seattle Seahawks of the National Football League (NFL)
- Herbert Lee, civil rights activist
- William F. Love, U.S. Representative from Mississippi
- Glenn Moore, softball coach
- Clyde V. Ratcliff, member of the Louisiana Senate from 1944 to 1948, was born in Liberty in 1879
- Andy Rodgers, (March 14, 1922 – August 14, 2004) was a Delta blues harmonicist, guitarist, singer and songwriter born nearby Liberty in 1922
- Jamie Lynn Spears, actress and singer
- George H. Tichenor, inventor of an antiseptic, briefly lived and married in Liberty
