= Bob Moses (activist) =

American educator and activist (1935–2021)

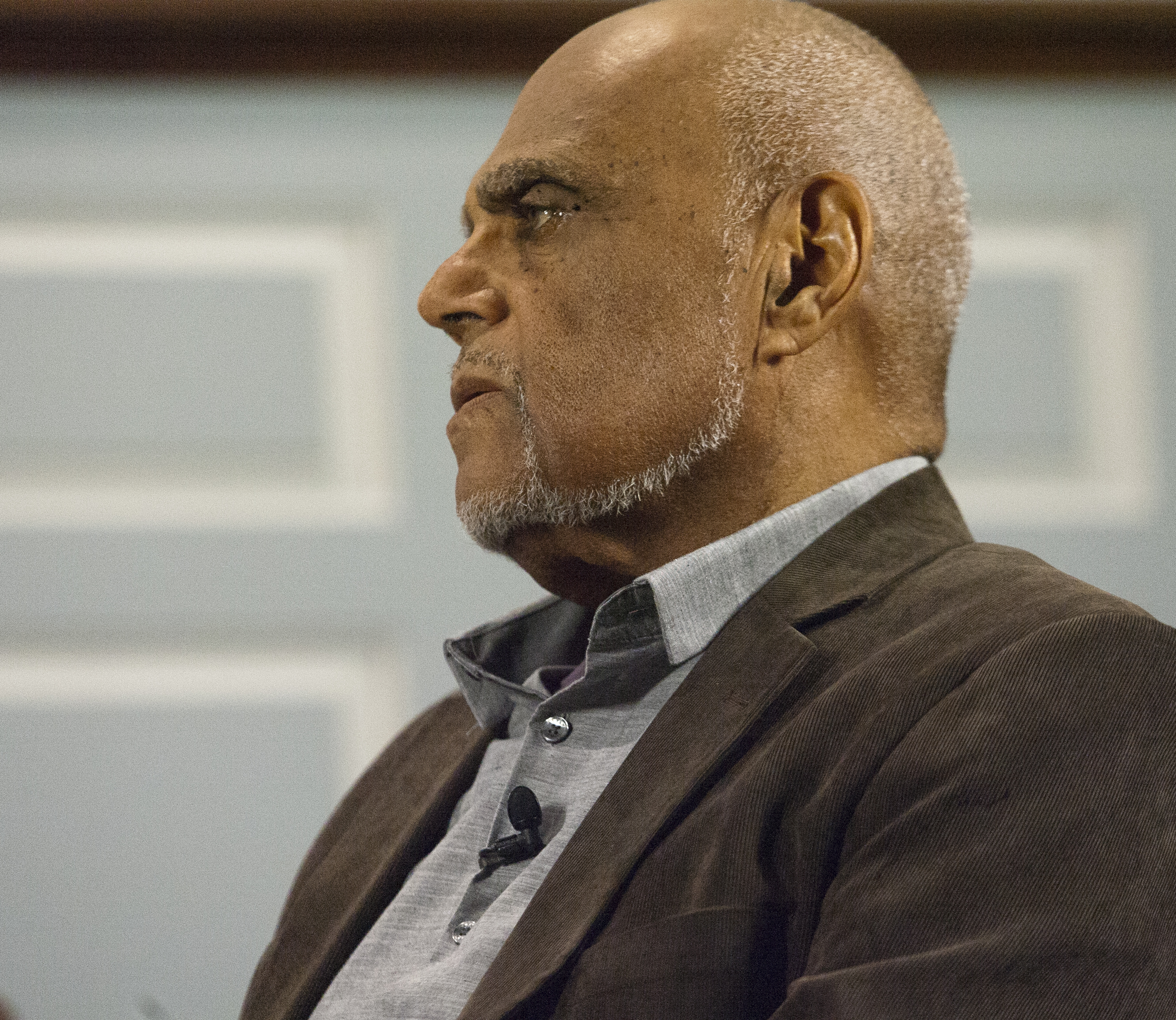
- Moses in 2014
- Born: Robert Parris Moses; January 23, 1935; New York City, U.S.
- Died: July 25, 2021 (aged 86); Hollywood, Florida, U.S.
- Education: Hamilton College (BA); Harvard University (MA)
- Occupations: Activist; educator
- Organization(s): Student Nonviolent Coordinating Committee (SNCC); Council of Federated Organizations (COFO)
- Known for: Freedom Summer; Algebra Project
- Title: Cornell University Frank H. T. Rhodes Class of '56 Professor
- Movement: Civil Rights Movement
- Spouse(s): Dona Richards; Janet Jemmott
- Children: 4
- Awards: MacArthur Fellowship (1982); War Resisters League Peace Award (1997); Heinz Award for the Human Condition (1999); Puffin/Nation Prize for Creative Citizenship (2001); Margaret Chase Smith American Democracy Award (2001); James Bryant Conant Award (2002); Alphonse Fletcher Sr. Fellowship (2005); Honorary Degree, Swarthmore College (2007)

Robert Parris Moses (January 23, 1935 – July 25, 2021) was an American educator and civil rights activist known for his work as a leader of the Student Nonviolent Coordinating Committee (SNCC) on voter education and registration in Mississippi during the Civil Rights Movement, and his co-founding of the Mississippi Freedom Democratic Party. As part of his work with the Council of Federated Organizations (COFO), a coalition of the Mississippi branches of the four major civil rights organizations (SNCC, CORE, NAACP, SCLC), he was the main organizer for the Freedom Summer Project.

Born and raised in Harlem, he was a graduate of Hamilton College and later earned a Master's degree in philosophy at Harvard University. He spent the 1960s working in the civil rights and anti-war movements, until he was drafted in 1966 and left the country, spending much of the following decade in Tanzania, teaching and working with the Ministry of Education.

After returning to the US, in 1982, Moses received a MacArthur Fellowship and began developing the Algebra Project. The math literacy program emphasizes teaching algebra skills to minority students based on broad-based community organizing and collaboration with parents, teachers, and students, to improve college and job readiness.

== Early life ==
Robert Parris Moses was born January 23, 1935, in New York City. His parents, Gregory H. Moses, a janitor, and Louise (Parris) Moses, a homemaker, raised their three children in the public housing complex, Harlem River Houses, with frequent visits to the public library. He graduated from Stuyvesant High School in 1952 and received his B.A. from Hamilton College in 1956. At Hamilton he majored in philosophy and French and played basketball. In 1957, he earned an M.A. in philosophy at Harvard, and was working toward a PhD but his mother's death and father's hospitalization brought him back to New York City, and in 1958 began teaching math at the Horace Mann School in the Bronx of New York City. Also in 1958, he was private tutor to singer Frankie Lymon, of The Teenagers, and credited his experience visiting Black sections of numerous towns with the doo-wop group for his recognition of the emergence of a distinct urban Black culture scattered across the nation.

== Civil rights movement ==
External videos
- "Eyes on the Prize; Interview with Robert Moses" conducted in 1986 for the Eyes on the Prize documentary in which he discusses the reasons he joined the civil rights movement and his working relationships with other activists.

Moses described his civil rights activism starting in the spring of 1960, when he visited his uncle, Hampton Institute professor of architecture William Henry Moses Jr. and witnessed Hampton students marching from the college to Newport News, Virginia as part of the sit-in movement. Moses went on to becoming field secretary for the Student Nonviolent Coordinating Committee (SNCC). Following the direction of Ella Baker, he began working in Mississippi, becoming director of the SNCC's Mississippi Project in 1961 and traveling to Pike County and Amite County, developing a network of grassroots activists to try to register black voters. Comprising a majority in both counties, despite many people leaving in the Great Migration in the first half of the century, they had been utterly closed out of the political process since 1890, by poll taxes, residency requirements, and subjective literacy tests. It was nearly impossible for blacks to register and vote. After decades of violence and repression under Jim Crow, by the 1960s, most blacks did not bother trying to register. In 1965, only one African American among 5500 in Amite County was registered to vote. Initiating and organizing voter registration drives as well as sit-ins and Freedom Schools, Moses pushed for the SNCC to engage in a "tactical nonviolence," a matter he discussed in an interview with Robert Penn Warren for the book Who Speaks for the Negro?.

Moses faced nearly relentless violence and official intimidation and was beaten and arrested in Amite County. He was the first African American to challenge white violence in the county, filing assault charges against his attacker. The all-white jury acquitted the man, and the judge told Moses he could not protect him, escorting him to the county line. Around Moses, others in the movement like Herbert Lee and witnesses like Louis Allen were murdered.

By 1964 Moses had become co-director of the Council of Federated Organizations (COFO), an umbrella organization for the major civil rights groups working in Mississippi (SNCC, CORE, NAACP, SCLC). A major leader with SNCC, he was the main organizer of COFO's Freedom Summer Project, which was intended to achieve widespread voter registration of blacks in Mississippi, and ultimately end racial disfranchisement. They planned education, organizing, and a simplified registration system to demonstrate African-American desire to vote. Moses was one of the calm leaders who kept the group focused.

On June 21, as many of the new volunteers were getting settled and trained in nonviolent resistance, three were murdered: James Chaney, a local African American, and his two Jewish co-leaders Andrew Goodman and Michael Schwerner, both from New York City. The remaining volunteers were frightened, and Moses gathered them together to discuss the risks they faced. He said that now that they had seen first-hand what could happen, they had every right to go home, and no one would blame them for leaving. This was not the first murder of activists in the South, but the Civil Rights Movement had attracted increasing notice from the national media. Many African-American volunteers were angered that publicity appeared to be based on two of the victims being white Northerners. Moses helped ease tensions. The volunteers struggled with the idea of nonviolence, of blacks and whites working together, and related issues. Moses's leadership was a major cohesive factor for a number of volunteers staying.

Moses became one of the influential black leaders of the civil rights struggle and had a vision of grassroots and community-based leadership. Although Moses' leadership style was different from Rev. Martin Luther King Jr.'s, King appreciated the contributions that Moses made to the movement, calling them inspiring.

Moses was instrumental in the organizing of the Mississippi Freedom Democratic Party, a group that challenged the all-white regular Democratic Party delegates from the state at the party's 1964 convention. Because the Democratic Regulars had for decades excluded African Americans from the political process in Mississippi, the MFDP wanted their elected delegates seated at the convention instead of the all-white Democratic delegation. Their challenge received national media coverage and highlighted the civil rights struggle in the state. Lyndon Johnson and the Democratic leadership nonetheless prevented any of the MFDP delegation from voting in the convention, giving the official seats to the Jim Crow regulars. Moses and the rest of the SNCC activists were profoundly disillusioned by this decision. Moses was also disturbed by the machinations of liberal Democrats, whom he had invited into COFO, to centralize the Council's decision-making, an effort that seemed to undermine the grassroots participatory democracy of SNCC.

In late 1964, Moses resigned his role in COFO, saying later that his role had become "too strong, too central, so that people who did not need to, began to lean on me, to use me as a crutch", which ran contrary to his organizing style that focused on empowering others to take on leadership roles. He temporarily dropped his last name, instead using Parris, his middle name, and began participating in the effort to end the Vietnam War. Speaking at the April 17, 1965, demonstration at the Washington Monument, Moses drew a connection between the anti-war effort and the civil rights struggle. As he became increasingly involved with the anti-war movement, he took a leave from SNCC to avoid conflict with members who did not share his views. Following a trip to Africa in 1965, Moses developed a conviction in the necessity of autonomous Black struggle and by 1966 he ceased working with white activists, even former SNCC activists.

In 1966 Moses received a notice that he had been drafted, though he was five years too old for the age cutoff and suspected the intervention of government agents. He moved to Canada, then to Tanzania, where he and his wife Janet lived from 1969 to 1976 and had three of their four children. Moses worked as a math teacher as well as for the Ministry of Education.

== Algebra Project ==
After President Jimmy Carter offered amnesty to draft resisters, Moses returned to the United States and to Harvard, completing doctoral work in philosophy. He began teaching high school math in a public high school in Cambridge, Massachusetts, after learning from his daughter that the school was not offering to teach algebra.

In 1982 Moses received a MacArthur Fellowship. He used the award to create the Algebra Project, devoted to improving minority education in math, starting with his daughter's classroom. Moses also taught math for a time at Lanier High School in Jackson, Mississippi. He used the Lanier classroom as a laboratory school for developing methods and approaches for the Algebra Project, enlisting the support of parents, teachers, and the community in the project.

For Moses, advancement in math literacy was the next phase of the civil rights struggle, guaranteeing the civil right to quality education as the Freedom Summer organizing has fought for the right to vote. "Education is still basically Jim Crow as far as the kids who are in the bottom economic strata of the country," he said in 2013. Moses believed that algebra in particular was a critical "gatekeeper" subject because mastering it was necessary in order for middle school students to advance in math, technology, and science; college was out of reach without it. The Algebra Project takes students who score the lowest on state math tests and aims to prepare them for college-level math by the end of high school by doubling up on math courses for the four years of high school. At Lanier High School in 2006, 55 percent of the students in the Algebra Project's curriculum passed the state exam on the first try, compared to 40 percent of students taught with the regular curriculum. More students at junior high school sites who followed the Algebra Project curriculum scored higher on standardized tests and continued to more advanced math classes than their schoolmates who followed the standard curriculum. Thus, they could better meet requirements for college admission and future entry into good jobs, as opposed to being tracked into low-paying, low-skill work.

Since 1982, Moses expanded the Algebra Project to more schools, developing models that are sustainable and focused on students by building coalitions of stakeholders within the local communities, particularly historically underserved populations. ''I believe that solving the problem requires exactly the kind of community organizing that changed the South in the 1960s'', he told The New York Times in 2001. For example, the Algebra Project developed a cooperating project called Young People's Project, to help engage students in their learning process and their communities: "YPP uses mathematics literacy as a tool to develop young leaders and organizers who radically change the quality of education and quality of life in their communities so that all children have the opportunity to reach their full human potential."

In October 2006, the Algebra Project received an award from the National Science Foundation to improve the development of materials for Algebra I. The organization received another NSF grant in 2016. More than 40,000 students in the US have been taught using the program.

== Continued work in education ==
In 2001, Moses and fellow activist and journalist Charles E. Cobb Jr. published Radical Equations: Civil Rights from Mississippi to the Algebra Project, about Moses's life and work in civil rights and education. The New York Times described it: "If Chapter 1 of Mr. Moses's Mississippi odyssey was about voting, Chapter 2 is about algebra. They merge in his new book ... the themes – equality, empowerment, citizenship – ripple through like ribbons, tying the two experiences in the same long-term struggle."

As of 2006, Moses taught high school math in Jackson, Mississippi, and Miami, Florida. That year, he was named a Frank H. T. Rhodes Class of '56 Professor at Cornell University. As a visiting scholar at Princeton University, he taught an African American Studies class with Professor Tera Hunter in the Spring 2012 semester.

He was identified as a Teaching hero by The My Hero Project.

== Death ==
Moses died on Sunday July 25, 2021. His death was confirmed by Algebra Project staff but no details were provided. His funeral was held at St. Mary of the Assumption Catholic Church in Cambridge.

== Works ==
- Radical Equations—Civil Rights from Mississippi to the Algebra Project (with Charles E. Cobb Jr.) (Beacon Press, 2001) ISBN 0807031275
- Co-editor, Quality Education as a Constitutional Right—Creating a Grassroots Movement to Transform Public Schools (Beacon Press, 2010) ISBN 0807032824

== Legacy and honors ==
- 1982, MacArthur Fellowship
- 1991, Doctor of Humane Letters (Honorary), Hamilton College
- 1997, War Resisters League Peace Award
- 1999, 6th Annual Heinz Award in the Human Condition
- 2001, chapter foundation member, Phi Beta Kappa, University of Mississippi
- 2001, Puffin/Nation Prize for Creative Citizenship
- 2001, Margaret Chase Smith American Democracy Award
- 2001, honorary doctor of humane letters, Grinnell College
- 2002, James Bryant Conant Award
- 2004, honorary doctor of laws, Princeton University
- 2005, Alphonse Fletcher Sr. Fellowship
- 2006, honorary doctor of science, Harvard University
- 2007, John Dewey Prize for Progressive Education
- 2007, honorary degree, Swarthmore College
- 2016, honorary doctor of science, Ohio State University
- 2016, honorary doctor of humane letters, University of Missouri

== See also ==
- List of civil rights leaders
