= McComb High School =

Location
- 310 7th Street; McComb, Mississippi 39648; United States
- Coordinates: 31.244260°N 90.462893°W

Information
- School district: McComb School District
- Principal: Robert Lamkin
- Teaching staff: 42.26 (FTE)
- Grades: 9–12
- Gender: Coed
- Enrollment: 665 (2023-2024)
- Student to teacher ratio: 15.74
- Colors: Green and gold
- Mascot: Tigers
- Website: mhs.mccomb.k12.ms.us

McComb High School is a public school in McComb, Mississippi, United States, serving 740 students in grades 9–12, as of 2017. Most of its students are African American. During segregation, black students attended Burlund High School, now Higgins Middle School. Students who were arrested at protests for civil rights were expelled by then principal Higgins. Brenda Travis returned to her former school in 2006 to thank her supporters and encourage a continued action for civil rights.

Its boundary includes almost all of McComb and almost all of Summit.

== Athletics ==
McComb High School offers multiple sports, including baseball, football, and basketball.

== Notable alumni ==
- Woodie Assaf, weatherman at WLBT television in Jackson from 1953 to 2001, and was reported to be the weatherman with the longest tenure at the same station in U.S. broadcasting history
- Adrian Brown, former MLB player
- Jackie Butler, former NBA player
- Cooper Carlisle, former NFL player
- Perry Carter, former NFL player
- Jarrod Dyson, MLB player
- Bobby Felder, former NFL player
- Louis Guy, former NFL player
- Vasti Jackson, blues musician.
- Abe Mickal, college football All-American
- David Myers, American politician
- Pete Young, former MLB player
- Charvarius Ward, NFL player
- Bobby Lounge, Blues Musician

== Clubs and activities ==
The school offers multiple clubs and activities including Spanish Club, Drama Club, and Art Club.
