= Daryl Porter Jr. (politician) =

American attorney & politician (born 1990)

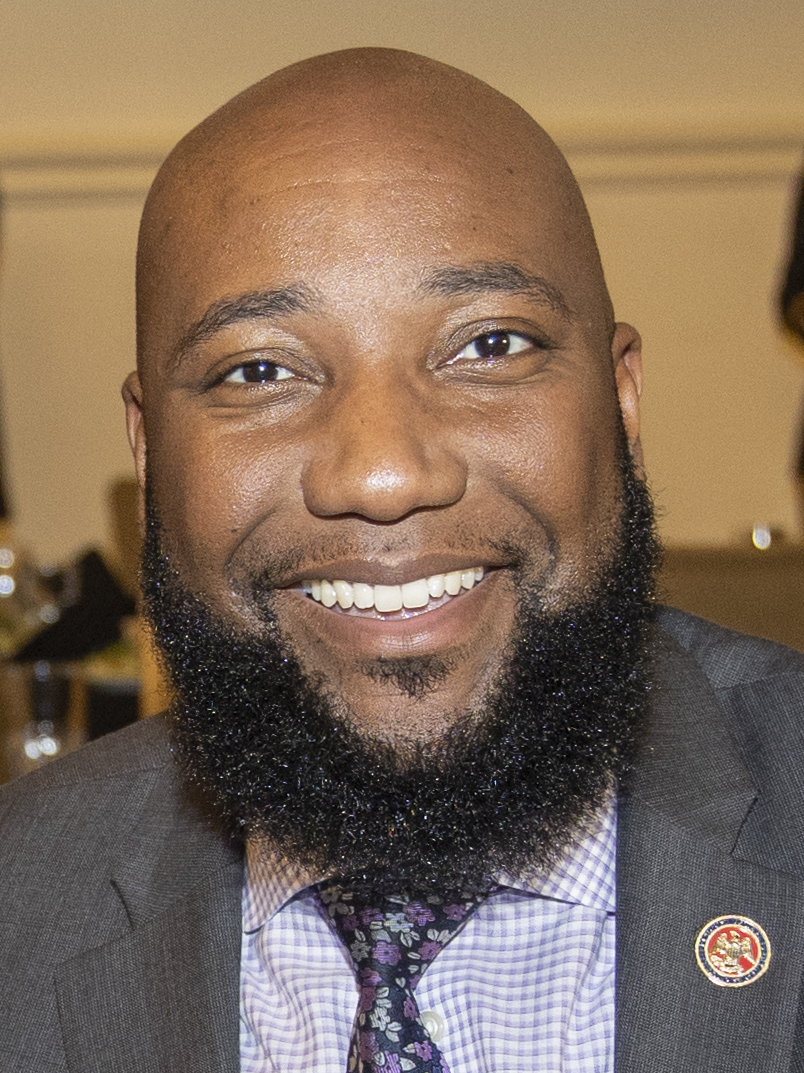

Member of the Mississippi House of Representatives from the 98th district
- Incumbent
- Assumed office January 7, 2020
- Preceded by: David Myers

Personal details
- Born: September 30, 1990 (age 35) McComb, Mississippi, U.S.
- Party: Democratic
- Education: University of Mississippi (BA); Mississippi College (JD)

Daryl Porter Jr. (born September 30, 1990) is an American attorney and politician serving as a member of the Mississippi House of Representatives from the 98th district. He assumed office on January 7, 2020.

== Early life and education ==
Porter was born in McComb, Mississippi. After graduating from McComb High School, he earned a Bachelor of Arts degree in political science from the University of Mississippi and a Juris Doctor from the Mississippi College School of Law.

== Career ==
As a law student, Porter clerked in the office of the Mississippi Attorney General. He has since worked as a personal injury attorney. He was elected to the Mississippi House of Representatives in November 2019 and assumed office on January 7, 2020. Before his election to the House, Porter had served as a member of the Summit, Mississippi Town Council. After his election, Porter sought permission from the attorney general to continue serving on the town council.
