= Curtis Muhammad =

American civil rights activist (1943–2022)

- Born: Curtis Hayes; February 24, 1943; Independence, Louisiana
- Died: February 1, 2022 (aged 78)
- Other names: Curtis Leroy; Curtis Williams
- Occupation: Civil rights activist
- Years active: 1961–2022
- Children: Curtis Williams

Curtis Muhammad (February 24, 1943 – February 1, 2022), born Curtis Hayes, was an American civil rights activist. Muhammad was an organizer in the Student Nonviolent Coordinating Committee (SNCC) from 1961 to 1968 and later moved on to other activist organizations.

== Early life ==
Muhammad was born in 1943 in Independence, Louisiana. Muhammad's father Johnny Williams was already married, but could not have children, so he arranged for Muhammad's mother Mabel to have a baby for him and his wife. The arrangement ended after Muhammad's birth when his grandmother intervened. Muhammad grew up in the Chisholm Mission community near Summit, Mississippi. After a childhood accident, Muhammad received inadequate medical care from a local white doctor which caused him to suffer from debilitating pain throughout his life.

The family had several run-ins with the Ku Klux Klan. Muhammad's cousin was lynched after being accused of raping a white woman. His father Johnny worked as a print setter at the Enterprise-Journal, where the editor was a vocal critic of lynching; however, after exchanging gunfire with Klan members, Johnny was forced to flee to Chicago. Muhammad's grandmother temporarily changed his last name to Leroy to prevent the Klan from finding Muhammad. As a result, Muhammad was 18 when he met his father. Muhammad graduated from Eva H. Harris School in May 1961 and was awarded a scholarship to Jackson State University. On a bus trip during summer 1961, Muhammad saw two Freedom Riders being arrested, which interested him in the movement.

== Activist career ==
After hearing erroneously that A. D. King was in McComb, Mississippi, Muhammad and his friend Hollis Watkins went to a SNCC meeting in July 1961. There they met Bob Moses, the field secretary for the SNCC. Inspired by the organization's workshops on nonviolence, the two men staged a sit-in at the town's Woolworth branch, which led to his arrest. Muhammad's first project after his release was a speaking tour to raise money in the wake of Herbert Lee's murder. After a black student was expelled from Burglund High School for her activism, he returned to McComb to help the students of Burglund High School walk out of the school in protest. Many of the students and activists were beaten and arrested, including Muhammad, Hollis Watkins and Bob Moses. After the violence during the walkout, local community leaders asked the activists to leave town. As a result, both Muhammad and Watkins joined the SNCC as organizers and fieldworkers. In February 1962, the two friends moved temporarily to Hattiesburg, Mississippi to start a voter registration campaign in preparation for the 1963 Mississippi gubernatorial election. Muhammad was arrested again the day of the election when he asked Mayor Charles Durrough of Ruleville, Mississippi to let him monitor the town's polling place. The mayor, who was an opponent of the civil rights movement, had him detained and he was sentenced to 30 days in jail for interfering with the election. Muhammad went to Washington D.C. during the March on Washington, but he chose to demonstrate in front of the Department of Justice with Hollis Watkins instead. On July 8, 1964, Muhammad was injured after Klan members bombed the McComb Freedom House where he was sleeping. Shortly after the bombing, Muhammad traveled to Africa for the first time.

After leaving the SNCC in 1968, Muhammad continued championing civil rights. He protested against racism in Chicago and started an activist bookstore in Washington D.C. In the 1970s, his activism attracted the attention of the FBI's COINTELPRO programs and he changed his name to Curtis Muhammad. He later moved to New Orleans where he worked for the Union of Needletrades, Industrial and Textile Employees and AFL–CIO as an organizer at the grassroots level.

In 1994, Muhammad appeared in the civil rights documentary film Freedom on My Mind.

In 2005, Muhammad founded the People's Fund and the People's Organizing Committee to help New Orleans residents recover from Hurricane Katrina.

== Personal life ==
Muhammad was married several times and had 10 children, including (in birth order): Abdullah Muhammad, Ishmael Muhammad, Sanovia Muhammad (deceased), Ivory Muhammad, Saad Muhammad, Llena Chavis, Jabari, Musa & Afrika Williams his youngest son, and actor Curtis Williams.
