= Oakley Youth Development Center =

Oakley
- Unincorporated community
- Oakley Youth Development Center
- Location within the state of Mississippi
- Coordinates: 32°13′04″N 90°30′11″W
- Country: United States
- State: Mississippi
- County: Hinds
- Elevation: 194 ft (59 m)
- Time zone: UTC-6 (Central (CST))
  - Summer (DST): UTC-5 (CDT)
- ZIP codes: 39154
- Area code: 601
- GNIS feature ID: 675128
- Website: mdhs.state.ms.us/dys_instit.html

Oakley Youth Development Center (OYDC), formerly known as Oakley Training School is a juvenile correctional facility of the Mississippi Department of Human Services located in unincorporated Hinds County, Mississippi, near Raymond. It is the Mississippi state government's sole juvenile correctional facility for children adjudicated into the juvenile correctional system.

Oakley has a capacity of 150 students. Oakley is located on a 1,068-acre (432 ha) plot of land surrounded by agricultural fields; the State of Mississippi states that the complex is about a 30-minute commute from Jackson. Grantier Architecture designed a 6,598 square feet (613.0 m^{2}) building of the school. Only those who have been adjudicated delinquent for a felony or who has been adjudicated delinquent three or more times for a misdemeanor offense may be committed to Oakley. Oakley may retain custody of a child until the child's twentieth birthday but not for longer. The facility is subject to a 2023 Memorandum of Agreement between the United States and Mississippi for care required at the facility.

== History ==
A post office opened at what is now the Oakley Training School in 1837.

Originally Oakley was the Oakley Farm, a prison for women in the State of Mississippi prison system. In 1894 the State of Mississippi purchased a 2,725-acre (1,103 ha) property that became the Oakley Farm, and the state housed all women in the Mississippi penal system in Oakley. A limestone crushing plant opened at Oakley; it became a financial failure. Oakley did not have very good soil, so its farming operations did not do very well. Early in the 20th century the women at Oakley were moved to the Mississippi State Penitentiary (Parchman) in Sunflower County, Mississippi. The Mississippi state prison hospital remained at Oakley. On July 21, 1913 a fire swept through the Oakley Prison Farm and killed thirty-five black prisoners. In 1925, after two white prison camps in the Mississippi penal system faced overcrowding, the state of Mississippi moved seventy-five white prisoners between the ages of 14 and 21 to the Oakley facility, turning it into a juvenile correctional facility. William B. Taylor and Tyler H. Fletcher, authors of "Profits from convict labor: Reality or myth observations in Mississippi: 1907–1934," said that Oakley was "a large and unjustifiable financial drain" until its repurposing as a juvenile facility; they said that Oakley was "a financial drain, though perhaps a more justifiable one."

Later Oakley became the Negro Juvenile Reformatory and the Black Juvenile Reformatory School. Before desegregation Oakley housed Black children of both sexes, while the Columbia Training School housed White children of both sexes; the desegregation plan around the 1970s required the state to house male children 15 and older of all races at Oakley, while males 14 and under and females were housed at Columbia.

In 1999 DYS spent $1,289,700 of U.S. Department of Justice grant money to build a 15-bed maximum security unit for girls at Oakley. Around 2008 the Mississippi Youth Justice Project advocated for the closure of Oakley. Officials from the school responded, saying that the school had made improvements since past scandals.

== Education ==
Williams School is the provider of education, for grades 4-12.

== Notable inmates ==
- Brenda Travis, a student at Burglund High School in McComb, Mississippi was incarcerated at Oakley Training School for participating in civil rights protests.
