= Bess Phipps Dawson =

American painter

- Born: 1916; Tchula, Mississippi, U.S.
- Died: April 15, 1994 (aged 77–78); Jackson, Mississippi, U.S.
- Resting place: Woodlawn Cemetery, Summit, Mississippi, U.S.
- Education: Belhaven College
- Occupation: painter

Bess Phipps Dawson (1916 - April 15, 1994) was an American painter and gallerist. She was a member of the "Summit Trio" in Summit, Mississippi, in the 1960s, and she later owned an art gallery in McComb, Mississippi.

== Early life ==
Bess Phipps Dawson was born in 1916 in Tchula, Mississippi. She graduated from Belhaven College in Jackson, Mississippi. By 1951, she studied at the Southwest Mississippi Junior College in Summit, Mississippi, alongside Halcyone Barnes and Ruth Atkinson Holmes.

== Career ==
Dawson was an abstract painter. In the 1960s, she co-founded the "Summit Trio" alongside Barnes and Atkinson in Summit, Mississippi. The three painters exhibited their work at the High Museum of Art in Atlanta, Georgia, the Memphis Brooks Museum of Art in Memphis, Tennessee, the Delgado Museum of Art in New Orleans, Louisiana, and the Mississippi Museum of Art in Jackson, Mississippi.

By 1971, Dawson moved to McComb, Mississippi, where she was the co-owner of the Gulf/South Gallery alongside Norman Gillis, Jr. She was also the director of the Mainstream Mall in Greenville, Mississippi, where she opened another art gallery in 1972. The dedication of the Greenville gallery included an exhibit of paintings by Marie Hull of Jackson, Mississippi and Marshall Bouldin III of the Lauramar Plantation in Clarksdale, Mississippi.

Dawson served as the president of the Mississippi Art Colony from 1976 to 1989. She was a proponent of art education for schoolchildren.

== Death ==
Dawson died of cancer on April 15, 1994, in Jackson, Mississippi, at age 79, and she was buried at the Woodlawn Cemetery in Summit, Mississippi.
