= Ponton =

Ponton is an alternative spelling of pontoon.

Ponton, Pontón, or de Ponton may also refer to:

== Places ==
- Great Ponton, a village in Lincolnshire, England
- Little Ponton, a village in Lincolnshire, England
- Ponton, Manitoba, Canada
- Ponton Island, an island near Australia

== People ==
=== Ponton ===
- Alexander Ponton (1898–1949), Canadian sprinter
- Lynn Ponton (born 1951), American child and adolescent psychiatrist
- Marnie Ponton (born 1984), Australian long-distance runner
- Mungo Ponton (1801–1880), 19th century Scottish inventor
- Mungo Melanchthon Ponton (born c. 1860), American educator
- Olivia Ponton (born 2002), American model
- Shannan Ponton (born 1973), Australian exercise instructor
- Yvan Ponton (born 1945), Canadian actor, commentator and television host

=== Pontón ===
- Álvaro Fernando Noboa Pontón (born 1950), Ecuadorian politician
- Ana Pontón (born 1977), Spanish politician
- José Antonio Pontón (born 1942), Spanish cyclist
- María Eugenia Cordovez Pontón (1934–2012), Ecuadorian politician

=== de Ponton ===
- Gustave de Ponton d'Amécourt (1825–1888), French inventor, archaeologist, and numismatist
- Jean de Ponton d'Amécourt (born 1945), French diplomat

== Other ==
- Ponton (automobile), a genre of automobile styling, 1930s-1960s
- Mercedes-Benz Ponton, car model line

== See also ==
- Pontoon (disambiguation)
