= Campbell College (Mississippi) =

Private junior college in Mississippi, US

Coordinates: 32.298513°N 90.209448°W

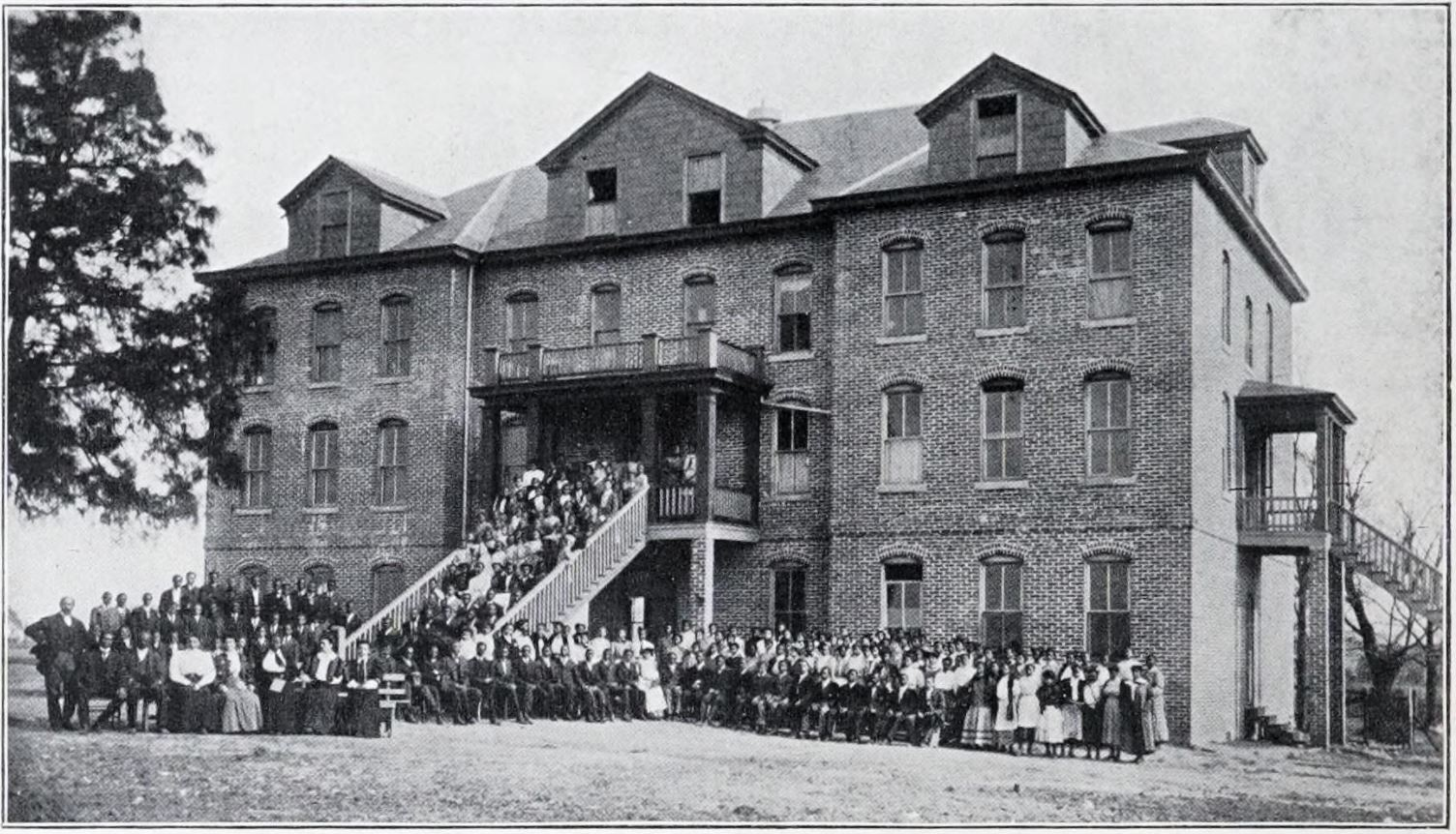
The boys' dormitory, c. 1910

J. P. Campbell College (1890–1964) was a private junior college in Jackson, Mississippi, focused on educating African American students. It was affiliated with the African Methodist Episcopal (A.M.E.) Church. In its final years, the early 1960s, it enrolled three hundred students.

== History ==
Founded in Vicksburg, Mississippi, in 1890, it was relocated to Jackson, Mississippi, in 1898. Perry Wilbon Howard II served as its president from 1899 until 1900. M. M. Ponton became president of the college in 1907.

Sometime after World War II (after 1945), Lampton College of Alexandria, Louisiana (founded as the Delhi Institute of Delhi, Louisiana), an A.M.E. church–affiliated Black school was absorbed in to Campbell College.

On April 8, 1960, Black civil rights activist Medgar Evers announced the Easter boycott of downtown Jackson merchants from a press conference at the college. Charles A. Jones, Campbell College's dean of religion, led the boycott campaign. Robert M. Stevens was then president of the college.

In October 1961, students from Burglund High School marched through downtown McComb in solidarity with Brenda Travis, a fifteen-year-old student who had been arrested and sentenced for participating in a voter registration drive and sit-ins. Around 1,600 students were arrested as they prayed on the steps of City Hall. Berglund's principal required students to sign a pledge to avoid participation in further protests in order to attend school. In response, Campbell College offered Berglund students who refused an opportunity to enroll.

The Mississippi State Sovereignty Commission monitored Campbell College's civil rights activities, placing its president Robert Stevens and dean of religion Charles Jones on its "trouble-makers list." In February 1962, conservative members of the college's board of trustees and the AME Church filed for injunction to remove Stevens, Jones, and other administrators from their duties. The Chancery Court allowed the board of trustees to be reconstituted, but the new board reinstated Steven and Jones four months later. Civil rights activism continued on campus after 1962, but the college and its sponsor the Eighth Episcopal District lost money in the process, as well as in a separate land transaction.

In 1964, the state of Mississippi seized the college by eminent domain. Scholar Jay Ann Williamson wrote that, "Legislators never called it an act of retribution, but Campbell's place in the Jackson movement clearly influenced the decision." Williamson stated that "The demise of Campbell College provides an extreme example of private HBCU Historically Black Colleges and Universities vulnerability to state attempts to quash the Civil Rights Movement." After its seizure, the physical site was absorbed by neighboring Jackson State College (now Jackson State University).
