= Parklane Academy =

Segregation academy in Mississippi

Location
- 1115 Parklane Rd; McComb, Mississippi 39648; United States; 31°14′4″N 90°28′29″W

Information
- Type: Private
- Motto: Excellence In Christian Education
- Established: 1970
- Grades: K-12th
- Colors: Red, White, Blue
- Athletics: Football, Basketball, Baseball, Track, Soccer, Fast Pitch Softball, Tennis, Swim Team, Golf
- Athletics conference: MAIS
- Mascot: Pioneers
- Website: www.parklaneacademy.net

Parklane Academy is a private K-12 Protestant school located in McComb, Mississippi. It was founded in 1970 as a segregation academy. Parklane Academy is a member of the Mississippi Association of Independent Schools (MAIS). As of 2025, the elementary school principal is Sara Delong, the high school principal is Jill Jackson, and the superintendent is Jack Henderson.

== History ==
The school was founded in 1970 in reaction to the desegregation of the McComb, Mississippi public schooling system (McComb School District). Originally new students were required to have the sponsorship of two families whose children attended the academy and no black students were invited. Asked about the lack of African-American students in 1994 Kathy Miller, administrative assistant at Parklane, told the Austin American-Statesman that "[w]e have a couple of black students. Well, we have a couple of students named Black."

By 2002 Parklane had tax-exempt status and therefore, according to school official Billy Swindle, followed a required non-discrimination policy. In a city that was 58.40% African-American as of the 2000 census, no African-American children had attended Parklane Academy as of 2005. However, according to Swindle, "Parklane does have some Asian pupils [in 2002]" noted that "its annual tuition of $2,600 could be an impediment."

On September 25, 2023, a fire destroyed the physical education gym, including the weight room and three classrooms. A replacement building opened on October 23, 2025.

== Athletics ==
In 2001 The Mississippi Private School Association (MPSA) allowed member schools to participate in athletic matches against public schools. The Mississippi High School Athletic Association requires that their member schools only play schools which meet accreditation standards set by the Southern Association of Colleges and Schools (SACS). Sixty nine of the MPSA's member schools, among them Parklane Academy, failed to meet SACS standards at that time. A Parklane School administrator stated that "Parklane has no plans to compete against public schools in athletics. In my opinion, not many of the private schools will. It's strictly a choice between the two schools involved. It's an autonomy question. Each school has to decide on their own." By the 21st century Parklane Academy had made strides in racial diversity. In 2022, Parklane Academy hired an African-American teacher and coach.

== Notable alumni ==
- Jeff Calhoun, former Major League Baseball pitcher
- Paul Ott Carruth, former running back for the Green Bay Packers and the University of Alabama.
- Ted Jackson, photojournalist
- William W. Parsons, Center Director, John F. Kennedy Space Center
- Britney Spears attended Parklane until ninth grade
- Bryan Spears, Film producer
- Jamie Lynn Spears completed tenth grade at Parklane
