= Ruth Holmes =

Ruth Holmes may refer to:

- Ruth Langsford, also Holmes, Singapore-born English television presenter
- Ruth Atkinson Holmes, American painter and philanthropist
- Ruth Bradley Holmes, American linguist, educator, and polyglot
