= Ted Jackson =

American journalist (born 1956)

Ted M. Jackson (born 1956) is an American photojournalist, writer and public speaker who has spent over three decades exploring the human condition while covering news, sports and features for the Times-Picayune in New Orleans, Louisiana. He contributes to the newspaper’s extensive gallery of photographs of the Greater New Orleans Area.

== Achievements prior to 2005 ==
Jackson graduated high school at McComb's Parklane Academy in 1974 and proceeded in his education to Southwest Mississippi Community College and University of Southern Mississippi. After graduation he worked for 2 years with the Daily Iberian in New Iberia, Louisiana, and then joined TheTimes-Picayune in 1984.

Among other awards, Jackson received the 2003 Community Photojournalism award from the American Society of News Editors (ASNE). After a stint as correspondent during the 1990s U.S. intervention into Haiti, Jackson in 1997 shared a Sigma Delta Chi Award and a Pulitzer Prize for his photographic work on Oceans of Trouble, a documentary about the world's troubled fisheries.

== Hurricane Katrina ==
Jackson gained attention for his work during and after Hurricane Katrina in 2005, a natural disaster that presented him with many moral and ethical dilemmas. Many of his photographs appeared in the 2006 Times-Picayune book Katrina: The Ruin and Recovery of New Orleans.

== Personal life ==
Jackson's photographic work during and after Katrina and his knowledge of the affected areas were critical to relief workers, including those who came to work with his own (Mandeville, Louisiana) Tammany Oaks Church of Christ with which he served as an elder. Jackson is married to Nancy Jackson, and they have two grown sons—Christopher Jackson and Jeremiah Jackson. Ted and Nancy Jackson live in Covington, Louisiana. Jackson is also the author of You Ought To Do A Story About Me, a biography of former football player Jackie Wallace and his struggle with addiction.
