= Pontons =

Pontons could refer to:

- Pontons, Spain, a municipality in Catalonia, Spain
- Alex Pontons (born 1991), Bolivian footballer
- Pablo Pontons (1630–1691), Spanish painter

== See also ==
- Ponton (disambiguation)
