= Yvonne Brown =

American politician (1952–2012)

Mayor of Tchula, Mississippi
- In office 2001–2009
- Preceded by: Frances Wilkes
- Succeeded by: Sharkey Ford

Personal details
- Born: Yvonne L. Rayford; September 8, 1952 Chicago, Illinois
- Died: April 23, 2012 (aged 59) Tchula, Mississippi
- Party: Republican
- Occupation: Mayor

Yvonne L. Rayford Brown (September 8, 1952 – April 23, 2012) was an American politician and member of the Republican Party from the state of Mississippi. She was elected as Mayor of Tchula, serving two terms from 2001 to 2009. This small town is in Holmes County on the eastern edge of the Mississippi Delta. She was also the Republican nominee for Mississippi's 2nd congressional district in the United States House of Representatives in the 2006 mid-term elections.

She was notable for being the first female black Republican mayor in the state of Mississippi and the first in the entire United States, according to several sources.

== Early life ==
Yvonne L. Rayford was born in 1952 in Chicago, Illinois to Hilda and Bennie Rayford. She had sisters LaVonne "Pye" and Gail Rayford. The family moved to Toledo, Ohio, where her parents worked as teachers in the Toledo public school system. After she graduated from Rogers High School, the family moved back to her parents' native Mississippi. Her father had been active in the Democratic Party and worked as a local co-ordinator for Jesse Jackson's 1984 presidential campaign.

He was not well received by local Democrats when he returned to Mississippi and changed parties, becoming a Republican. Yvonne also became a Republican. Yvonne Rayford first married Russell Barnett. Later they divorced.

== Career ==
Barnett worked for Monroe Auto Equipment in Monroe County, Mississippi, Irvin Automotive in Greenwood and Pharmacy Corporation of America. She moved to Tchula in 1995, where she married again to Robert Brown.

She and her husband lived in an abandoned grocery store, which was used partly as a meeting space for her husband's ministry. Together they co-founded the Grace Community Church in Tchula. Yvonne Brown became involved in politics by being part of a "ministerial duo" with her husband, leading efforts to rehabilitate homes, conduct Bible clubs in back yards, volunteer at a food bank, minister to the elderly, and hold free classes and clinics.

In June 2001, Yvonne Rayford Brown was the Republican nominee for Mayor of Tchula, a black-majority town that is 99% Democratic. She won the election, defeating the Democratic incumbent and receiving national media attention as the first female black Republican mayor in the United States. As mayor, she won a stimulus package grant of $5 million from Washington for her town which she used, in part, to build a municipal complex. She also used federal funding for water, sewer and street construction and built or improved recreational facilities. As mayor, she earned a salary of $6,000 per year. She served as a delegate to the Republican National Convention in 2004 and was re-elected mayor in 2005.

Brown was the Republican nominee for Mississippi's 2nd congressional district in the United States House of Representatives in the 2006 mid-term elections. She was unopposed in the Republican primary and faced Democratic incumbent Bennie Thompson in the general election, losing to the longtime congressman by 100,160 votes (64.27%) to 55,672 (35.73%).

== Death ==
After leaving office in 2009, Brown worked as the Lowndes County Director of the Mississippi Department of Human Services. She was diagnosed with cancer in February 2011 and resigned a few months later. She died in April 2012, aged 59. She was survived by her mother (her father died in 2010), her sisters LaVonne "Pye" Rayford Chestang and Gail Rayford Ambeau, and her daughters Nichole and Aliya Barnett.
