= Mississippi Department of Child Protective Services =

Mississippi Department of Child Protection Services
- Interactive map of the Mississippi Department of Child Protection Services area

General information
- Status: Completed
- Location: 750 North State St. Jackson, MS 39702, United States
- Coordinates: 32°18′29″N 90°10′41″W

Mississippi Department of Child Protective Services (MDCPS) is a state agency of Mississippi. It includes foster care services.

== History ==
The Mississippi Department of Child Protection Services was created in 2016 by Mississippi Legislature. This separated it from the Mississippi Department of Human Services. Mississippi Senate Bill 2179 was signed by Governor Phil Bryant in May 2016. MDCPS is an independent agency with its commissioner joining the Governor's cabinet. Due to an increase in state funding, MDCPS has been able to better meet the needs of families and children of Mississippi by increasing the amount of social workers and upgrading its existing infrastructure.

=== Olivia Y. Lawsuit ===
Civil Action No.3:04CV251LN

In March 2004, Olivia Y. filed a lawsuit against the MDCPS alleging that the foster care system in Mississippi was not properly protecting those in its care and allowing constitutional violations to take place. The lawsuit did not seek monetary damages and was purely for systematic court ordered changes.

There was a court order circa 2008 on how MDCPS is supposed to manage its operations; according to documents from the Olivia Y. vs. Bryant case circa 2019, 37 of 113 requirements were being followed by MDCPS.
