= Bobby Felder =

American gridiron football player (born 1990)

No. 31, 39
- Position: Cornerback

Personal information
- Born: September 23, 1990 (age 36); McComb, Mississippi, U.S.
- Listed height: 6 ft 1 in (1.85 m)
- Listed weight: 200 lb (91 kg)

Career information
- High school: McComb (MS)
- College: Nicholls State
- NFL draft: 2012: undrafted

Career history
- Minnesota Vikings (2012–2013); Tampa Bay Buccaneers (2013); Buffalo Bills (2014)*; Hamilton Tiger-Cats (2015); Orlando Predators (2016)*
- * Offseason or practice squad member only
- Stats at Pro Football Reference

Bobby Felder (born September 23, 1990) is an American former professional football cornerback. He signed with the Vikings after going undrafted in the 2012 NFL draft.

== Early life ==
Felder attended McComb High School in McComb, Mississippi.

== College career ==
Felder enrolled at Nicholls State University after receiving scholarship offers from at least two other schools. He cited fellow NFL cornerback and Nicholls State alum Ladarius Webb as one of the reasons for choosing Nicholls State.

Felder had 11 career interceptions in college.

== Professional career ==
Felder went undrafted and subsequently signed with the Minnesota Vikings on May 1, 2012. He was waived by the team on August 31, 2012, and signed to the Vikings practice squad the next day. After re-signing with the team on January 7, 2013, Felder was put on the injured reserve list of the Minnesota Vikings on August 31, 2013, as the team trimmed its players to a 53-man roster.

Tampa Bay Buccaneers claimed Bobby Felder off waivers from the Vikings on October 29, 2013.

He was signed by the Buffalo Bills but waived on Sept 3rd, 2014.

On January 12, 2016, Felder was assigned to the Orlando Predators of the Arena Football League (AFL). On March 22, 2016, Felder was placed on recallable reassignment.
