= David Myers (Mississippi politician) =

American politician (born 1961)

Member of the Mississippi House of Representatives from the 98th district
- In office 1996 – January 7, 2020
- Succeeded by: Daryl Porter Jr.

Personal details
- Born: December 31, 1961 (age 64) McComb, Mississippi, U.S.
- Party: Democratic
- Profession: Independent contractor

David W. Myers (born December 31, 1961) is an American politician who served as a member of the Mississippi House of Representatives from the 98th District (Pike County, Mississippi and Walthall County, Mississippi). Elected in 1995, he served until 2020.

After graduating from McComb High School, Myers attended junior colleges and eventually received his bachelor's degree from the University of Phoenix. He is a member of Alpha Phi Alpha fraternity.
