= Halcyone Barnes =

American artist

Halcyone Drennan Barnes
- Born: Halcyone Freed; March 31, 1913; Dallas, Texas, U.S.
- Died: April 9, 1988; Summit, Mississippi, U.S.
- Resting place: Woodlawn Cemetery, Summit, Mississippi, U.S.
- Occupation: Artist
- Spouse: Joe Barnes

Halcyone Barnes (March 31, 1913 – April 9, 1988) was an American collage artist and watercolor painter.

== Life ==
Barnes was born on March 31, 1913, in Dallas, Texas.

Barnes became a collage artist and watercolor painter. In the 1960s, she exhibited her artwork with Bess Phipps Dawson and Ruth Atkinson Holmes; the three women artists became known as the "Summit Trio". The three housewives were trained by Roy Schultz at Summit Junior College.

Barnes married Joe Barnes. She died on April 9, 1988, in Summit, at age 75, and she was buried in Woodlawn Cemetery.
