= Cooper Carlisle =

American football player (born 1977)

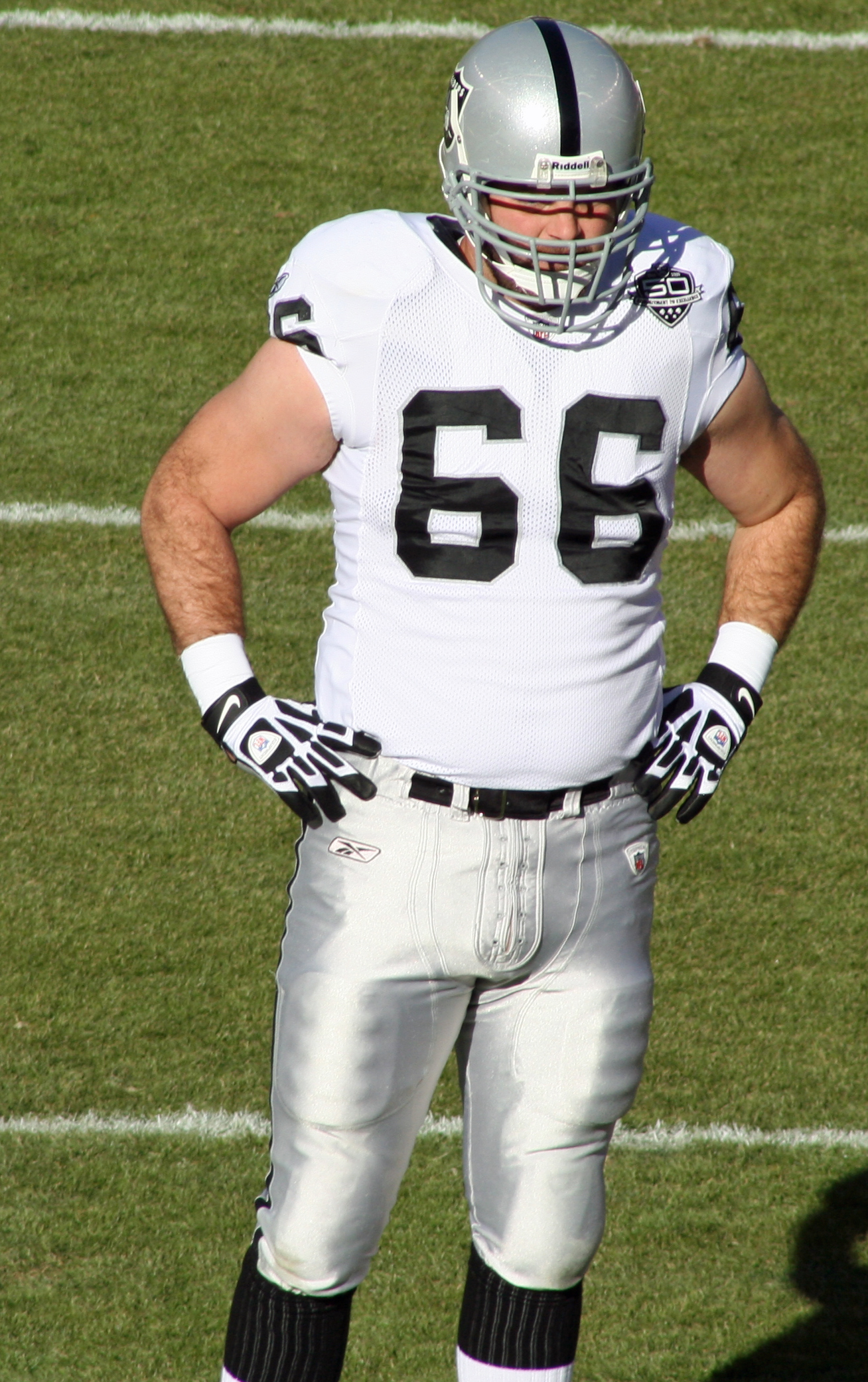
- Carlisle with the Oakland Raiders in 2009

No. 65, 66
- Position: Guard

Personal information
- Born: August 11, 1977 (age 49); Greenville, Mississippi, U.S.
- Listed height: 6 ft 5 in (1.96 m)
- Listed weight: 310 lb (141 kg)

Career information
- High school: McComb (MS)
- College: Florida (1995–1999)
- NFL draft: 2000: 4th round, 113th overall pick

Career history
- Denver Broncos (2000–2006); Oakland Raiders (2007–2012)

Awards and highlights
- Bowl Alliance national champion (1996); First-team All-SEC (1999)

Career NFL statistics
- Games played: 190
- Games started: 133
- Fumble recoveries: 11
- Stats at Pro Football Reference

Cooper Morrison Carlisle (born August 11, 1977) is an American former professional football player who was a guard for 13 seasons in the National Football League (NFL). Carlisle played college football for the Florida Gators, where he was a member of a national championship team. He was selected by the Denver Broncos in the fourth round of the 2000 NFL draft. He played for the Broncos and Oakland Raiders of the NFL.

== Early life ==
Carlisle was born in Greenville, Mississippi, in 1977. He attended McComb High School in McComb, Mississippi, and played for the McComb Tigers high school football team. Carlisle graduated from McComb in 1995 and, according to the Enterprise Journal, was the most sought-after college football recruit that year. He was a first-team Mississippi all-state selection as a senior, and received high school All-America honors from Blue Chip Illustrated and USA Today.

== College career ==
Carlisle accepted an athletic scholarship to attend the University of Florida in Gainesville, Florida, where he played for coach Steve Spurrier's Gators teams from 1996 to 1999. The Gators coaching staff red-shirted Carlisle in 1995, but he was a letterman on the 1996 Gators' Bowl Alliance national championship team that defeated the Florida State Seminoles 52–20 in the Sugar Bowl. As a senior in 1999, he was a team captain and a first-team All-Southeastern Conference (SEC) selection. Carlisle was recognized as an SEC Academic Honor Roll honoree all four years, and graduated from Florida with a bachelor's degree in finance in 1999.

== Professional career ==
=== Denver Broncos ===
The Denver Broncos selected Carlisle in the fourth round (113th pick overall) in the 2000 NFL draft, and he played for the Broncos for seven seasons from 2000 to 2006. Carlisle became a regular starter in 2005, and started in his last thirty regular season games for the Broncos.

=== Oakland Raiders ===
Carlisle signed with the Oakland Raiders as a restricted free agent on April 23, 2007, and remained a regular starter at right guard for the Raiders since the 2007 season, replacing Kevin Boothe from the previous season. From 2007 to 2011, Carlisle missed a start in only one game (in 2008). During the 2010 season, he helped the Raiders achieve their best record since 2002, playing between Samson Satele at center (15 games) and Langston Walker at right tackle (15 games). During the 2011 season, he started all sixteen regular season games. The Raiders released him on March 14, 2012, but re-signed him five days later.

== See also ==
- Florida Gators football, 1990–99
- History of the Denver Broncos
- History of the Oakland Raiders
- List of Florida Gators in the NFL draft
- List of University of Florida alumni
