= Hollis Watkins =

American civil rights activist (1941–2023)

Hollis Watkins (July 29, 1941 – September 20, 2023) was an American activist who was part of the Civil Rights Movement activities in the state of Mississippi during the 1960s. He became a member and organizer with the Student Nonviolent Coordinating Committee (SNCC) in 1961, was a county organizer for 1964's "Freedom Summer", and assisted the efforts of the Mississippi Freedom Democratic Party to unseat the regular Mississippi delegation from their chairs at the 1964 Democratic Party national convention in Atlantic City. He founded Southern Echo, a group that gives support to other grass-roots organizations in Mississippi. He also was a founder of the Mississippi Veterans of the Civil Rights Movement.

== Early life ==
Watkins was born on July 29, 1941, in Lincoln County, Mississippi, USA, near the town of Summit. He was the youngest and twelfth child of sharecroppers John and Lena Watkins. His family purchased a farm about 1949, via a loan program started under President Franklin D. Roosevelt's New Deal. Watkins graduated from the segregated Lincoln County Training School in 1960. He was also a student at Tougaloo College. Tougaloo's commitment to the freedom movement was rare, as it was one of the few all-black colleges that allowed any type of political activity; this was largely because it was one of the only all-black schools at that time that wasn't run by a white segregationist. Watkins was part of the Work-Study Program at Tougaloo, which allowed students to be active in the movement while still earning credits towards a degree.

During his youth Watkins attended National Association for the Advancement of Colored People (NAACP) youth meetings led by Medgar Evers. In 1961 Watkins met Bob Moses who was organizing in Mississippi for the Student Nonviolent Coordinating Committee (SNCC). Watkins was asked by Bob Moses to join the Voter Registration Organization effort in McComb. Watkins became involved the next day. He joined SNCC, and began canvassing potential voters around McComb, Mississippi in Amite County. He soon became a mentor and role model for McComb High School activists. He participated in McComb's first sit-in at a Woolworth's lunch counter in an attempt to achieve integration, for which he was jailed for 34 days. During his time in jail, he was threatened on several occasions, including once being shown a noose and told that he would be hung that night. He kept his decision to participate in the sit-in a secret from his parents knowing they wouldn't allow him to do so, but when his father found out he spoke at a mass meeting protesting their arrest. This support helped encourage Watkins during his difficult time in jail.

Afterwards he took part in a walk-out at McComb's coloured high school, along with dozens of other activists including Brenda Travis, which resulted in his being sentenced to 39 more days in jail. Watkins' activism also had a personal price. Many of his extended family ostracized him and would not recognize him in public for fear of losing their jobs; the White Citizens Council and other groups conducted economic boycotts against activist blacks, getting them fired, evicted from rental properties, and refusing loans and credit.

== Early career ==
Vernon Dahmer, president of the Forrest County, Mississippi NAACP asked SNCC for help with voter registration, and Watkins moved to Hattiesburg, Mississippi to help with that project. Watkins worked half days at Dahmer's sawmill to pay his way and spent the rest of the time organizing voter registration projects. He was rebuffed from efforts to meet at Hattiesburg's Baptist churches but had success at the St. James Colored Methodist Episcopal Church. His first effort led to six people volunteering to try and register, including Victoria Gray Adams. At the request of Amzie Moore, he next went to Holmes County, Mississippi, where he began to canvass potential voters. He was willing to risk his life for this movement, for instance, one day he went to a shack on a plantation to talk to them about voting but ended up being chased away and shot at by the plantation owner, however, that didn't stop him from going back the next week.

Supplied with equipment by CBS News, Watkins went to the clerk of court's office with a hidden camera and microphone in order to film a typical encounter with voter registration officer Theron Lynd. CBS News was covering the movement. The footage of Lynd and some of Watkins was aired as a "CBS Reports" program called "Mississippi and the Fifteenth Amendment." It has since been re-released on DVD as "Mississippi and the Black Vote."

Watkins was with Hartman Turnbow and others when Turnbow tried to register to vote at the Holmes County Courthouse. That night there was a firebomb attack on Turnbow's home. Turnbow was later accused by the sheriff of setting fire to his own house, and he, Watkins and other SNCC workers were arrested. It was during one of his jail terms that Watkins became noted as a leader and singer of "freedom songs." Watkins led freedom songs with Lawrence Guyot. These songs provided people with joy, spirit, and honesty. It was a way to lift people's spirits and provide a sense of comfort.

Watkins was involved in voter registration in many ways. After becoming a SNCC field secretary he went to Hattiesburg and set up a three-month voter registration project with a budget of only 50 dollars. Watkins also went on to do movement work in Greenwood, Mississippi and other locations, working with Sam Block, Willie Peacock, Annell Ponder, John Ball and others. In addition to voter registration projects, Watkins taught voter education and basic literacy classes. In the early 1960s, Watkins attended Highlander Folk School in Tennessee, a school which trained grassroots organizers. Later he served as a member of the board. He was in Washington D.C. at the time of the 1963 March on Washington for Jobs and Freedom, but did not participate in the march. Instead, he, Bob Moses, and Curtis Hayes picketed the Department of Justice. While in Washington, Watkins met and talked with Malcolm X, leader of the Nation of Islam.

Black people were constantly denied the right to vote. Watkins played an active role in trying to fix that. It was legal for African Americans to vote but they were denied the ability to vote because of their lack of education. The government purposefully set up required questions they knew the majority of black people could not answer. This led to Freedom Summers, set up by COFO (Council of Federal Organizations). The Freedom Summers set up freedom schools and community education centers for black citizens to teach them how to read and write. He gathered 750 people in the Greenwood area who would provide homes, food, protection, and support for the group of students coming from the north who were a part of the freedom summers.

External videos
- “Eyes on the Prize; Interview with Hollis Watkins” conducted in 1985 for the Eyes on the Prize documentary in which Watkins discusses the Student Nonviolent Coordinating Committee (SNCC) and activism in Mississippi, including SNCC activity in McComb, Mississippi and Fannie Lou Hamer.

Watkins strongly believed in the power of local activism and control, which was the major reason for his opposition to 1964's 'Summer Project' also known as Freedom Summer. He thought that bringing in outsiders would disrupt the growth of the grassroots programs that were already in place and that after the volunteers left, it would be harder to get the local movements moving again. Once the project was agreed upon, however, Watkins did his best to make it succeed. He and other SNCC members trained participants at Miami University of Ohio. After blocking efforts by Stokely Carmichael to appoint a new arrival over him, he served as director of the Holmes County efforts. More than 50 volunteers moved to Holmes to canvass voters and to operate the freedom schools. For their safety he insisted they follow a set of strict rules, including no drinking, no dating locals, and no arguments with local segregationists. Perhaps because of these rules, Holmes County was relatively free of incidents that summer. The community came to depend on the group from the north during freedom summer. They were educated and spoke well so people listened to them, but when they left everything became scattered and they had to pick up the pieces.

Watkins was one of many people spied upon by the Mississippi State Sovereignty Commission, a tax-supported agency ostensibly formed to support the state image. Its staff and informers investigated civil rights workers and created files on them for government use, as well as passing material to local White Citizens Councils for reprisals against activists. Watkins’ name appears in the files 63 times. Some of the reports refer to him as a communist, although he had little idea what that even meant at the time. In 1990, the state government made these papers accessible to public viewing.

Watkins travelled to Atlantic City, New Jersey, for the 1964 Democratic National Convention in support of the Mississippi Freedom Democratic Party; it attempted to unseat the regular Mississippi Democratic Party (which was white-dominated and maintained disenfranchisement of blacks) as the true representatives of state residents. He was present when Fannie Lou Hamer gave her testimony to the credentials committee, and later when Hamer argued with Martin Luther King over whether the MFDP should accept the compromise of the two seats at the convention offered by President Lyndon Baines Johnson. His efforts on behalf of the party led Victoria Gray to announce her candidacy for the U.S. Senate from Mississippi under the MFDP banner.

== Later work ==
In 1988, Watkins returned to the Democratic Party National Convention, this time as a delegate for Jesse Jackson. Beginning in 1989 Watkins joined, and served as President of Southern Echo, a group dedicated to providing assistance to civil rights and education-reform groups throughout the south. He was also among the founders of the Mississippi Veterans of the Civil Rights Movement, which has worked to educate people about the movement and celebrate its work.

== Death ==
Hollis Watkins died on September 20, 2023, at the age of 82.

== Honors ==
- In 2011 Watkins was honored by Jackson State University with a Fannie Lou Hamer Humanitarian Award.
- On February 27, 2014, the acting mayor, Charles H. Tillman, and the City of Jackson Council honored Watkins with a resolution in City Hall chambers for his work on commemorating the Fiftieth Anniversary of Freedom Summer.
- According to Watkins the most empowering thing is for people to feel a part of mobilizing and not being isolated, which motivates them to get things done. It very important to have community and unity, because it is empowering to help people overcome fear that is deep down. He stated that you should not to allow fear to keep you from doing things. You are expanding the workforce when you feel empowered. People need to accept each other's differences, which will help overcome this massive burden and we can use this to build a massive movement.
