= 2006 United States House of Representatives elections in Mississippi =

- November 7, 2006

All 4 Mississippi seats to the United States House of Representatives
	Majority party	Minority party
Party	Republican	Democratic
Last election	2	2
Seats won	2	2
Seat change	Steady	Steady
Popular vote	304,308	260,330
Percentage	50.66%	43.34%
Swing	▼8.34%	▲13.22%

Republican
40–50%
50–60%
60–70%
70–80%
80–90%
Democratic
50–60%
60–70%
70–80%
80–90%
Independent
40–50%

The Mississippi U.S. House elections took place on November 7, 2006. All 4 House seats for Mississippi were up for election with all incumbents (2 Republicans and 2 Democrats) running for re-election. All incumbents succeeded in being re-elected.

== Overview ==
United States House of Representatives elections in Mississippi, 2006
Party	Votes	Percentage	Seats	+/–
Republican	304,308	50.66%	2	Steady
Democratic	260,330	43.34%	2	Steady
Independents	25,999	4.33%	0	Steady
Reform	10,060	1.67%	0	Steady
Totals	600,697	100.00%	4	Steady

== District 1 ==
2006 Mississippi's 1st congressional district election

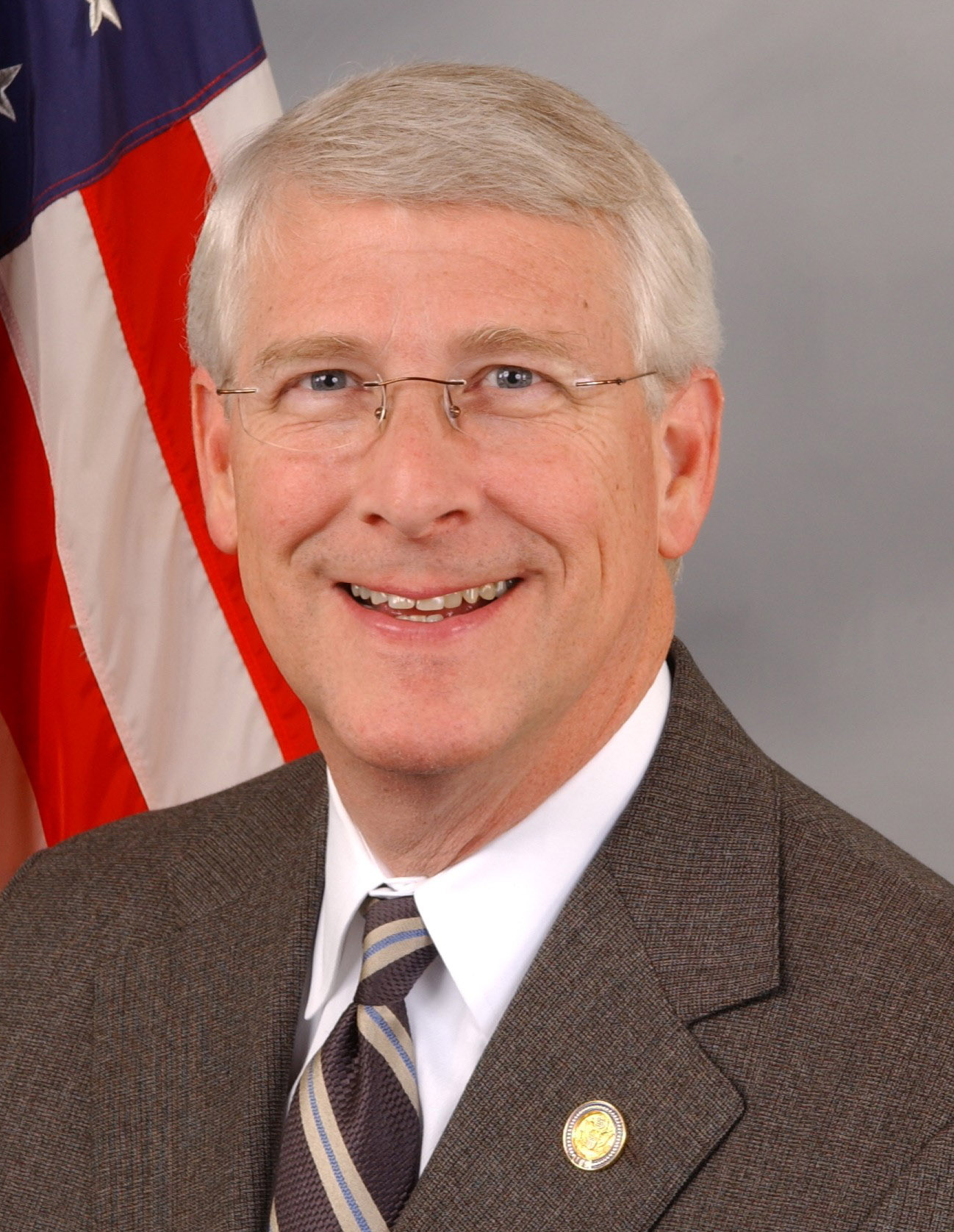

Nominee	Roger Wicker	Ken Hurt
Party	Republican	Democratic
Popular vote	95,098	49,174
Percentage	65.92%	34.08%
- County results Wicker: 50–60% 60–70% 70–80% Hurt: 50–60%
U.S. Representative before election
Roger Wicker
Republican
Elected U.S. Representative
Roger Wicker
Republican

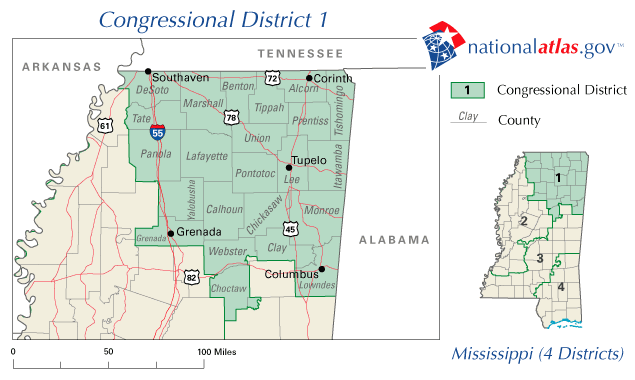

Incumbent Roger Wicker (R) faced political consultant Ken Hurt (D). Wicker has represented the conservative northern Mississippi district since 1995 and has been easily re-elected since. Hurt won a plurality in the Democratic Primary on June 7, but since he did not win over 50% of the vote, he was forced into a run-off with Bill Bambach, the second highest vote winner.

=== Predictions ===
Source	Ranking	As of
The Cook Political Report	Safe R	November 6, 2006
Rothenberg	Safe R	November 6, 2006
Sabato's Crystal Ball	Safe R	November 6, 2006
Real Clear Politics	Safe R	November 7, 2006
CQ Politics	Safe R	November 7, 2006

=== Results ===
2006 Mississippi's 1st congressional district election
Party	Candidate	Votes	%
Republican	Roger Wicker (incumbent)	95,098	65.92
Democratic	Ken Hurt	49,174	34.08
Total votes		144,272	100.00
Republican hold			

==== By county ====
County	Roger Wicker Republican		Ken Hurt Democratic		Margin		Total
County	#	%	#	%	#	%	Total
Alcorn	5,106	66.43%	2,580	33.57%	2,526	32.86%	7,686
Benton	1,045	50.51%	1,024	49.49%	21	1.01%	2,069
Calhoun	1,984	68.96%	893	31.04%	1,091	37.92%	2,877
Chickasaw	1,921	53.04%	1,701	46.96%	220	6.07%	3,622
Choctaw	1,515	68.34%	702	31.66%	813	36.67%	2,217
Clay	3,084	53.14%	2,720	46.86%	364	6.27%	5,804
DeSoto	14,209	75.04%	4,727	24.96%	9,482	50.07%	18,936
Grenada	3,434	64.59%	1,883	35.41%	1,551	29.17%	5,317
Itawamba	3,234	71.56%	1,285	28.44%	1,949	43.13%	4,519
Lafayette	4,576	62.38%	2,760	37.62%	1,816	24.75%	7,336
Lee	9,063	69.16%	4,041	30.84%	5,022	38.32%	13,104
Lowndes	8,855	67.26%	4,310	32.74%	4,545	34.52%	13,165
Marshall	3,471	46.77%	3,951	53.23%	-480	-6.47%	7,422
Monroe	4,544	63.38%	2,625	36.62%	1,919	26.77%	7,169
Panola	3,697	56.06%	2,898	43.94%	799	12.12%	6,595
Pontotoc	4,431	79.03%	1,176	20.97%	3,255	58.05%	5,607
Prentiss	4,120	69.89%	1,775	30.11%	2,345	39.78%	5,895
Tate	3,453	64.19%	1,926	35.81%	1,527	28.39%	5,379
Tippah	3,460	70.37%	1,457	29.63%	2,003	40.74%	4,917
Tishomingo	2,649	61.89%	1,631	38.11%	1,018	23.79%	4,280
Union	3,502	73.46%	1,265	26.54%	2,237	46.93%	4,767
Webster (part)	2,008	78.22%	559	21.78%	1,449	56.45%	2,567
Winston (part)	29	72.50%	11	27.50%	18	45.00%	40
Yalobusha	1,708	57.28%	1,274	42.72%	434	14.55%	2,982
Totals	95,098	65.92%	49,174	34.08%	45,924	31.83%	144,272

== District 2 ==
2006 Mississippi's 2nd congressional district election

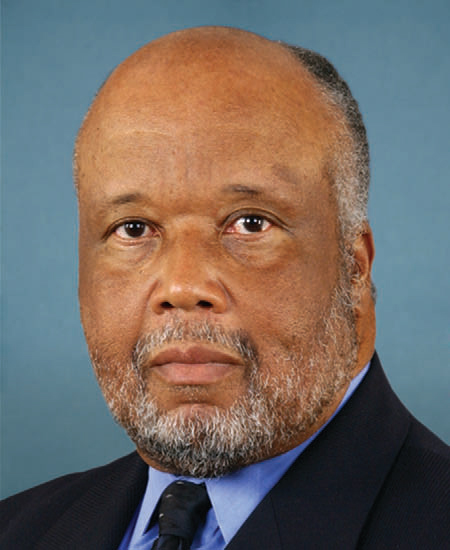

Nominee	Bennie Thompson	Yvonne Brown
Party	Democratic	Republican
Popular vote	100,160	55,672
Percentage	64.27%	35.73%
- Thompson: 50–60% 60–70% 70–80% 80–90% Brown: 50–60%
U.S. Representative before election
Bennie Thompson
Democratic
Elected U.S. Representative
Bennie Thompson
Democratic

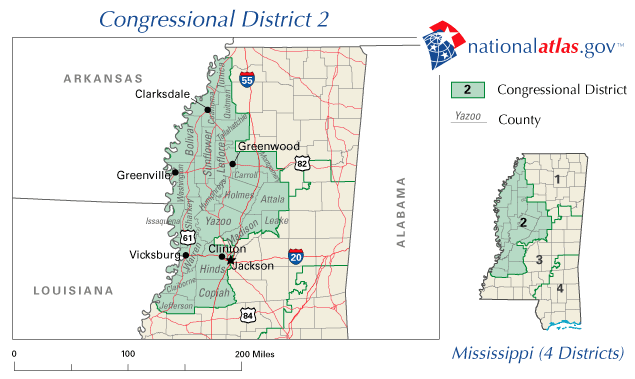

Congressman Bennie Thompson (D) competed against Tchula mayor Yvonne Brown (R). The Democratic-leaning majority-black district comprises the Mississippi Delta and Jackson, the capital and largest city in Mississippi. Thompson first won in a special election in 1993 caused by then-Representative Mike Espy resigning to become Secretary of Agriculture under President Clinton. The congressman had generally easy elections except in 2002 when Republican and political newcomer Clinton LeSueur won 44% of the vote. And in that race state representative Chuck Espy (nephew of Mike Espy) competed against Thompson for the Democratic nomination, though Thompson won with 65% to Espy's 35%.

Yvonne Brown was nominated by the Republicans without any primary opposition. She was elected mayor of the small Delta town of Tchula in 2001 and re-elected in 2005, which is notable in that she is a black Republican in a very Democratic area.

=== Predictions ===
Source	Ranking	As of
The Cook Political Report	Safe D	November 6, 2006
Rothenberg	Safe D	November 6, 2006
Sabato's Crystal Ball	Safe D	November 6, 2006
Real Clear Politics	Safe D	November 7, 2006
CQ Politics	Safe D	November 7, 2006

=== Results ===
2006 Mississippi's 2nd congressional district election
Party	Candidate	Votes	%
Democratic	Bennie Thompson (incumbent)	100,160	64.27
Republican	Yvonne Brown	55,672	35.73
Total votes		155,832	100.00
Democratic hold			

==== By county ====
County	Bennie Thompson Democratic		Yvonne Brown Republican		Margin		Total
County	#	%	#	%	#	%	Total
Attala	2,312	47.64%	2,541	52.36%	-229	-4.72%	4,853
Bolivar	5,276	65.66%	2,759	34.34%	2,517	31.33%	8,035
Carroll	1,384	49.82%	1,394	50.18%	-10	-0.36%	2,778
Claiborne	2,601	82.57%	549	17.43%	2,052	65.14%	3,150
Coahoma	3,789	65.83%	1,967	34.17%	1,822	31.65%	5,756
Copiah	4,512	55.84%	3,568	44.16%	944	11.68%	8,080
Hinds (part)	34,263	70.10%	14,617	29.90%	19,646	40.19%	48,880
Holmes	3,854	76.85%	1,161	23.15%	2,693	53.70%	5,015
Humphreys	1,877	73.58%	674	26.42%	1,203	47.16%	2,551
Issaquena	402	65.58%	211	34.42%	191	31.16%	613
Jefferson	2,462	86.87%	372	13.13%	2,090	73.75%	2,834
Leake (part)	1,535	57.82%	1,120	42.18%	415	15.63%	2,655
Leflore	4,139	60.64%	2,687	39.36%	1,452	21.27%	6,826
Madison (part)	4,617	63.27%	2,680	36.73%	1,937	26.55%	7,297
Montgomery	1,781	52.71%	1,598	47.29%	183	5.42%	3,379
Quitman	1,392	66.99%	686	33.01%	706	33.97%	2,078
Sharkey	1,170	71.04%	477	28.96%	693	42.08%	1,647
Sunflower	3,839	67.85%	1,819	32.15%	2,020	35.70%	5,658
Tallahatchie	2,948	67.37%	1,428	32.63%	1,520	34.73%	4,376
Tunica	1,257	72.87%	468	27.13%	789	45.74%	1,725
Warren	5,610	46.30%	6,506	53.70%	-896	-7.40%	12,116
Washington	6,168	64.57%	3,384	35.43%	2,784	29.15%	9,552
Yazoo	2,972	49.72%	3,006	50.28%	-34	-0.57%	5,978
Totals	100,160	64.27%	55,672	35.73%	44,488	28.55%	155,832

== District 3 ==
2006 Mississippi's 3rd congressional district election

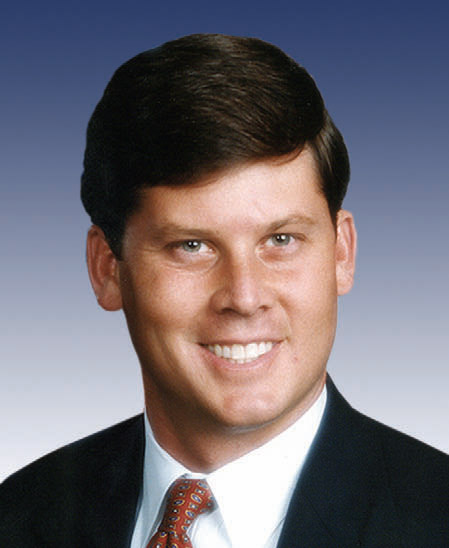

Nominee	Chip Pickering	Jim Giles	Lamonica L. Magee
Party	Republican	Independent	Reform
Popular vote	125,421	25,999	10,060
Percentage	77.67%	16.10%	6.23%
- Pickering: 50–60% 60–70% 70–80% 80–90% Giles: 40–50%
U.S. Representative before election
Chip Pickering
Republican
Elected U.S. Representative
Chip Pickering
Republican

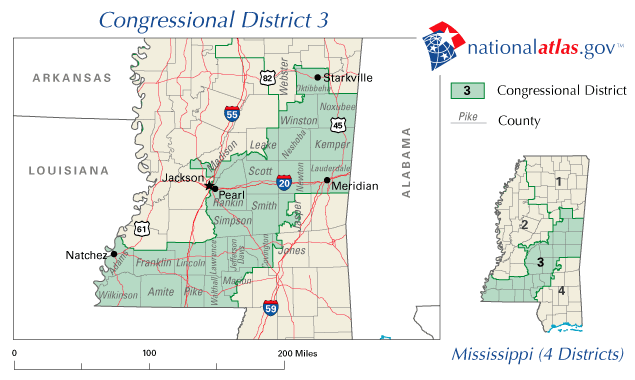

In a repeat of the 2004 race, Republican incumbent Charles "Chip" Pickering, Jr. had no Democratic challenger, but faced independent Jim Giles and Reform Party candidate Lamonica Magee. This Republican-leaning district starts in the lower western part of the state and goes through the Jackson suburbs and up to east central Mississippi. Pickering was first elected in 1996 after the retirement of long-time incumbent Sonny Montgomery (D). The only strong challenge he has faced so far was in 2002 when reapportionment caused Mississippi to lose a House seat. Pickering was pitted against Democrat Ronnie Shows, the two-term incumbent in the old 4th District; Pickering won with over 60% of the vote. The only candidates running against him this year are independent candidate Jim Giles, an organic farmer and ex-systems engineer known for his white supremacist views, and Reform Party candidate Lamonica Magee.

=== Predictions ===
Source	Ranking	As of
The Cook Political Report	Safe R	November 6, 2006
Rothenberg	Safe R	November 6, 2006
Sabato's Crystal Ball	Safe R	November 6, 2006
Real Clear Politics	Safe R	November 7, 2006
CQ Politics	Safe R	November 7, 2006

=== Results ===
2006 Mississippi's 3rd congressional district election
Party	Candidate	Votes	%
Republican	Chip Pickering (incumbent)	125,421	77.67
Independent	Jim Giles	25,999	16.10
Reform	Lamonica L. Magee	10,060	6.23
Total votes		161,480	100.00
Republican hold			

==== By county ====
County	Chip Pickering Republican		Jim Giles Independent		Lamonica L. Magee Reform		Margin		Total
County	#	%	#	%	#	%	#	%	Total
Adams	3,955	63.72%	1,770	28.52%	482	7.77%	2,185	35.20%	6,207
Amite	2,861	68.49%	942	22.55%	374	8.95%	1,919	45.94%	4,177
Covington	3,512	73.86%	824	17.33%	419	8.81%	2,688	56.53%	4,755
Franklin	2,055	77.34%	387	14.57%	215	8.09%	1,668	62.78%	2,657
Hinds (part)	8,262	83.32%	1,139	11.49%	515	5.19%	7,123	71.83%	9,916
Jasper (part)	931	68.61%	323	23.80%	103	7.59%	608	44.80%	1,357
Jefferson Davis	2,182	57.77%	1,152	30.50%	443	11.73%	1,030	27.27%	3,777
Jones (part)	459	77.27%	106	17.85%	29	4.88%	353	59.43%	594
Kemper	1,970	70.56%	594	21.28%	228	8.17%	1,376	49.28%	2,792
Lauderdale	13,610	84.09%	1,979	12.23%	597	3.69%	11,631	71.86%	16,186
Lawrence	2,749	75.56%	625	17.18%	264	7.26%	2,124	58.38%	3,638
Leake (part)	1,481	82.10%	259	14.36%	64	3.55%	1,222	67.74%	1,804
Lincoln	5,525	78.08%	1,213	17.14%	338	4.78%	4,312	60.94%	7,076
Madison (part)	11,077	85.48%	1,377	10.63%	505	3.90%	9,700	74.85%	12,959
Marion (part)	1,874	78.67%	426	17.88%	82	3.44%	1,448	60.79%	2,382
Neshoba	4,073	84.54%	553	11.48%	192	3.99%	3,520	73.06%	4,818
Newton	3,390	86.33%	427	10.87%	110	2.80%	2,963	75.45%	3,927
Noxubee	1,765	57.10%	1,017	32.90%	309	10.00%	748	24.20%	3,091
Oktibbeha	5,881	71.16%	1,689	20.44%	694	8.40%	4,192	50.73%	8,264
Pike	5,756	64.78%	1,833	20.63%	1,297	14.60%	3,923	44.15%	8,886
Rankin	23,809	87.34%	2,586	9.49%	866	3.18%	21,223	77.85%	27,261
Scott	3,362	77.52%	733	16.90%	242	5.58%	2,629	60.62%	4,337
Simpson	4,284	77.23%	814	14.67%	449	8.09%	3,470	62.56%	5,547
Smith	3,343	85.35%	423	10.80%	151	3.85%	2,920	74.55%	3,917
Walthall	2,561	70.09%	577	15.79%	516	14.12%	1,984	54.30%	3,654
Webster (part)	161	79.31%	30	14.78%	12	5.91%	131	64.53%	203
Wilkinson	1,089	41.74%	1,210	46.38%	310	11.88%	-121	-4.64%	2,609
Winston (part)	3,444	73.45%	991	21.13%	254	5.42%	2,453	52.31%	4,689
Totals	125,421	77.67%	25,999	16.10%	10,060	6.23%	99,422	61.57%	161,480

== District 4 ==
2006 Mississippi's 4th congressional district election

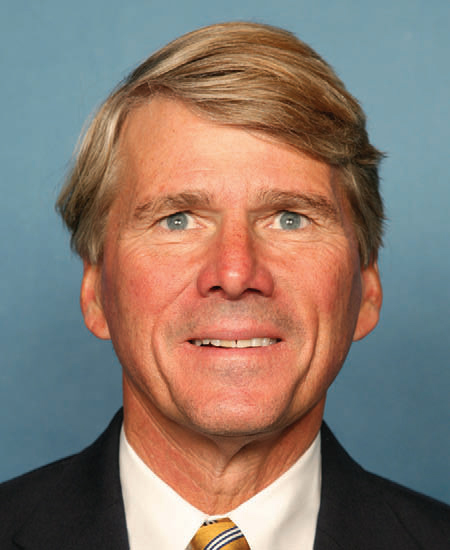

Nominee	Gene Taylor	Randy McDonnell
Party	Democratic	Republican
Popular vote	110,996	28,117
Percentage	79.79%	20.21%
- County results Taylor: 60–70% 70–80% 80–90%
U.S. Representative before election
Gene Taylor
Democratic
Elected U.S. Representative
Gene Taylor
Democratic

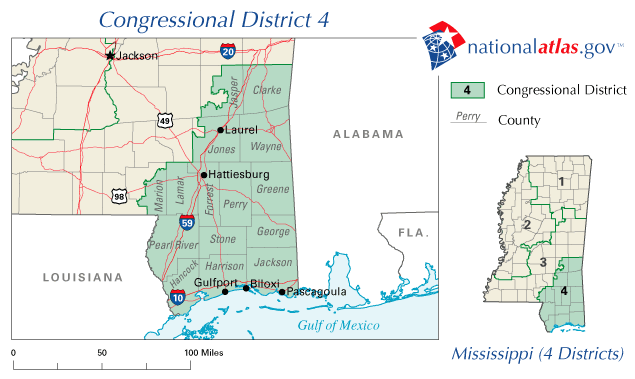

Democrat Gene Taylor, the incumbent, faced Republican Randall McDonnell. This district, heavily devastated by Hurricane Katrina, covers the Mississippi Gulf Coast and inland areas directly north of it. While the district leans Republican, conservative Democrat Taylor had comfortably held the seat since winning in a 1989 special election caused by the death of freshman Republican congressman Larkin Smith. McDonnell is an accountant and ran against Taylor in 1998 and 2000.

=== Predictions ===
Source	Ranking	As of
The Cook Political Report	Safe D	November 6, 2006
Rothenberg	Safe D	November 6, 2006
Sabato's Crystal Ball	Safe D	November 6, 2006
Real Clear Politics	Safe D	November 7, 2006
CQ Politics	Safe D	November 7, 2006

=== Results ===
2006 Mississippi's 4th congressional district election
Party	Candidate	Votes	%
Democratic	Gene Taylor (incumbent)	110,996	79.79
Republican	Randy McDonnell	28,117	20.21
Total votes		139,113	100.00
Democratic hold			

==== By county ====
County	Gene Taylor Democratic		Randy McDonnell Republican		Margin		Total
County	#	%	#	%	#	%	Total
Clarke	2,812	66.26%	1,432	33.74%	1,380	32.52%	4,244
Forrest	11,013	79.36%	2,864	20.64%	8,149	58.72%	13,877
George	2,943	81.01%	690	18.99%	2,253	62.01%	3,633
Greene	2,930	83.43%	582	16.57%	2,348	66.86%	3,512
Hancock	6,466	84.45%	1,191	15.55%	5,275	68.89%	7,657
Harrison	23,523	86.51%	3,667	13.49%	19,856	73.03%	27,190
Jackson	18,508	82.22%	4,003	17.78%	14,505	64.44%	22,511
Jasper (part)	1,923	82.71%	402	17.29%	1,521	65.42%	2,325
Jones (part)	10,484	76.15%	3,283	23.85%	7,201	52.31%	13,767
Lamar	8,680	71.57%	3,448	28.43%	5,232	43.14%	12,128
Marion (part)	2,847	74.06%	997	25.94%	1,850	48.13%	3,844
Pearl River	10,097	72.27%	3,874	27.73%	6,223	44.54%	13,971
Perry	2,205	83.40%	439	16.60%	1,766	66.79%	2,644
Stone	2,731	85.32%	470	14.68%	2,261	70.63%	3,201
Wayne	3,834	83.19%	775	16.81%	3,059	66.37%	4,609
Totals	110,996	79.79%	28,117	20.21%	82,879	59.58%	139,113
