= Jackie Wallace =

American football player (born 1951)

- Wallace in 1977

No. 25, 20
- Positions: Cornerback, Return specialist

Personal information
- Born: March 13, 1951 (age 75); New Orleans, Louisiana, U.S.
- Listed height: 6 ft 3 in (1.91 m)
- Listed weight: 197 lb (89 kg)

Career information
- High school: St. Augustine (New Orleans)
- College: Arizona
- NFL draft: 1973: 2nd round, 34th overall pick

Career history
- Minnesota Vikings (1973)*; Minnesota Vikings (1974); Baltimore Colts (1975–1976); Los Angeles Rams (1977–1979)
- * Offseason or practice squad member only

Awards and highlights
- Second-team All-American (1972)

Career NFL statistics
- Games played: 70
- Starts: 34
- Punt returns: 83
- Punt return yards: 852
- Interceptions: 11
- Stats at Pro Football Reference

Jackie Wallace (born March 13, 1951) is an American former professional football player who was a cornerback in the National Football League (NFL). He played college football for the Arizona Wildcats from 1970 through 1972 and in the NFL for the Minnesota Vikings, Baltimore Colts, and Los Angeles Rams from 1974 through 1979, taking part in two Super Bowls with the Vikings and Rams.

Since the end of his NFL career, Wallace has periodically struggled with substance abuse and experienced bouts of homelessness. In 2014, he joined a class-action concussion lawsuit against the NFL. His whereabouts were unknown until November 2019 when NOLA did another article about him.

== Biography ==
=== Early life ===
Wallace was born in New Orleans, Louisiana, where he lived in the St. Bernard Projects.

=== Career ===
Wallace attended St. Augustine High School in New Orleans. He enrolled at the University of Arizona and played college football for the Arizona Wildcats from 1970 through 1972. United Press International and Sporting News named him a first-team All-America in 1972, while the Associated Press named him a third-team All-American. He was named to the All-Western Athletic Conference (WAC) team in his junior and senior years. Wallace had 20 interceptions with the Wildcats, the second-most in school history, with 19 of those coming in his junior and senior years. His 11 interceptions in 1971 is a WAC record.

The Minnesota Vikings selected Wallace in the second round, with the 34th overall pick, in the 1973 NFL draft. Wallace played six professional seasons as a cornerback from 1974 through 1979. He spent his rookie season on the Vikings' practice squad, including Super Bowl VIII. He became a starter for the Vikings the next year, and started in Super Bowl IX.

Wallace played for the Baltimore Colts in 1975 and the Los Angeles Rams from 1976 through 1979. His 52 punt returns and 618 punt return yards led the NFL in 1978. His final game in the NFL was Super Bowl XIV as a member of the Rams. After the game, he berated his coach in the Rose Bowl locker room for not using him in the game, saying the coach could "kiss his ass". That offseason, he was disinvited from the Super Bowl ring party and cut from the team. He retired with 11 career interceptions in 70 games played.

=== Post-football life ===
Out of the NFL, Wallace worked on an oil platform. The year after his football career ended, his mother died and he began to abuse alcohol and use crack cocaine. He has battled addictions to numerous drugs, including crack, alcohol, and heroin, throughout his life, and has disappeared for years at a time.

Ted Jackson, a photojournalist for The Times-Picayune, discovered him homeless on the streets of New Orleans in 1990, and published a photo he took of the former player, which inspired Wallace to make an attempt at recovery; at the time, his whereabouts had been unknown for roughly a decade. He became sober, got married, and bought a house in the northeastern suburbs of Baltimore. His sobriety lasted until 2002, when a domestic dispute with his wife led to him fleeing back to the streets of New Orleans. After several years of drug use, he was jailed in 2008 for check fraud, serving half of a seven-year sentence. He was released early for good behavior.

On June 5, 2012, the WDSU television channel in New Orleans ran an article about the New Orleans Mission (a homeless shelter) closing its doors due to financial problems. In the article, Wallace stated that he was homeless and had been frequenting the shelter for two months. Wallace achieved sobriety again in 2014 and joined Narcotics Anonymous; the same year, Wallace took part in a lawsuit against the NFL regarding concussions.

In July 2017, Wallace disappeared again, having relapsed and returned to the streets. In 2018, he regained sobriety and resumed contact with friends and family.

In August 2020, photojournalist Ted Jackson released a biography of Wallace's life titled You Ought To Do A Story About Me. The two were interviewed by The Today Show, NPR's Weekend Edition and Access Hollywood detailing on how they met, became friends and eventually ended up collaborating on the book.
