= Eddie James Carthan =

American politician from Mississippi

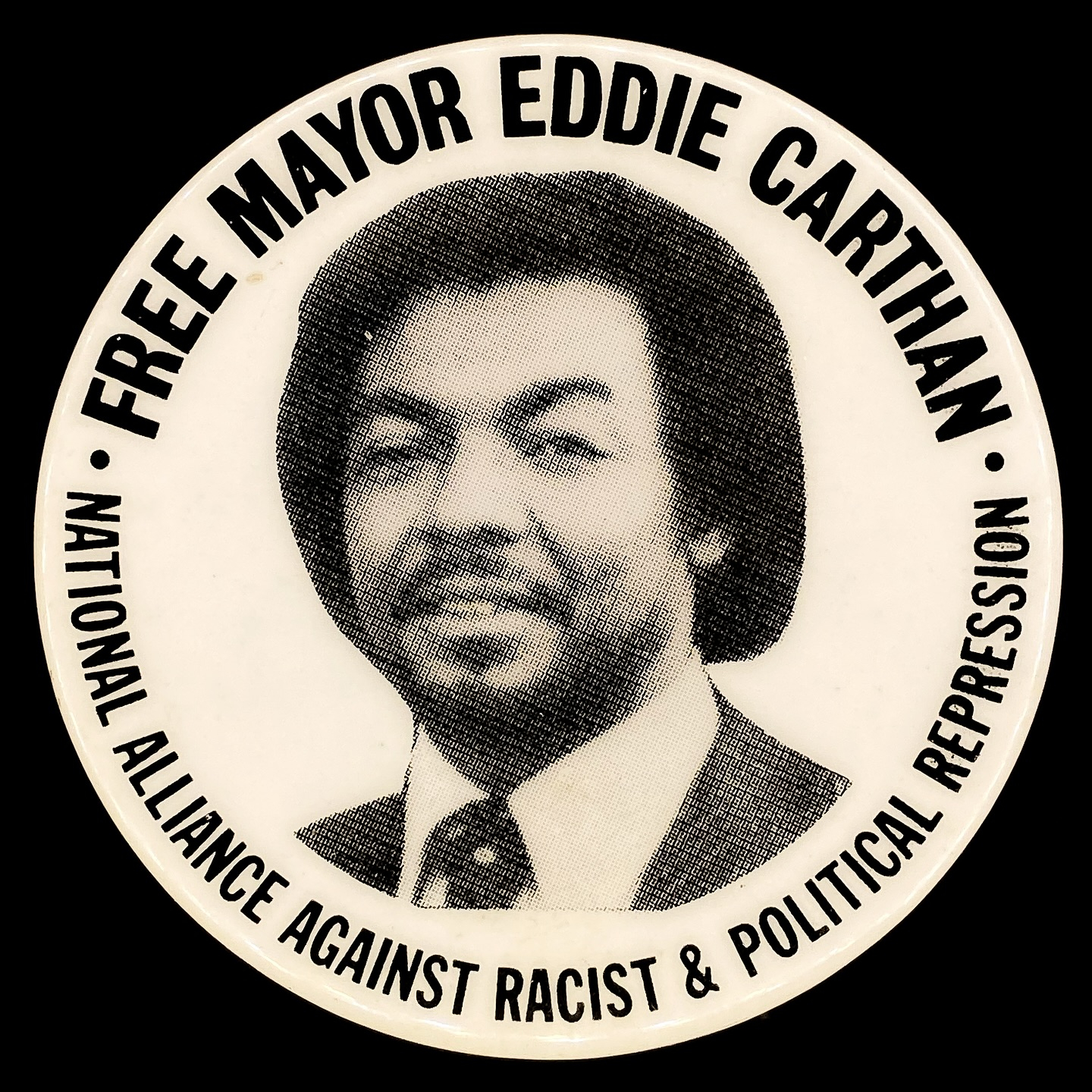
"Free Mayor Eddie Carthan" button, 1982

Eddie James Carthan is a former American politician in Mississippi. When elected in 1977, he was the first black mayor since the Reconstruction era in Tchula, Mississippi. He was elected Holmes County county supervisor in 2015, but was ordered to repay his salary because of his prior felony conviction.

In 1982, Carthan was found not guilty on charges of capital murder for the murder for hire of a political rival and maintained that he had been framed.
