= Steve Broussard (punter) =

American football player (1949–2021)

No. 11
- Position: Punter

Personal information
- Born: July 19, 1949; McComb, Mississippi
- Died: June 1, 2021 (aged 71); Biloxi, Mississippi
- Listed height: 6 ft 0 in (1.83 m)
- Listed weight: 200 lb (91 kg)

Career information
- College: Southern Mississippi
- NFL draft: 1972: undrafted

Career history
- New Orleans Saints (1975)*; Green Bay Packers (1975); Tampa Bay Buccaneers (1976 - 1977)*
- * Offseason or practice squad member only
- Stats at Pro Football Reference

John Steven Broussard (July 19, 1949 – June 1, 2021) was an American professional football player who was a punter in the National Football League (NFL).

== Early life and education ==
Broussard was born in McComb, Mississippi. He graduated in 1967 from Notre Dame High School in Biloxi, where he excelled in four sports, was quarterback of the football team, and was a successful Golden Gloves boxer. He was inducted into the Biloxi Sports Hall of Fame in 2012. He played football at Marion Military Institute, the University of Southern Mississippi, and Auburn University. He then became director of the Ocean Springs Racquet Club & Spa.

== Career ==
Broussard tried out as a free agent with the New Orleans Saints in 1975, playing in exhibition games. Three weeks after being waived by the Saints, he was signed by the Green Bay Packers. He played four games. In the September 21, 1975 season opener against Detroit, Bart Starr's first as Packers coach, three of his punts were blocked, setting an NFL record for most punts blocked in a game. He later attended training camps with the Tampa Bay Buccaneers in their inaugural season, 1976, and in 1977.

== Later life and death ==
Broussard became a disc jockey, playing music of the late 1950s through the 1970s. He died in Biloxi, at the age of 71.
