= Ruth Atkinson Holmes =

American painter and philanthropist

- Born: Ruth Miller; 1909; Hazlehurst, Mississippi, U.S.
- Died: December 5, 1981; McComb, Mississippi, U.S.
- Education: Mississippi University for Women; Mississippi College; Tulane University; Southwest Mississippi Junior College
- Occupation(s): Painter, philanthropist
- Spouses: F. C. Atkinson; Louie M. Holmes

Ruth Atkinson Holmes (1909 - December 5, 1981) was an American painter and philanthropist. She was a member of the "Summit Trio" in Summit, Mississippi in the 1960s.

== Life ==
Holmes was born in Hazlehurst, Mississippi in 1909. She was educated at the Mississippi University for Women, Mississippi College, Tulane University, and Southwest Mississippi Junior College.

Holmes became an encaustic painter in her spare time. In the 1960s, she began exhibiting her work with Bess Phipps Dawson and Halcyone Barnes in Summit, Mississippi. The three artists became known as the "Summit Trio." Holmes donated art to the Mississippi Museum of Art, and African artwork to Delta State University.

Holmes was married twice: first to F. C. Atkinson, with whom she had a son, and secondly to Louie M. Holmes. She resided in Summit with her first husband and in McComb with her second husband, where she died on December 5, 1981. Her funeral was held at the J.J. White Memorial Presbyterian Church.
