= Tchula, Mississippi =

- Town
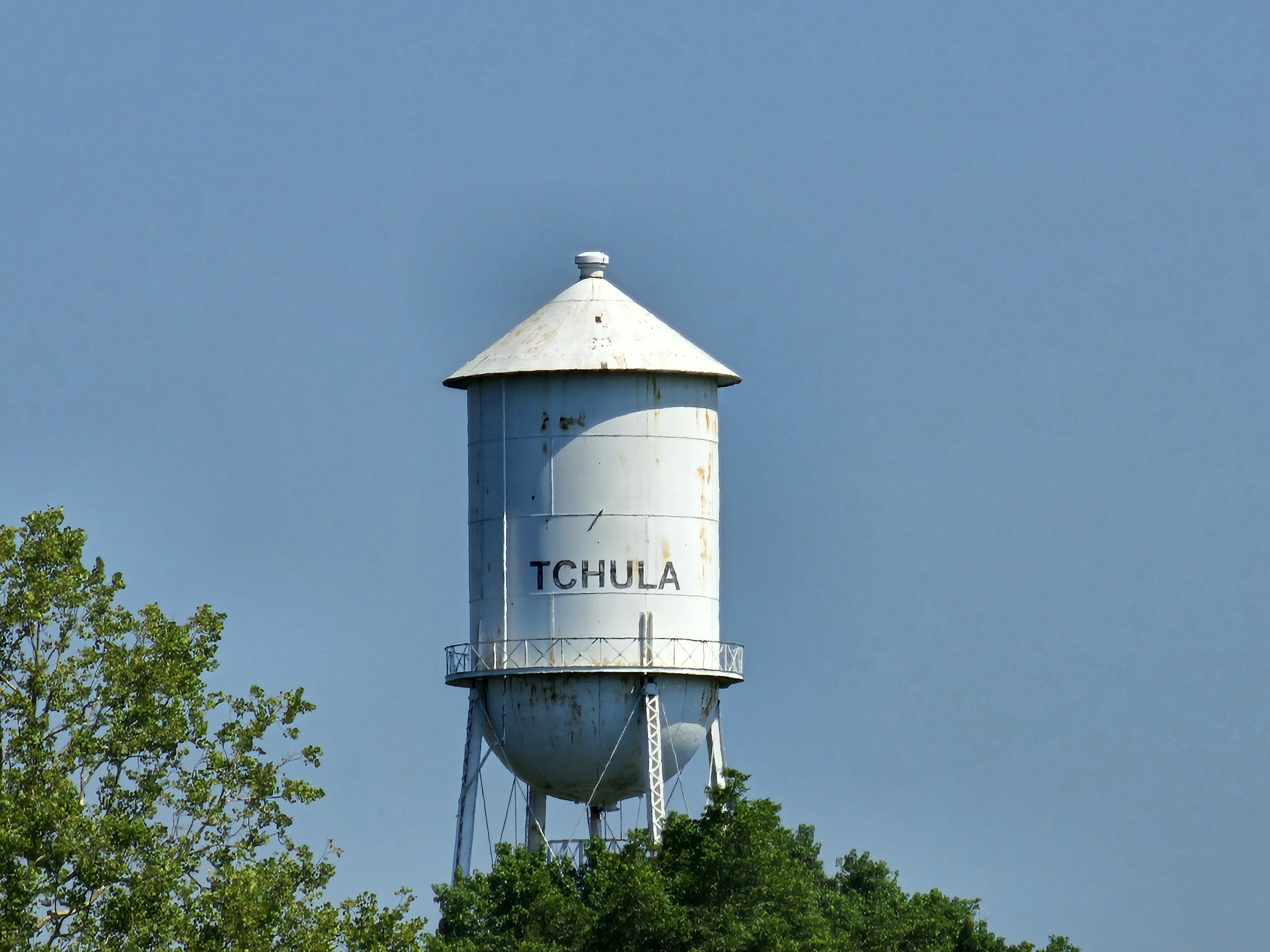
- Water Tower in Tchula

- Location of Tchula, Mississippi

- Location in the United States
- Coordinates: 33°10′51″N 90°13′21″W
- Country: United States
- State: Mississippi
- County: Holmes

Area
  - Total: 1.44 sq mi (3.73 km^{2})
  - Land: 1.41 sq mi (3.65 km^{2})
  - Water: 0.035 sq mi (0.09 km^{2})
- Elevation: 112 ft (34 m)

Population (2020)
  - Total: 1,652
  - Density: 1,173/sq mi (452.9/km^{2})
- Time zone: UTC-6 (Central (CST))
  - Summer (DST): UTC-5 (CDT)
- ZIP code: 39169
- Area code: 662
- FIPS code: 28-72440
- GNIS feature ID: 0678607
- Website: www.cityoftchula.com

Tchula is a town in Holmes County, Mississippi, United States. The population was 1,652 at the 2020 census, down from 2,332 in 2000.

A 2015 article in The Guardian described it as the poorest community in the United States.

== History ==
The first permanent settlement at Tchula was made in the 1830s. The community takes its name from Tchula Lake.

In the 1960s most residents were farmworkers; the properties they worked on belonged to people living in other communities in the area. Mississippi columnist Sid Salter stated that the Tchula area had "Some of the best farmland in America" and "some of the most successful plantations".

In 1982, the city's first Black mayor, Eddie James Carthan, was incarcerated. Chris McGreal of The Guardian stated that the criminal charges were "trumped-up".

In the 2000s the community elected Yvonne Brown as mayor. She was a Republican, and the community hoped this would convince George W. Bush, the President of the United States, to provide additional funding. She was the first black Republican woman to be elected as a mayor in the country.

By 2015 many of the jobs in the area had vanished, partly due to increased use of machines in agriculture. Many businesses formerly in the town had disappeared.

== Geography ==
Tchula is in western Holmes County along Tchula Lake, an old river channel in the Mississippi Delta region of the state. U.S. Route 49E passes through the center of town, leading north 25 miles (40 km) to Greenwood and southwest 27 miles (43 km) to Yazoo. Mississippi Highway 12 leads southeast from Tchula 11 miles (18 km) to Lexington, the Holmes County seat.

According to the United States Census Bureau, the town has a total area of 1.4 square miles (3.7 km^{2}), of which 0.04 square miles (0.1 km^{2}), or 2.31%, is water.

== Demographics ==
Historical population
Census	Pop.	Note	%±
1880	90		—
1900	398		—
1910	478		20.1%
1920	550		15.1%
1930	907		64.9%
1940	861		−5.1%
1950	927		7.7%
1960	882		−4.9%
1970	1,729		96.0%
1980	1,931		11.7%
1990	2,186		13.2%
2000	2,332		6.7%
2010	2,096		−10.1%
2020	1,652		−21.2%
U.S. Decennial Census

=== Racial and ethnic composition ===
Tchula town, Mississippi – Racial and ethnic composition Note: the US Census treats Hispanic/Latino as an ethnic category. This table excludes Latinos from the racial categories and assigns them to a separate category. Hispanics/Latinos may be of any race.
Race / Ethnicity (NH = Non-Hispanic)	Pop 2000	Pop 2010	Pop 2020	% 2000	% 2010	% 2020
White alone (NH)	80	33	20	3.43%	1.57%	1.21%
Black or African American alone (NH)	2,226	2,027	1,607	95.45%	96.71%	97.28%
Native American or Alaska Native alone (NH)	2	0	5	0.09%	0.00%	0.30%
Asian alone (NH)	0	4	0	0.00%	0.19%	0.00%
Native Hawaiian or Pacific Islander alone (NH)	0	0	0	0.00%	0.00%	0.00%
Other race alone (NH)	0	0	0	0.00%	0.00%	0.00%
Mixed race or Multiracial (NH)	13	8	10	0.56%	0.38%	0.61%
Hispanic or Latino (any race)	11	24	10	0.47%	1.15%	0.61%
Total	2,332	2,096	1,652	100.00%	100.00%	100.00%

=== 2020 census ===
As of the 2020 census, Tchula had a population of 1,652. The median age was 36.6 years. 26.8% of residents were under the age of 18 and 13.9% of residents were 65 years of age or older. For every 100 females there were 79.8 males, and for every 100 females age 18 and over there were 73.4 males age 18 and over.

0.0% of residents lived in urban areas, while 100.0% lived in rural areas.

There were 667 households in Tchula, of which 37.5% had children under the age of 18 living in them. Of all households, 15.0% were married-couple households, 22.5% were households with a male householder and no spouse or partner present, and 57.3% were households with a female householder and no spouse or partner present. About 32.6% of all households were made up of individuals and 13.3% had someone living alone who was 65 years of age or older.

There were 703 housing units, of which 5.1% were vacant. The homeowner vacancy rate was 0.9% and the rental vacancy rate was 4.2%.

Racial composition as of the 2020 census
Race	Number	Percent
White	21	1.3%
Black or African American	1,614	97.7%
American Indian and Alaska Native	5	0.3%
Asian	0	0.0%
Native Hawaiian and Other Pacific Islander	0	0.0%
Some other race	2	0.1%
Two or more races	10	0.6%

=== 2000 census ===
As of the census of 2000, there were 2,332 people, 724 households, and 524 families residing in the town. The population density was 1,683.6 inhabitants per square mile (650.0/km^{2}). There were 772 housing units at an average density of 557.4 per square mile (215.2/km^{2}). The racial makeup of the town was 3.43% White, 95.93% African American, 0.09% Native American, and 0.56% from two or more races. Hispanic or Latino of any race were 0.47% of the population.

There were 724 households, out of which 38.1% had children under the age of 18 living with them, 21.4% were married couples living together, 45.4% had a female householder with no husband present, and 27.5% were non-families. 25.1% of all households were made up of individuals, and 8.8% had someone living alone who was 65 years of age or older. The average household size was 3.22 and the average family size was 3.92.

In the town, the population was spread out, with 37.9% under the age of 18, 13.0% from 18 to 24, 25.1% from 25 to 44, 14.7% from 45 to 64, and 9.4% who were 65 years of age or older. The median age was 24 years. For every 100 females, there were 80.6 males. For every 100 females age 18 and over, there were 71.5 males.

The median income for a household in the town was $11,571, and the median income for a family was $14,773. Males had a median income of $22,250 versus $16,310 for females. The per capita income for the town was $6,373. About 49.4% of families and 54.4% of the population were below the poverty line, including 66.6% of those under age 18 and 55.8% of those age 65 or over.

=== Demographic estimates ===
In 2010, Tchula had the fifth-lowest median household income of all places in the United States with a population over 1,000.

== Government and infrastructure ==
In 2015 McGreal stated that the police forces were under-equipped. The police chief himself had a second job.

== Transportation ==
Amtrak’s City of New Orleans, which operates between New Orleans and Chicago, passes through the town on CN tracks, but makes no stop. The nearest station is located in Greenwood, 25 miles (40 km) to the north.

== Education ==
The town of Tchula is served by the Holmes County School District.

Current schools in the area include S.V. Marshall Elementary School and Holmes County Central High School.

The Holmes County Learning Center is in Tchula itself.

Previously Marshall's campus housed S.V. Marshall High School.

== Mississippi Blues Trail marker ==
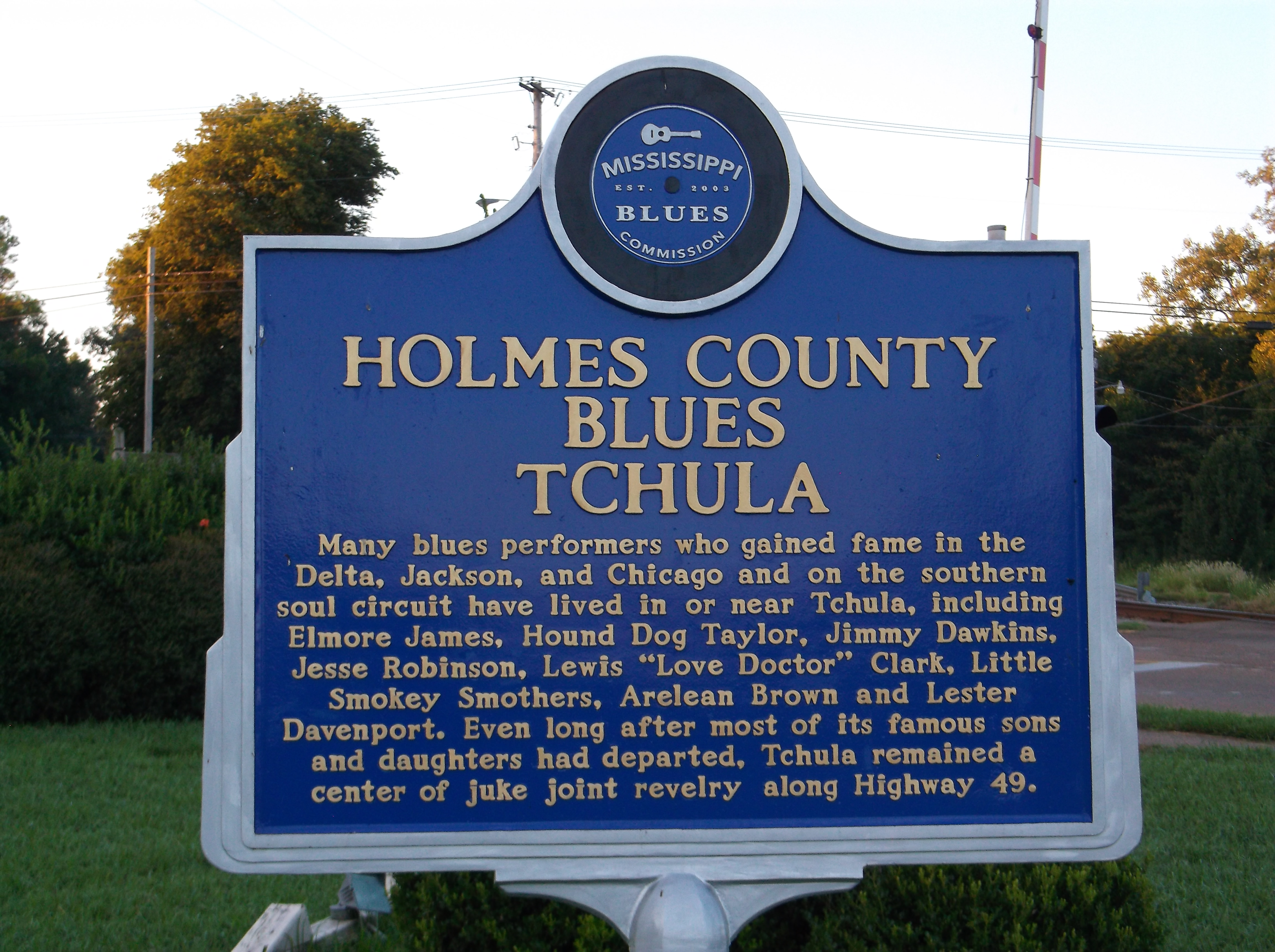
Mississippi Blues Trail marker documents the importance of Tchula in the development of the blues

Several blues musicians lived in the area. A historical marker commemorates their history.

== Notable people ==
- Woodrow Adams, Delta blues guitarist and harmonica player
- Yvonne Brown (1952–2012), mayor of Tchula and the first black Republican female mayor in Mississippi, served from 2001 to 2009. She was the Republican nominee for Mississippi's 2nd congressional district in 2006.
- Jimmy Dawkins (1936–2013), blues guitarist and singer, who moved to Chicago at 18 or 19
- Bess Phipps Dawson, painter and gallerist
- Lester Davenport (1932–2009), blues musician
- Chris Epps, former commissioner of the Mississippi Department of Corrections, pleaded guilty to corruption-related charges
- Addison Grace Hadley - Miss United States 2023
- Johnny Mitchell, former National Football League tight end
- Little Smokey Smothers (1939–2010), blues guitarist and singer
- Hartman Turnbow (1905–1988), one of the first blacks in Mississippi to register to vote in the 1960s since disfranchisement in 1890
