= Brenda Travis =

American civil rights activist (1945–2026)

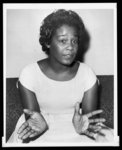
- Brenda Travis
- Born: 16 March 1945; McComb, Mississippi, U.S.
- Died: 17 May 2026 (aged 81)
- Occupation: Civil rights activist
- Parent(s): L.S. Travis and Icie Martin Travis

Brenda Travis (March 16, 1945 – May 17, 2026) was an African-American activist of the civil rights movement from McComb, Mississippi, whose imprisonments for protesting a segregated bus station and participation in a peaceful high school walk out in 1961 helped catalyze public sentiment against segregation.

== Biography ==
=== Early life ===
Travis was born in 1945 in McComb, Mississippi. She was the fourth of her parents' seven children. Her father, L.S. Travis, worked as a sharecropper for Moon Mullen. Despite her mother being late in her pregnancy, Mullen demanded her father go get her mother to help in the fields. Her father refused and Mullen left to get a gun to kill her father. He ran, got her mother, and fled to McComb where she was born shortly after. Travis believed the story of her birth is important as it demonstrates her activism in the Civil Rights Movement was always predetermined, even from the womb."

She was compelled to civil rights activism by the injustice she watched unfold around her at a young age. At ten years old she watch sheriffs break into her house to arrest her 13 year old brother in the middle of the night. This was in 1955, the year Emmett Till was murdered. In an interview in 2007, Travis said following her brother's arrest and seeing the images of Till's body, "I became enraged and knew that one day I had to take a stand."

=== Activism ===
During the summer of 1961, Travis joined the NAACP. On the same day she joined she ran into Bob Moses, who recruited her for help organizing the Student Nonviolent Coordinating Committee's (SNCC's) first voter registration project. That summer she also joined SNCC training for nonviolent protests and became the youth president of the Pike County NAACP.

==== Bus Station Sit-in ====
Following the arrests of Hollis Watkins and Curtis Hayes for a sit-in at Woolworth's in August 1961, the SNCC felt a need to keep the momentum going since the Woolworths sit-in was the first to take place in McComb. The SNCC hosted a mass meeting that same night with over 200 attendees to ask for volunteers. Travis volunteered to participate in a sit in the next day and go to jail along with Robert Talbert and Ike Lewis, who were also students. Together with Watkins and Hayes they were known as the "McComb Five".

On August 30, 1961, Travis, Talbert, and Lewis purchased tickets to New Orleans at the segregated Greyhound Bus station in McComb and sat at the lunch counter. They were immediately arrested, charged with trespassing, and incarcerated at Pike County Jail for 28 days. At the time of her arrest Travis was 16 years old. They were released from jail October 3, 1961.

==== Burglund High School walk out ====
After her release from jail, Travis discovered she was expelled from Burglund High School due to her activism. She attempted to re-enroll and was denied October 4, 1961. News spread through the halls of her expulsion quickly and Travis, along with over 100 students, walked out in protest.

The students marched to city hall singing "We Shall Overcome". Once they arrived, they kneeled on the steps and prayed. Many students were beaten by the police and arrested for their participation. Students continued protesting by refusing to return to school until Travis was allowed to re-enroll. As a result, they too were expelled. The 16 seniors who participated were unable to graduate.

Travis' fate for participating in the walk out was more serious. She was arrested for the second time. Travis was denied a trial and sentenced to an indeterminate sentence. After a few days, officers told Travis they were taking her to see her attorney. Instead, they sent her to Oakley Training School, a juvenile detention center near Raymond. Neither her attorney nor mother was informed where she was sent.

==== Exile from Mississippi ====
On April 21, 1962, six and a half months after she was sent to Oakley, a professor from Talladega College met with Mississippi Governor Ross Barnett. The governor agreed to release Travis into his custody, if she agreed to leave Mississippi within 24 hours. Travis refers to this as "Exile from Mississippi".

==== Life after release ====
Shortly after her release, the professor became abusive and she had to flee again. Jim Forman, SNCC Executive Director, helped her flee. He paid for her bus ticket and she spent the rest of the summer with he and his wife in Atlanta.

With support from other activists such as Ella Baker and James Bond, Travis was able to obtain an education. She moved to North Haven, Connecticut, to finish high school. In 1966, she moved to California and attended the Tony Taylor School of Business.

In 2013, Travis founded the Brenda Travis Historical Education Foundation to teach history and encourage both youth leadership and community development opportunities in McComb.

==== Death ====
Travis died on May 17, 2026, at the age of 81.

== Published works ==
- Mississippi's Exiled Daughter: How my Civil Rights Baptism Under Fire Shaped my Life (2018)

== Honors, decorations, awards and distinctions ==
- Brenda Travis Street in McComb is named after her.
- Travis was featured in an exhibit at the Mississippi Civil Rights Museum.

Meritorious leadership award from Tougaloo College
