= Mississippi Department of Human Services =

The Mississippi Department of Human Services (MDHS) is a state agency of Mississippi, headquartered in Jackson. The department operates the state's family services.

== Division of Youth Services ==
The Division of Youth Services (DYS) operates juvenile correctional facilities. One, Oakley Training School, is open, while Columbia Training School has been closed. The two training schools are 125 miles (201 km) apart from one another.

As of 2003 the majority of children committed to the training schools were non-violent offenders. Originally a judge could order child to attend a training school for minor offenses, up to and, including felony charges. On July 1, 2010, new legislation states that only a child who commits a felony or a child who commits three or more misdemeanors could be sentenced to go to a training school. Male juveniles who engage in serious or repeat behaviors and are certified as adults may be asked to go to the Walnut Grove Youth Correctional Facility, a privately operated facility of the Mississippi Department of Corrections in Walnut Grove, Mississippi. David M. Halfbinger of The New York Times said in 2003 that the MDHS juvenile correctional facilities "look more like rural community colleges -- low-slung, cinder-block buildings scattered across sun-baked meadows, ringed by chain-link fencing -- than the prisons they effectively are."

In early 2020, the state auditor's office arrested John Davis, the former director of the agency and a number of others in what was described as a widespread fraud scheme that diverted aid for the poor into personal profit.

=== Oakley Youth Development Center ===
The Oakley Youth Development Center, formerly the Oakley Training School (OTS), is located in Oakley in unincorporated Hinds County. Oakley has a capacity of 150 students. Oakley Training School, also known as the Mississippi Youth Correctional Complex (MYCC), is located on a 1,068-acre (432 ha) plot of land surrounded by agricultural fields; the State of Mississippi states that the complex is about a 30-minute commute from Jackson.

=== Columbia Training School ===
MDHS owns the Columbia Training School, located in unincorporated Marion County, near Columbia, in southern Mississippi. The state estimates that Columbia is a two and one half hour commute from the school to Gulfport. Columbia is located between Hattiesburg and McComb. The Columbia Training School is located on over 1,000 acres (400 ha) of land. The unfenced complex is surrounded by farmland. Grantier Architecture designed a 10,000 square feet (930 m^{2}) addition and renovation of the school.

On Wednesday June 11, 2008, the final 11 girls at the facility were transferred to another facility in Oakley. The state had paroled the other 26 remaining girls into community-based programs. On June 30, 2008, the Columbia campus was closed. The state closed Columbia because of a desire to save money and concerns about the operation of the facility. When Columbia was open, Oakley took boys ages 15–18, while Columbia took boys 10-14 and girls 10–18. Before desegregation, Columbia housed White children of both sexes; the desegregation plan around the 1970s required Columbia to house girls of all races and boys under 15 years of age of all races. Officials stated that they would like for Columbia to be transformed into a drug treatment center.
