= Summit, Mississippi =

- Town
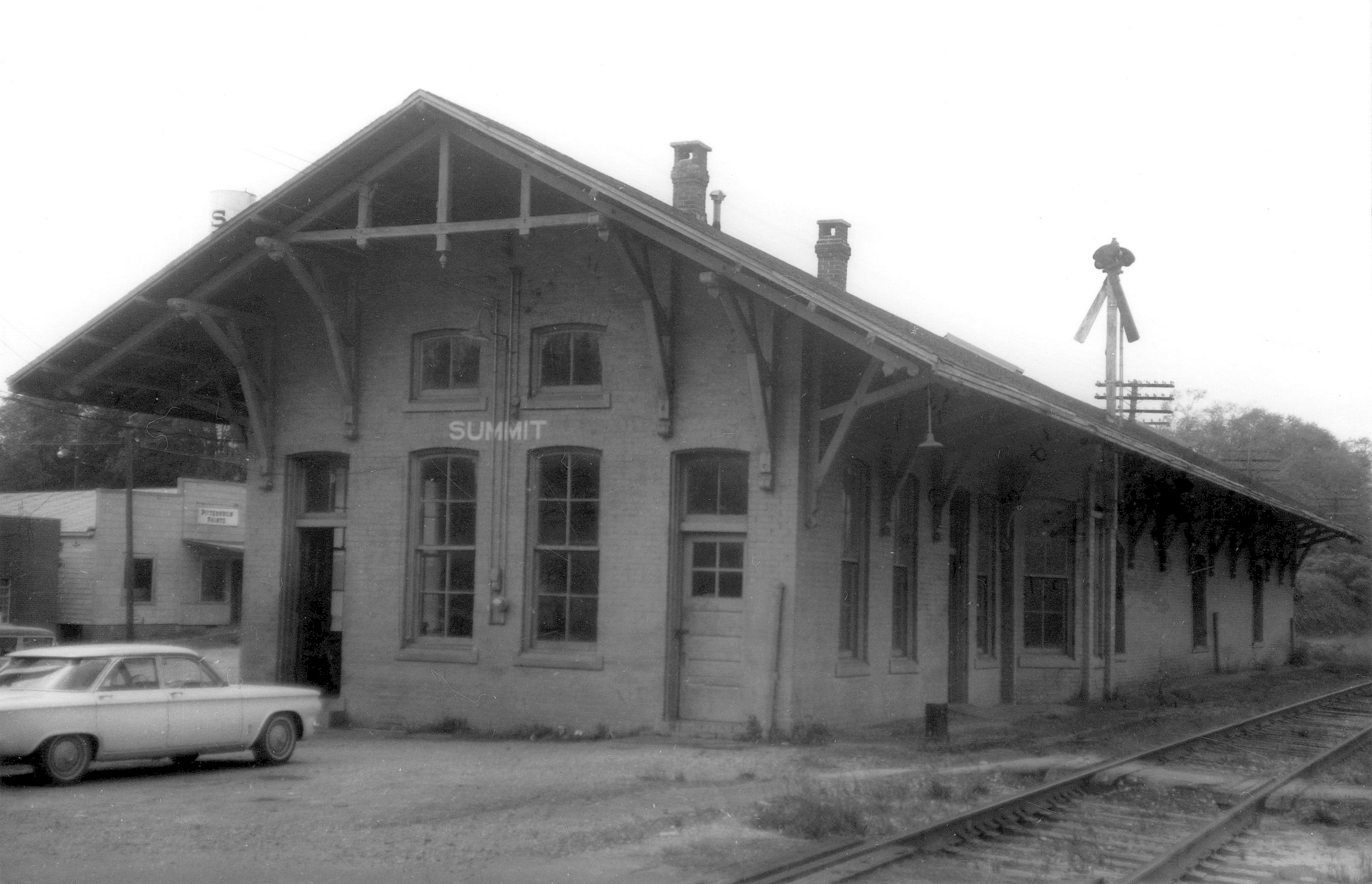
- Illinois Central Railroad depot, 1966

- Flag

- Location of Summit, Mississippi

- Location in the United States
- Coordinates: 31°17′02″N 90°28′06″W
- Country: United States
- State: Mississippi
- County: Pike

Area
  - Total: 2.31 sq mi (5.98 km^{2})
  - Land: 2.31 sq mi (5.98 km^{2})
  - Water: 0 sq mi (0.00 km^{2})
- Elevation: 433 ft (132 m)

Population (2020)
  - Total: 1,505
  - Density: 652.2/sq mi (251.82/km^{2})
- Time zone: UTC-6 (Central (CST))
  - Summer (DST): UTC-5 (CDT)
- ZIP code: 39666
- Area code: 601
- FIPS code: 28-71480
- GNIS feature ID: 678402
- Website: Official website

Summit is a town in Pike County, Mississippi, United States. As of the 2020 census, Summit had a population of 1,505. It is part of the McComb, Mississippi Micropolitan Statistical Area.

The town originated as a railroad town and was named Summit because it was thought to be the highest point on the Illinois Central Railroad between New Orleans and Jackson, Tennessee. However, nearby Brookhaven has that distinction. It was the birthplace of the "Summit Trio", a group of three women artists in the 1960s.

== Geography ==
According to the United States Census Bureau, the town has a total area of 1.7 square miles (4.4 km^{2}), all land.

== Demographics ==
Historical population
Census	Pop.	Note	%±
1880	1,604		—
1890	1,587		−1.1%
1900	1,499		−5.5%
1910	1,471		−1.9%
1920	1,187		−19.3%
1930	1,157		−2.5%
1940	1,254		8.4%
1950	1,558		24.2%
1960	1,663		6.7%
1970	1,640		−1.4%
1980	1,753		6.9%
1990	1,566		−10.7%
2000	1,428		−8.8%
2010	1,705		19.4%
2020	1,505		−11.7%
U.S. Decennial Census

=== Racial and ethnic composition ===
Summit town, Mississippi – Racial and ethnic composition Note: the US Census treats Hispanic/Latino as an ethnic category. This table excludes Latinos from the racial categories and assigns them to a separate category. Hispanics/Latinos may be of any race.
Race / Ethnicity (NH = Non-Hispanic)	Pop 2000	Pop 2010	Pop 2020	% 2000	% 2010	% 2020
White alone (NH)	463	391	275	32.42%	22.93%	18.27%
Black or African American alone (NH)	943	1,279	1,157	66.04%	75.01%	76.88%
Native American or Alaska Native alone (NH)	0	0	2	0.00%	0.00%	0.13%
Asian alone (NH)	1	1	5	0.07%	0.06%	0.33%
Native Hawaiian or Pacific Islander alone (NH)	0	0	0	0.00%	0.00%	0.00%
Other race alone (NH)	1	0	5	0.07%	0.00%	0.33%
Mixed race or Multiracial (NH)	14	3	43	0.98%	0.18%	2.86%
Hispanic or Latino (any race)	6	31	18	0.42%	1.82%	1.20%
Total	1,428	1,705	1,505	100.00%	100.00%	100.00%

=== 2020 census ===
As of the 2020 census, Summit had a population of 1,505. The median age was 40.3 years. 23.5% of residents were under the age of 18 and 21.3% of residents were 65 years of age or older. For every 100 females there were 87.0 males, and for every 100 females age 18 and over there were 82.3 males age 18 and over.

99.5% of residents lived in urban areas, while 0.5% lived in rural areas.

There were 649 households in Summit, including 379 family households (families). Of all households, 32.0% had children under the age of 18 living in them, 26.0% were married-couple households, 24.0% were households with a male householder and no spouse or partner present, and 45.1% were households with a female householder and no spouse or partner present. About 36.8% of all households were made up of individuals, and 16.0% had someone living alone who was 65 years of age or older.

There were 783 housing units, of which 17.1% were vacant. The homeowner vacancy rate was 5.0% and the rental vacancy rate was 11.7%.

=== 2000 census ===
As of the census of 2000, there were 1,428 people, 589 households, and 394 families residing in the town. The population density was 848.9 inhabitants per square mile (327.8/km^{2}). There were 658 housing units at an average density of 391.2 per square mile (151.0/km^{2}). The racial makeup of the town was 32.63% White, 66.18% African American, 0.07% Asian, 0.14% from other races, and 0.98% from two or more races. Hispanic or Latino of any race were 0.42% of the population.

There were 589 households, out of which 33.4% had children under the age of 18 living with them, 38.5% were married couples living together, 24.3% had a female householder with no husband present, and 33.1% were non-families. 30.9% of all households were made up of individuals, and 13.6% had someone living alone who was 65 years of age or older. The average household size was 2.41 and the average family size was 3.03.

In the town, the population was spread out, with 27.5% under the age of 18, 8.9% from 18 to 24, 27.2% from 25 to 44, 22.3% from 45 to 64, and 14.1% who were 65 years of age or older. The median age was 36 years. For every 100 females, there were 83.8 males. For every 100 females age 18 and over, there were 77.8 males.

The median income for a household in the town was $21,053, and the median income for a family was $24,643. Males had a median income of $27,639 versus $17,000 for females. The per capita income for the town was $12,928. About 26.3% of families and 30.4% of the population were below the poverty line, including 46.3% of those under age 18 and 26.1% of those age 65 or over.

== Education ==
Almost all of the town of Summit is served by the McComb School District, while a small portion in the south lies within the North Pike School District. McComb High School is the comprehensive high school of the former school district.

Southwest Mississippi Community College is in an unincorporated area near Summit. Pike County is in the district of Southwest Mississippi Community College.

== Art ==
In the 1960s, three women artists, Halcyone Barnes, Bess Phipps Dawson, and Ruth Atkinson Holmes exhibited their artwork in Summit, and they became known as the "Summit Trio". The three housewives were trained by Roy Schultz at Summit Junior College. In 2016, three sisters from Summit exhibited original artwork by the Summit Trio and their recreations at the Summit Railroad Depot.

== Notable people ==
- Vernon Butler, National Football League nose tackle
- John Gilmore, jazz musician
- Marie Hull, painter
- Alijah Martin, basketball player
- Ed Manning, National Basketball Association player and coach
- Ellis Marsalis Sr., businessman
- T. R. Stockdale, member of the United States House of Representatives from 1886 to 1895 and justice of the Supreme Court of Mississippi from 1896 to 1897
- Justin Wilson, chef and humorist
