= McComb School District =

School district in Mississippi

Coordinates: 31.245337°N 90.460277°W

The McComb School District is a public school district based in McComb, Mississippi, US.

It includes almost all of McComb and almost all of Summit.

== Schools ==
- McComb High School
  - 1982-1983 National Blue Ribbon School
- Denman Junior High School
- Higgins Middle School
- Kennedy Elementary School
- Otken Elementary School

== Demographics ==
=== 2006-07 school year ===
There were a total of around 2,964 students enrolled in the McComb School District during the 2006–2007 school year. The gender makeup of the district was 49% female and 51% male. The racial makeup of the district was 83.81% African American, 15.15% White, 0.71% Asian, 0.17% Native American, and 0.17% Hispanic. 90.1% of the district's students were eligible to receive free lunch.

=== Previous school years ===
School Year	Enrollment	Gender Makeup		Racial Makeup				
School Year	Enrollment	Female	Male	Asian	African American	Hispanic	Native American	White
2005-06	3,073	49%	51%	0.62%	82.72%	0.10%	0.16%	16.40%
2004-05	2,849	50%	50%	0.42%	81.08%	0.25%	0.11%	18.15%
2003-04	2,869	50%	50%	0.49%	79.26%	0.07%	0.10%	20.08%
2002-03	2,922	51%	49%	0.48%	78.06%	0.17%	0.24%	21.05%

== Accountability statistics ==
	2006-07	2005-06	2004-05	2003-04	2002-03
District Accreditation Status	Accredited	Accredited	Accredited	Accredited	Accredited
School Performance Classifications
Level 5 (Superior Performing) Schools	0	0	0	0	0
Level 4 (Exemplary) Schools	0	0	0	1	1
Level 3 (Successful) Schools	2	4	4	3	1
Level 2 (Under Performing) Schools	2	0	0	0	2
Level 1 (Low Performing) Schools	0	0	0	0	0
Not Assigned	1	1	1	1	1

== See also ==
- List of school districts in Mississippi
