= Pontoon =

Pontoon may refer to:

== Buoyant devices ==
- Float (nautical), an air-filled structure providing buoyancy
- Any of various objects that float on pontoons, including:
  - Pontoon (boat), a flat-bottomed boat supported by two or more pontoons
  - Floatplane, also known as a pontoon plane
  - Floating dock (jetty), a platform supported by pontoons
  - Pontoon bridge, a bridge supported by shallow draft open boats or encased floats

== Entertainment and media ==
- Pontoon (card game), a mainly British card game similar to blackjack (also known as vingt-et-un or 21)
  - Malaysian Pontoon, the variant of pontoon popular in Australian/Malaysian casinos
- "Pontoon" (song), a song by Little Big Town
- Pontoon: A Novel of Lake Wobegon, a 2007 book by Garrison Keillor

== Other uses ==
- Ponton (automobile), or Pontoon style, the automobile fender style
- Pontoon, County Mayo, Ireland
