= Bobby Lounge =

American singer-songwriter

Bobby Lounge (born Dub Brock, 1950) is an American singer-songwriter from McComb, Mississippi, United States. Lounge began playing for house parties while attending Louisiana Tech University in northern Louisiana in the mid 1970s. In the 1980s, Lounge played a handful of shows at Ruby's Roadhouse in Mandeville, Louisiana. He stopped playing professionally for many years while he battled chronic fatigue syndrome. He launched a comeback from a short lived career when he appeared on stage at the 2005 New Orleans Jazz and Heritage Festival, Tipitina's, and the New Orleans House of Blues. That performance was enthusiastically received and subsequently glowing reviews appeared in Rolling Stone, The New York Times, Living Blues, Blues Review, Down Beat, USA Today and other magazines and newspapers.

He has released four albums for the small Abitian record label, I Remember The Night Your Trailer Burned Down, Ten Foot Woman, Bobby's Back in Town Live, and Somethin's Wrong.

== Discography ==
- I Remember the Night Your Trailer Burned Down (2005)
- Ten Foot Woman (2006)
- Bobby's Back in Town Live (2008)
- Somethin's Wrong (2008)
