= Mungo Melanchthon Ponton =

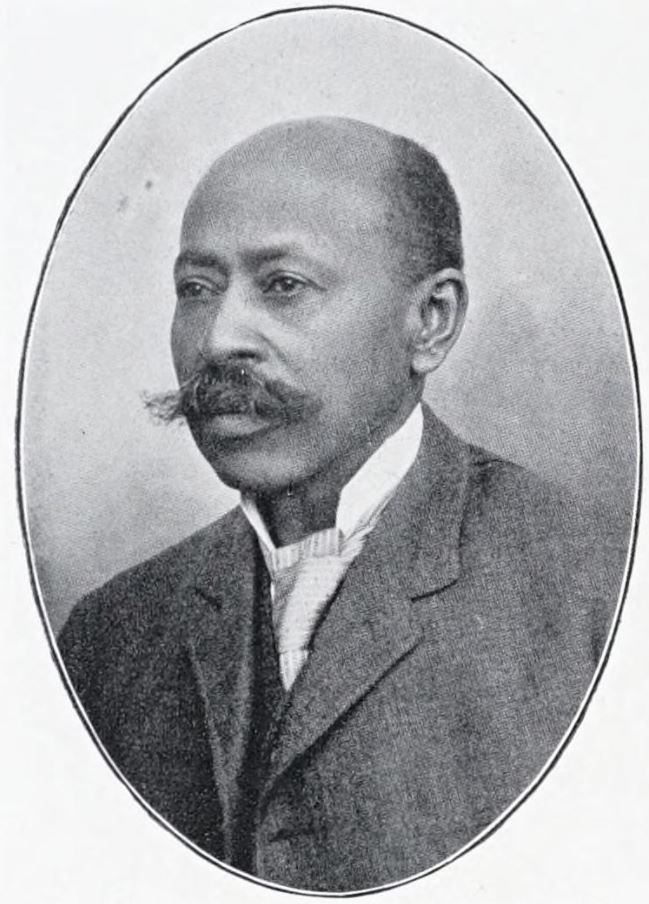
Mungo Melanchthon Ponton, c. 1910

Mungo Melanchthon Ponton (born 1857, 1859, or 1860) was a theologian, author, and educator in the U.S. According to an account by Green Polonius Hamilton, he was born in Halifax County, North Carolina, and both his parents were enslaved. His grandfather was born in Scotland.

His father Henry Ponton was a stonemason. Ponton's parents died in 1863. He worked at various jobs and spent time homeless before enrolling at Lincoln University and graduating with an A.B. in 1888. He earned an S.T.B. degree from Boston University in 1891. He also received a D.D. from Wilberforce University.

He was involved in the A.M.E. Church and became principal of Shorter University and dean of Morris Brown College. He also served as president of Campbell College. In 1912 he established Lampton College in Alexandria, Louisiana. He was a member of Atlanta's Monday Club.

He married A. M. Shoner of Wilmington, North Carolina, in 1895. They lived at 34 Johnson Avenue in Atlanta. She died in 1896. He married Ida E. Upshaw of Washington D.C. in 1900.

== Bibliography ==
- Life and Times of Henry M. Turner (1917)
