= McComb, Mississippi =

- City
- Flag Seal

- Location of McComb

- Location in the United States
- Coordinates: 31°14′40.10″N 90°28′17.73″W
- Country: United States
- State: Mississippi
- County: Pike

Government
  - Mayor: Quordiniah Lockley (D)

Area
  - Total: 11.84 sq mi (30.66 km^{2})
  - Land: 11.78 sq mi (30.51 km^{2})
  - Water: 0.058 sq mi (0.15 km^{2})
- Elevation: 423 ft (129 m)

Population (2020)
  - Total: 12,413
  - Density: 1,053.7/sq mi (406.85/km^{2})
- Time zone: UTC−6 (Central (CST))
  - Summer (DST): UTC−5 (CDT)
- ZIP Codes: 39648-39649
- Area code: 601/769
- FIPS code: 28-43280
- GNIS feature ID: 0673307
- Website: www.mccomb-ms.gov

McComb is a city in Pike County, Mississippi, United States. The city is approximately 80 miles (130 km) south of Jackson. As of the 2020 census, McComb had a population of 12,413. It is the principal city of the McComb, Mississippi Micropolitan Statistical Area.

== History ==
=== 19th century ===
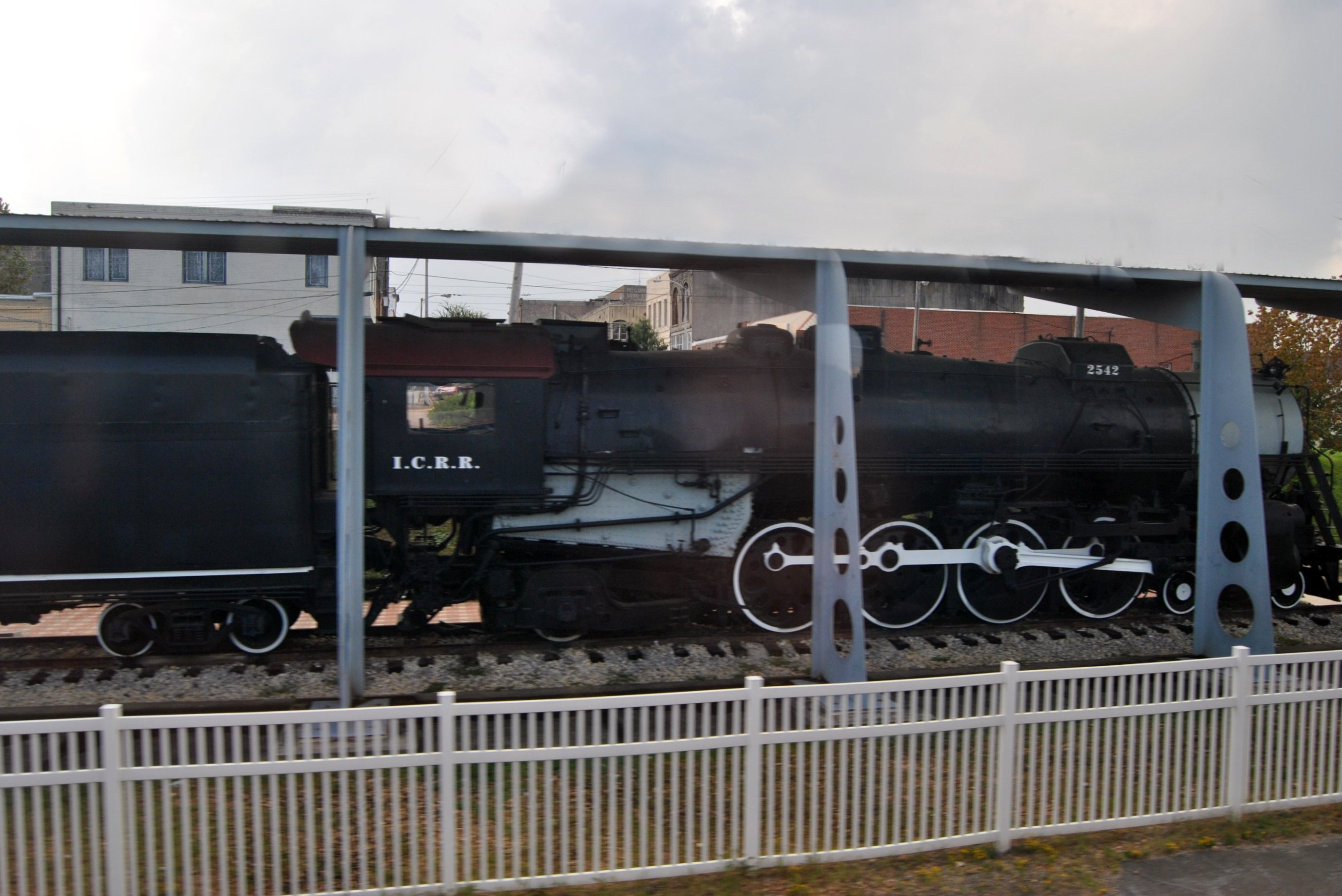
A Steam Locomotive on Display in McComb

McComb was founded in 1872 after Henry Simpson McComb of the New Orleans, Jackson and Great Northern Railroad, a predecessor of the Illinois Central Railroad (now part of the Canadian National Railway), decided to move the railroad's maintenance shops away from New Orleans, Louisiana, to avoid the attractions of that city's bars.

The railroad purchased land in Pike County. Three nearby communities, Elizabethtown, Burglund, and Harveytown, agreed to consolidate to form this town. Main Street developed with the downtown's shops, attractions, and business.

=== 20th century ===
The rail center in McComb was one of flashpoints in the violent Illinois Central shopmen's strike of 1911. Riots took place here that resulted in many injuries, at least three black strikebreakers killed, and authorities bringing in state militia to suppress the emergency soon after the strike started on September 30.

During the 1960s, McComb and nearby areas were the sites of extreme violence by KKK and other white supremacist opponents to the Civil Rights Movement. In 1961, SNCC conducted its first voter registration project in Mississippi in this city. White officials and local KKK members countered it with violence and intimidation to suppress black voters.

In 1961, Brenda Travis, Robert Talbert, and Ike Lewis were arrested for staging a sit-in at a Greyhound station. They were charged with trespassing and kept in jail for 28 days. Following their release, Travis was expelled from school. In response to the expulsion and the murder of Herbert Lee, 115 students staged a walk out on October 4, 1961, known as the Burglund High School Walk Out. At the walk out, many students were beaten by the police and arrested. Students continued protesting by refusing to return to school until Travis was allowed to reenroll. As a result, they too were expelled. The 16 seniors who participated were unable to graduate. Travis' fate for participating in the march was more serious. Travis was arrested, again, and sent to a state juvenile facility without a trial. After 6 1/2 months, Travis was released by the governor and exiled from Mississippi.

After whites severely beat several staff members, staff members being jailed for their involvement with the walkout, and receiving backlash from the community for putting students on the "frontlines", SNCC pulled out of the region in early 1962. They moved north in Mississippi to work in slightly less dangerous conditions.

In 1964, civil rights activists began the Mississippi Project and what would be called Freedom Summer, with teams returning to southwest Mississippi. They sang, "We'll Never Turn Back." SNCC members of the Council of Federated Organizations (COFO) returned to McComb in mid-July 1964 to work on voter registration. From late August 1964 through September, after passage of the Civil Rights Act of 1964, McComb was the site of eleven bombings directed against African Americans. Malcolm Boyd took part of COFO's Freedom House as a member of a clerical delegation to assist African-American voter registration.

The following summer, Congress passed the Voting Rights Act of 1965 authorizing federal oversight and enforcement to enable blacks to register and vote again in the South. In Mississippi, most blacks had been disenfranchised since 1890. Even with enforcement, it took time to overcome local white resistance to black voting.

On January 10, 1975, during the Great Storm of 1975, an F4 tornado caused major damage to 38 blocks in the city, severely damaging or destroying many homes, businesses, vehicles, and trees within the town and surrounding areas along the tornado's track. The tornado killed 9 people and injured 210 others along its 56.5-mile (90.9 km) path.

On October 20, 1977, a chartered plane carrying members and crew of rock band Lynyrd Skynyrd crashed in a swamp near McComb, killing lead singer Ronnie Van Zant, guitarist Steve Gaines, Steve's sister Cassie (a backup singer), road manager Dean Kilpatrick, as well as both pilots.

=== 21st century ===
In 2006, Zach Patterson was elected as McComb's first African American mayor.

In 2018, voters in the city of McComb elected Quordiniah Lockley as mayor, and for the first time elected a city board consisting of an African American majority.

== Geography ==
According to the U.S. Census Bureau, the city has a total area of 11.6 square miles (30 km^{2}), of which 11.6 square miles (30 km^{2}) is land and 0.1 square miles (0.26 km^{2}) (0.54%) is water.

=== Climate ===
The climate in McComb is characterized by hot, humid summers and generally mild to cool winters. According to the Köppen Climate Classification system, McComb has a humid subtropical climate, abbreviated "Cfa" on climate maps.

Climate data for McComb, Mississippi (McComb–Pike County Airport), 1991–2020 normals, extremes 1948–present
Month	Jan	Feb	Mar	Apr	May	Jun	Jul	Aug	Sep	Oct	Nov	Dec	Year
Record high °F (°C)	86 (30)	85 (29)	88 (31)	95 (35)	100 (38)	103 (39)	105 (41)	106 (41)	105 (41)	99 (37)	87 (31)	84 (29)	106 (41)
Mean maximum °F (°C)	75.6 (24.2)	78.9 (26.1)	83.8 (28.8)	86.4 (30.2)	91.9 (33.3)	96.0 (35.6)	97.3 (36.3)	97.5 (36.4)	94.7 (34.8)	89.7 (32.1)	82.1 (27.8)	77.5 (25.3)	98.9 (37.2)
Mean daily maximum °F (°C)	59.8 (15.4)	64.2 (17.9)	71.0 (21.7)	77.0 (25.0)	84.1 (28.9)	89.4 (31.9)	91.0 (32.8)	91.1 (32.8)	87.2 (30.7)	79.1 (26.2)	68.6 (20.3)	61.7 (16.5)	77.0 (25.0)
Daily mean °F (°C)	49.1 (9.5)	53.0 (11.7)	59.5 (15.3)	65.5 (18.6)	73.1 (22.8)	79.2 (26.2)	81.1 (27.3)	81.0 (27.2)	76.9 (24.9)	67.5 (19.7)	56.9 (13.8)	51.1 (10.6)	66.2 (19.0)
Mean daily minimum °F (°C)	38.4 (3.6)	41.9 (5.5)	47.9 (8.8)	54.0 (12.2)	62.1 (16.7)	68.9 (20.5)	71.1 (21.7)	70.9 (21.6)	66.6 (19.2)	55.9 (13.3)	45.3 (7.4)	40.6 (4.8)	55.3 (12.9)
Mean minimum °F (°C)	20.9 (−6.2)	25.5 (−3.6)	29.5 (−1.4)	37.2 (2.9)	47.9 (8.8)	60.6 (15.9)	66.3 (19.1)	64.8 (18.2)	54.3 (12.4)	38.3 (3.5)	28.9 (−1.7)	25.0 (−3.9)	19.2 (−7.1)
Record low °F (°C)	2 (−17)	8 (−13)	14 (−10)	28 (−2)	35 (2)	46 (8)	56 (13)	55 (13)	39 (4)	27 (−3)	16 (−9)	4 (−16)	2 (−17)
Average precipitation inches (mm)	6.40 (163)	5.13 (130)	5.51 (140)	5.02 (128)	4.55 (116)	5.18 (132)	5.95 (151)	5.83 (148)	4.30 (109)	3.79 (96)	3.91 (99)	5.03 (128)	60.60 (1,539)
Average snowfall inches (cm)	0.0 (0.0)	0.0 (0.0)	0.1 (0.25)	0.0 (0.0)	0.0 (0.0)	0.0 (0.0)	0.0 (0.0)	0.0 (0.0)	0.0 (0.0)	0.0 (0.0)	0.0 (0.0)	0.1 (0.25)	0.2 (0.5)
Average precipitation days (≥ 0.01 in)	10.5	10.3	10.3	8.5	9.2	11.8	13.5	11.9	8.6	7.3	8.7	10.8	121.4
Average snowy days (≥ 0.1 in)	0.1	0.0	0.1	0.0	0.0	0.0	0.0	0.0	0.0	0.0	0.0	0.1	0.3
Source 1: NOAA
Source 2: National Weather Service

== Demographics ==
Historical population
Census	Pop.	Note	%±
1880	1,982		—
1890	2,383		20.2%
1900	4,477		87.9%
1910	6,237		39.3%
1920	7,775		24.7%
1930	10,057		29.4%
1940	9,898		−1.6%
1950	10,401		5.1%
1960	12,020		15.6%
1970	11,969		−0.4%
1980	12,331		3.0%
1990	11,591		−6.0%
2000	13,337		15.1%
2010	12,790		−4.1%
2020	12,413		−2.9%
U.S. Decennial Census

=== 2020 census ===
As of the 2020 census, McComb had a population of 12,413. The median age was 37.9 years. 25.7% of residents were under the age of 18 and 18.4% of residents were 65 years of age or older. For every 100 females there were 83.2 males, and for every 100 females age 18 and over there were 77.4 males age 18 and over.

95.6% of residents lived in urban areas, while 4.4% lived in rural areas.

There were 5,101 households in McComb, of which 31.4% had children under the age of 18 living in them. Of all households, 24.4% were married-couple households, 21.2% were households with a male householder and no spouse or partner present, and 46.5% were households with a female householder and no spouse or partner present. About 36.4% of all households were made up of individuals and 15.2% had someone living alone who was 65 years of age or older. There were 2,210 families residing in the city.

There were 5,964 housing units, of which 14.5% were vacant. The homeowner vacancy rate was 3.2% and the rental vacancy rate was 9.8%.

McComb racial composition as of 2020
	Num.	Perc.
White	2,907	23.42%
Black or African American	8,762	70.59%
Native American	18	0.15%
Asian	144	1.16%
Pacific Islander	7	0.06%
Other/Mixed	317	2.55%
Hispanic or Latino	258	2.08%

== Arts and culture ==
An annual Earth Day Fest organized by Pike School of Art – Mississippi is celebrated in April on the Saturday of or following Earth Day. The Summit Street Unity Festival is celebrated annually on the third Saturday in October. The Black History Gallery annually celebrates Juneteenth.

== Education ==
Almost all of the city of McComb is served by the McComb School District, In addition to the McComb School District, the surrounding Pike County area has two other school districts: North Pike School District and South Pike School District. These districts collectively serve various parts of McComb and the greater Pike County area. A portion of the McComb city limits extends into the South Pike district.

McComb also offers private education at Parklane Academy, a K4 through 12th-grade private college preparatory school located in the central part of the city. McComb was also home to St. Alphonsus Catholic Church, which provided classes from kindergarten through seventh grade until the school closed in 2014.

For higher education, Southwest Mississippi Community College is located just 7 miles (11 km) north of McComb, near Summit. Pike County is in the district of Southwest Mississippi Community College.

== Media ==
=== Radio ===
McComb is the principal city of the McComb media market for radio.

=== Television ===
McComb is part of the Jackson media market for television.

== Infrastructure ==
=== Rail transportation ===
Amtrak, the national passenger rail system, provides service to McComb. Amtrak trains 58 & 59, the City of New Orleans stop here.

== Notable people ==
- Woodie Assaf, weather reporter, WLBT television (Jackson) 1953 to 2001
- Jimmy Boyd, singer, musician, and actor
- Loy Allen Bowlin, outsider artist
- John Brady, head coach of Arkansas State University men's basketball team, former head coach of LSU Tigers
- Steve Broussard, NFL player for Green Bay Packers
- Adrian Brown, Major League baseball player with Pittsburgh Pirates, Boston Red Sox, Kansas City Royals and Texas Rangers
- Jackie Butler, former NBA player
- Cooper Carlisle, NFL player
- Castro Coleman, blues musician
- Jacqueline Y. Collins, Illinois state legislator
- Corey Dickerson, MLB player
- Bo Diddley, blues singer, Rock & Roll Hall of Fame inductee
- Judy Dunaway, conceptual sound artist, avant-garde composer, experimental musician, free improvisor, and creator of sound installations (such as latex balloons)
- Jarrod Dyson, MLB player
- Omar Kent Dykes, blues singer and guitarist
- James Govan, soul singer
- King Solomon Hill, early blues musician
- Vasti Jackson, Grammy nominated electric blues guitarist, singer, songwriter and record producer
- Little Freddie King, American Delta blues guitarist
- Maxie Lambright, football coach at Louisiana Tech University, 1967–1978
- Robert "Squirrel" Lester, singer in soul music group The Chi-Lites
- John Lewis, Civil Rights activist
- Bobby Lounge, blues pianist and songwriter
- Sam McCullum, NFL football wide receiver
- Albert Mollegen, Christian apologist
- Bucky Moore, NFL player
- Bob Moses (Robert Moses), Civil Rights activist
- Brandy Norwood, singer and actress
- Willie Norwood, singer, father of Brandy and Ray J
- R. B. Nunnery, football player
- Steven Ozment, historian
- Edward Grady Partin, Teamsters Union figure, spent his last years in McComb
- Tara Wallace, reality star
- Glover Quin, NFL free safety, Detroit Lions and Houston Texans
- Ray J, singer and actor
- La'Porsha Renae, singer, American Idol finalist
- Michael Farris Smith, writer
- Britney Spears, singer and actress
- Bryan Spears, film and television producer
- Jamie Lynn Spears, actress and singer
- Davion Taylor, NFL linebacker for Philadelphia Eagles
- Matt Tolbert, MLB player for Minnesota Twins
- Brenda Travis, civil rights activist
- Dan Tyler, songwriter, born in McComb in 1950
- Charvarius Ward, NFL player
