= Civil rights movement =

1954–1968 U.S. social movement

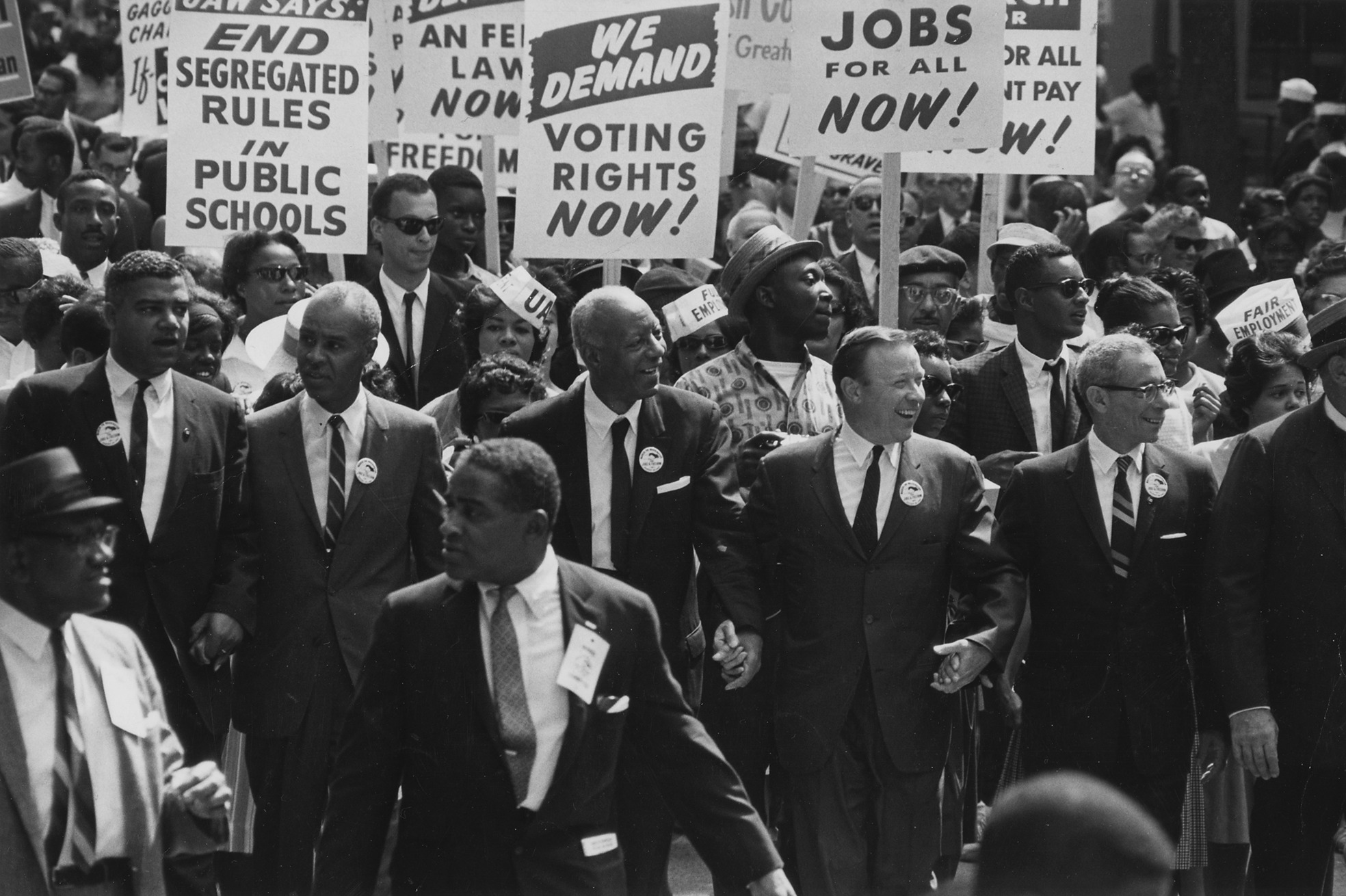
- The 1963 March on Washington participants and leaders marching from the Washington Monument to the Lincoln Memorial
- Date: May 17, 1954 – April 11, 1968 (Note: Various other dates have been proposed as the date on which the civil rights movement began or ended.)
- Location: United States
- Caused by: Racism; racial segregation; disenfranchisement; Jim Crow laws; socioeconomic inequality
- Methods: Nonviolence; nonviolent resistance; civil disobedience
- Result: Rulings by federal judiciary: "Separate but equal" doctrine overturned by Brown v. Board of Education (1954); Bus segregation ruled unconstitutional by Browder v. Gayle (1956); Anti-miscegenation laws ruled unconstitutional by McLaughlin v. Florida (1964); Interracial marriages legalized by Loving v. Virginia (1967); Passage of federal laws: Civil Rights Act of 1957; Civil Rights Act of 1960; Civil Rights Act of 1964; Voting Rights Act of 1965; Civil Rights Act of 1968 (Fair Housing Act); Ratification of the 24th Amendment to the US Constitution (1964); Formation of federal agencies: US Department of Justice Civil Rights Division (1957); US Commission on Civil Rights (1957); Equal Employment Opportunity Commission (1965); Office of Fair Housing and Equal Opportunity (1968)

Parties
Civil rights movement	Federal government of the United States	Pro-segregation countermovement

Lead figures
Martin Luther King Jr. James Bevel; Rosa Parks; John Lewis; Bayard Rustin	Dwight D. Eisenhower; John F. Kennedy; Lyndon B. Johnson	George Wallace; Strom Thurmond; Harry F. Byrd

The civil rights movement (Note: The social movement has also been called the 1960s civil rights movement, the African-American civil rights movement, the Afro-American civil rights movement, the American civil rights movement, the American freedom movement, the Black civil rights movement, the Black revolution, the Black rights movement, the civil rights revolution, the civil rights struggle, the modern civil rights movement, the Negro American revolution, the Negro freedom movement, the Negro movement, the Negro revolt, the Negro revolution, the Second Emancipation, the Second Reconstruction, the Southern freedom movement, and the United States civil rights movement. Civil rights struggles can denote this or other social movements that occurred in the United States during the same period. The social movement's span of time is called the civil rights era.) was a social movement in the United States from 1954 to 1968 which aimed to abolish legalized racial segregation, discrimination, and disenfranchisement in the country, which most commonly affected African Americans. The movement had origins in the Reconstruction era in the late 19th century, and modern roots in the 1940s and in Mahatma Gandhi's nonviolent movement in India. After years of nonviolent protests and civil disobedience campaigns, the civil rights movement achieved many of its legislative goals in the 1960s, during which it secured new protections in federal law for the civil rights of all Americans, including the Civil Rights Act of 1964, the Voting Rights Act of 1965, and the Civil Rights Act of 1968.

Following the American Civil War (1861–1865), the three Reconstruction Amendments to the U.S. Constitution abolished slavery and granted citizenship to all African Americans, the majority of whom had recently been enslaved in the southern states. During Reconstruction, African-American men in the South voted and held political office, but after 1877 they were increasingly deprived of civil rights under racist Jim Crow laws (which for example banned interracial marriage, introduced literacy tests for voters, and segregated schools) and were subjected to violence from white supremacists during the nadir of American race relations. African Americans who moved to the North to improve their prospects during the Great Migration also faced barriers to employment and housing. Legal racial discrimination was upheld by the Supreme Court in its 1896 decision in Plessy v. Ferguson, which established the doctrine of "separate but equal". The movement for civil rights, led by figures such as W. E. B. Du Bois and Booker T. Washington, achieved few gains until after World War II. In 1948, President Harry S. Truman issued an executive order abolishing discrimination in the armed forces.

In 1954, the Supreme Court struck down state laws establishing racial segregation in public schools in Brown v. Board of Education. A mass movement for civil rights, led by Martin Luther King Jr. and others, began a campaign of nonviolent protests and civil disobedience including the Montgomery bus boycott in 1955–1956, "sit-ins" in Greensboro and Nashville in 1960, the Birmingham campaign and its Children's Crusade in 1963, and a march from Selma to Montgomery in 1965. Press coverage of events such as the lynching of Emmett Till in 1955 and the use of fire hoses and dogs against protesters in Birmingham increased public support for the civil rights movement. In 1963, about 250,000 people participated in the March on Washington, after which President John F. Kennedy asked Congress to pass civil rights legislation. Kennedy's successor, Lyndon B. Johnson, overcame the opposition of southern politicians to pass three major laws: the Civil Rights Act of 1964, which prohibited discrimination based on race, color, religion, sex, or national origin in public accommodations, employment, and federally assisted programs; the Voting Rights Act of 1965, which outlawed discriminatory voting laws and authorized federal oversight of election law in areas with a history of voter suppression; and the Fair Housing Act of 1968, which banned housing discrimination. The Supreme Court made further pro–civil rights rulings in cases including Browder v. Gayle (1956) and Loving v. Virginia (1967), banning segregation in public transport and striking down laws against interracial marriage.

The new civil rights laws ended most legal discrimination against African Americans, though informal racism remained. In the mid-1960s, the Black power movement emerged, shaped in significant part by the ideas and example of Malcolm X and the Black Panther Party, criticizing leaders of the civil rights movement for their moderate, incremental tendencies. A wave of civil unrest in Black communities between 1964 and 1969, which peaked in 1967 and after the assassination of King in 1968, weakened support for the movement from White moderates. Despite affirmative action and other programs that expanded opportunities for Black and other minorities in the U.S. by the early 21st century, racial gaps in income, housing, education, and criminal justice persist.

== Background ==
=== American Civil War and Reconstruction era ===
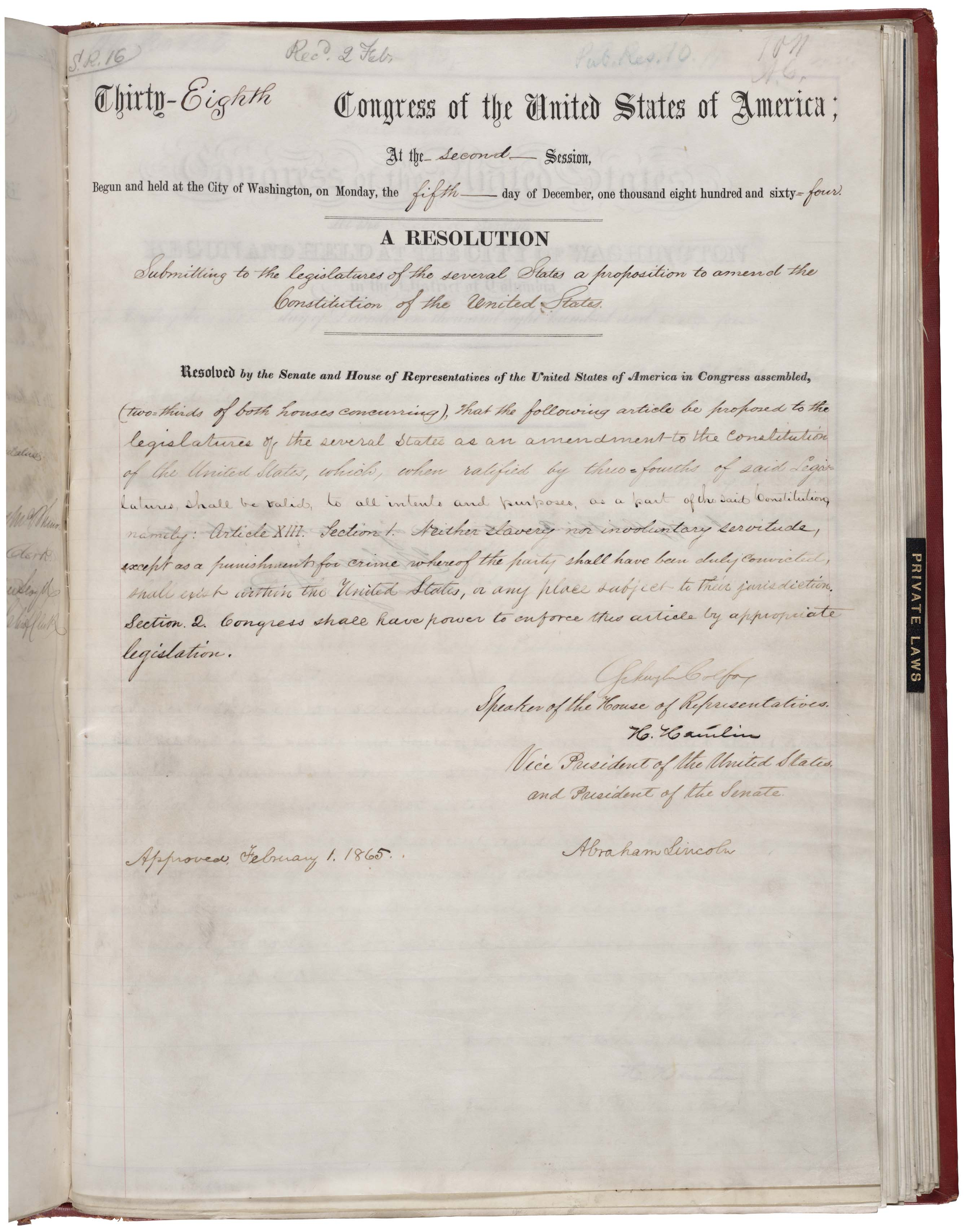
13th Amendment in the National Archives, bearing the signature of Abraham Lincoln

Before the American Civil War, eight serving presidents enslaved people, almost four million black people remained enslaved in the South, generally only white men with property could vote, and the Naturalization Act of 1790 limited U.S. citizenship to whites. Following the Civil War, three constitutional amendments were passed, including the 13th Amendment (1865) that ended slavery; the 14th Amendment (1869) that gave black people citizenship, adding their total for Congressional apportionment; and the 15th Amendment (1870) that gave black males the right to vote (only males could vote in the U.S. at the time). From 1865 to 1877, the United States underwent a turbulent Reconstruction era during which the federal government tried to establish free labor and the civil rights of freedmen in the South after the end of slavery. Many whites resisted the social changes, leading to the formation of insurgent movements such as the Ku Klux Klan (KKK), whose members attacked black and white Republicans to maintain white supremacy. In 1871, President Ulysses S. Grant, the U.S. Army, and U.S. Attorney General Amos T. Akerman, initiated a campaign to repress the KKK under the Enforcement Acts. Some states were reluctant to enforce the federal measures of the act. In addition, by the early 1870s, other white supremacist and insurgent paramilitary groups arose that violently opposed African-American legal equality and suffrage, intimidating and suppressing black voters, and assassinating Republican officeholders. However, if the states failed to implement the acts, the laws allowed the Federal Government to get involved. Many Republican governors were afraid of sending black militia troops to fight the Klan for fear of war.

=== Disenfranchisement after Reconstruction ===
After the disputed election of 1876, which resulted in the end of Reconstruction and the withdrawal of federal troops, whites in the South regained political control of the region's state legislatures. They continued to intimidate and violently attack Black people before and during elections to suppress their voting, but the last African Americans were elected to Congress from the South before the disenfranchisement of Black people by states throughout the region, as described below.

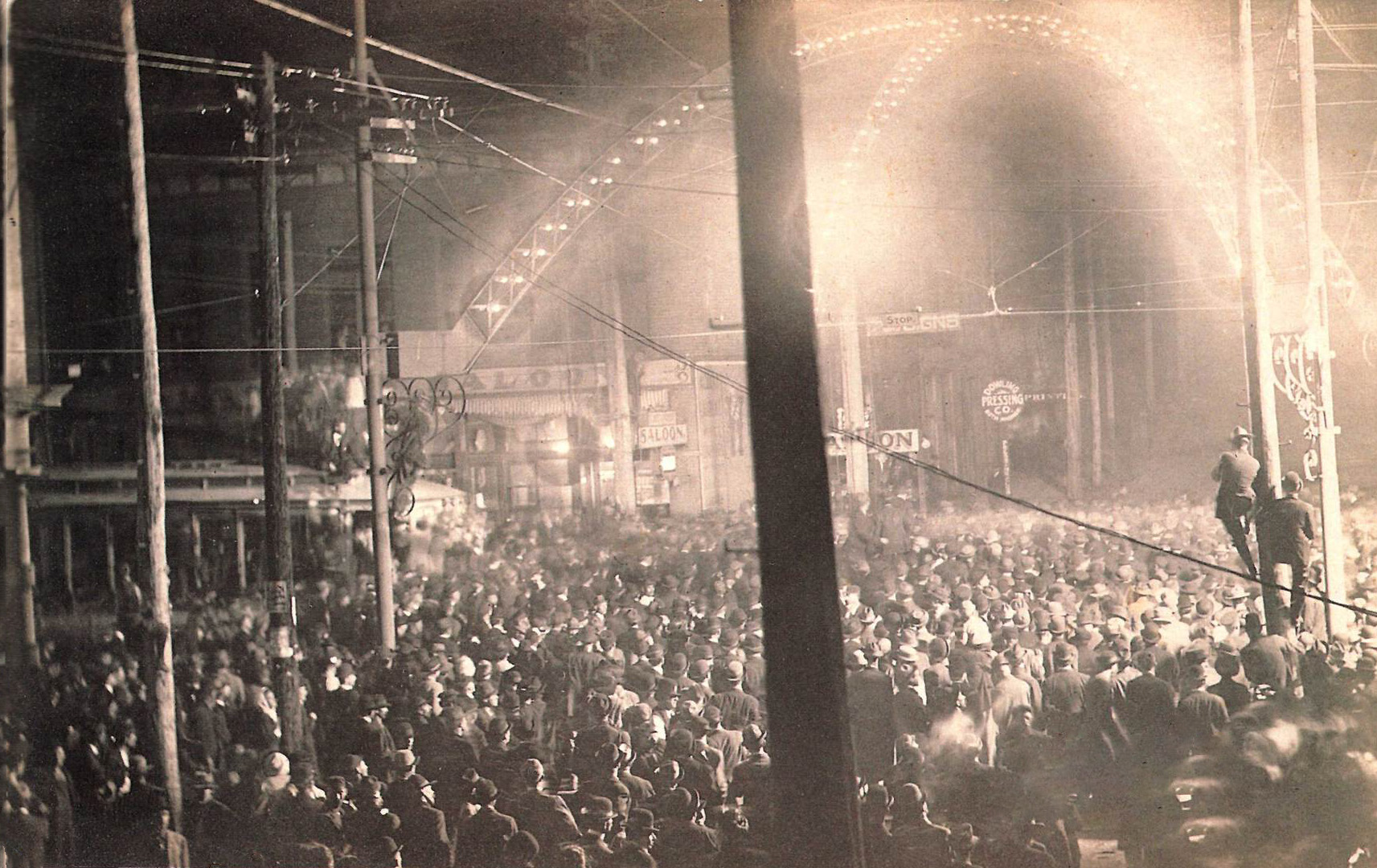
The mob-style lynching of Will James, Cairo, Illinois, 1909

From 1890 to 1908, southern states passed new constitutions and laws to disenfranchise African Americans and many Poor Whites by creating barriers to voter registration; voting rolls were dramatically reduced as Black people and poor whites were forced out of electoral politics. After the landmark Supreme Court case of Smith v. Allwright (1944), which prohibited white primaries, progress was made in increasing black political participation in the Rim South and Acadiana – although almost entirely in urban areas and a few rural localities where most Black people worked outside plantations. The status quo ante of excluding African Americans from the political system lasted in the remainder of the South, especially North Louisiana, Mississippi and Alabama, until national civil rights legislation was passed in the mid-1960s to provide federal enforcement of constitutional voting rights. For more than sixty years, Black people in the South were essentially excluded from politics, unable to elect anyone to represent their interests in Congress or local government. Since they could not vote, they could not serve on local juries.

During this period, the white-dominated Democratic Party maintained political control of the South. With whites controlling all the seats representing the total population of the South, they had a powerful voting bloc in Congress. The Republican Party—the "party of Lincoln" and the party to which most Black people had belonged—shrank to insignificance except in remote Unionist areas of Appalachia and the Ozarks as black voter registration was suppressed. The Republican lily-white movement also gained strength by excluding Black people. Until 1965, the "Solid South" was a one-party system under the white Democrats. Excepting the previously noted historic Unionist strongholds the Democratic Party nomination was tantamount to election for state and local office. In 1901, President Theodore Roosevelt invited Booker T. Washington, president of the Tuskegee Institute, to dine at the White House, making him the first African American to attend an official dinner there. "The invitation was roundly criticized by southern politicians and newspapers." Washington persuaded the president to appoint more Black people to federal posts in the South and to try to boost African-American leadership in state Republican organizations. However, these actions were resisted by both white Democrats and white Republicans as an unwanted federal intrusion into state politics.

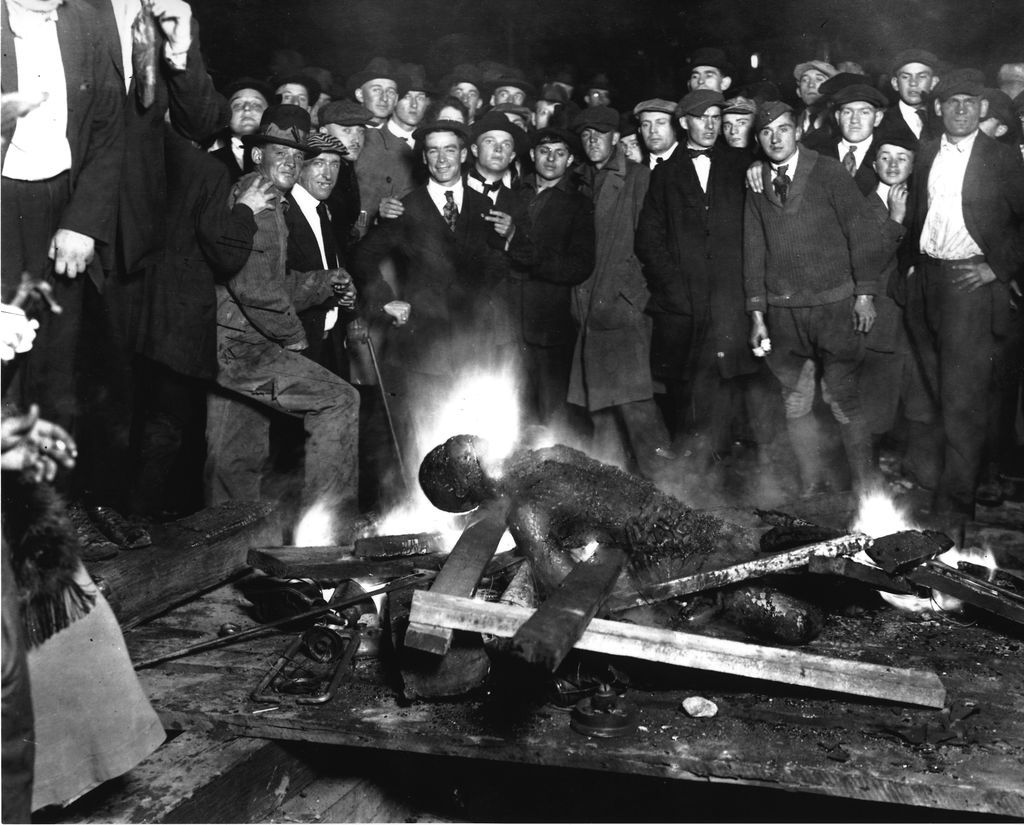
Lynching victim Will Brown, who was mutilated and burned during the Omaha, Nebraska race riot of 1919. Postcards and photographs of lynchings were popular souvenirs in the U.S.

During the same time as African Americans were being disenfranchised, white southerners imposed racial segregation by law. Violence against Black people increased, with numerous lynchings through the turn of the century. The system of de jure state-sanctioned racial discrimination and oppression that emerged from the post-Reconstruction South became known as the "Jim Crow" system. The United States Supreme Court, composed almost entirely of Northerners, upheld the constitutionality of state laws requiring racial segregation in public facilities in its 1896 decision Plessy v. Ferguson, thereby legitimizing them through the "separate but equal" doctrine. Segregation, which began with slavery, continued with Jim Crow laws, with signs used to show Black people where they could legally walk, talk, drink, rest, or eat. For those places that were racially mixed, non-whites had to wait until all white customers were served first. Elected in 1912, President Woodrow Wilson gave in to demands by Southern members of his cabinet who ordered segregation of workplaces in the federal government.

The early 20th century is a period often referred to as the "nadir of American race relations", when the number of lynchings was highest. While tensions and civil rights violations were most intense in the South, social discrimination affected African Americans in other regions as well. At the national level, the Southern bloc controlled important committees in Congress, defeated passage of federal laws against lynching, and exercised considerable power beyond the number of whites in the South.

Characteristics of the post-Reconstruction period:

- Racial segregation. By law, public facilities and government services such as education were divided into separate "white" and "colored" domains. Characteristically, those for colored people were underfunded and of inferior quality.
- Disenfranchisement. When white Democrats regained power, they passed laws that made voter registration more restrictive, essentially forcing black voters off the voting rolls. The number of African-American voters dropped dramatically, and they were no longer able to elect representatives. From 1890 to 1908, Southern states of the former Confederacy created constitutions with provisions that disfranchised tens of thousands of African Americans, and U.S. states such as Alabama disenfranchised poor whites as well.
- Exploitation. Increased economic oppression of Black people through the convict lease system, denial of economic opportunities, and widespread employment discrimination.
- Violence. Individual, police, paramilitary, organizational, and mob racial violence against Black people.

African Americans rejected this regime. They resisted it in numerous ways and sought better opportunities through lawsuits, new organizations, political redress, and labor organizing (see the Civil rights movement (1896–1954)). The National Association for the Advancement of Colored People (NAACP) was founded in 1909. It fought to end racial discrimination through litigation, education, and lobbying efforts. Its crowning achievement was its legal victory in the Supreme Court decision Brown v. Board of Education (1954), when the Supreme Court ruled that segregation of public schools in the US was unconstitutional and, by implication, overturned the "separate but equal" doctrine established in Plessy v. Ferguson of 1896. Following the unanimous Supreme Court ruling, many states began to integrate their schools gradually, but some areas of the South resisted by closing public schools altogether.

The integration of Southern public libraries followed demonstrations and protests that used techniques seen in other elements of the larger civil rights movement. This included sit-ins, beatings, and white resistance. For example, in 1963 in the city of Anniston, Alabama, two black ministers were brutally beaten for attempting to integrate the public library. Though there was resistance and violence, the integration of libraries was generally quicker than the integration of other public institutions.

=== National issues ===
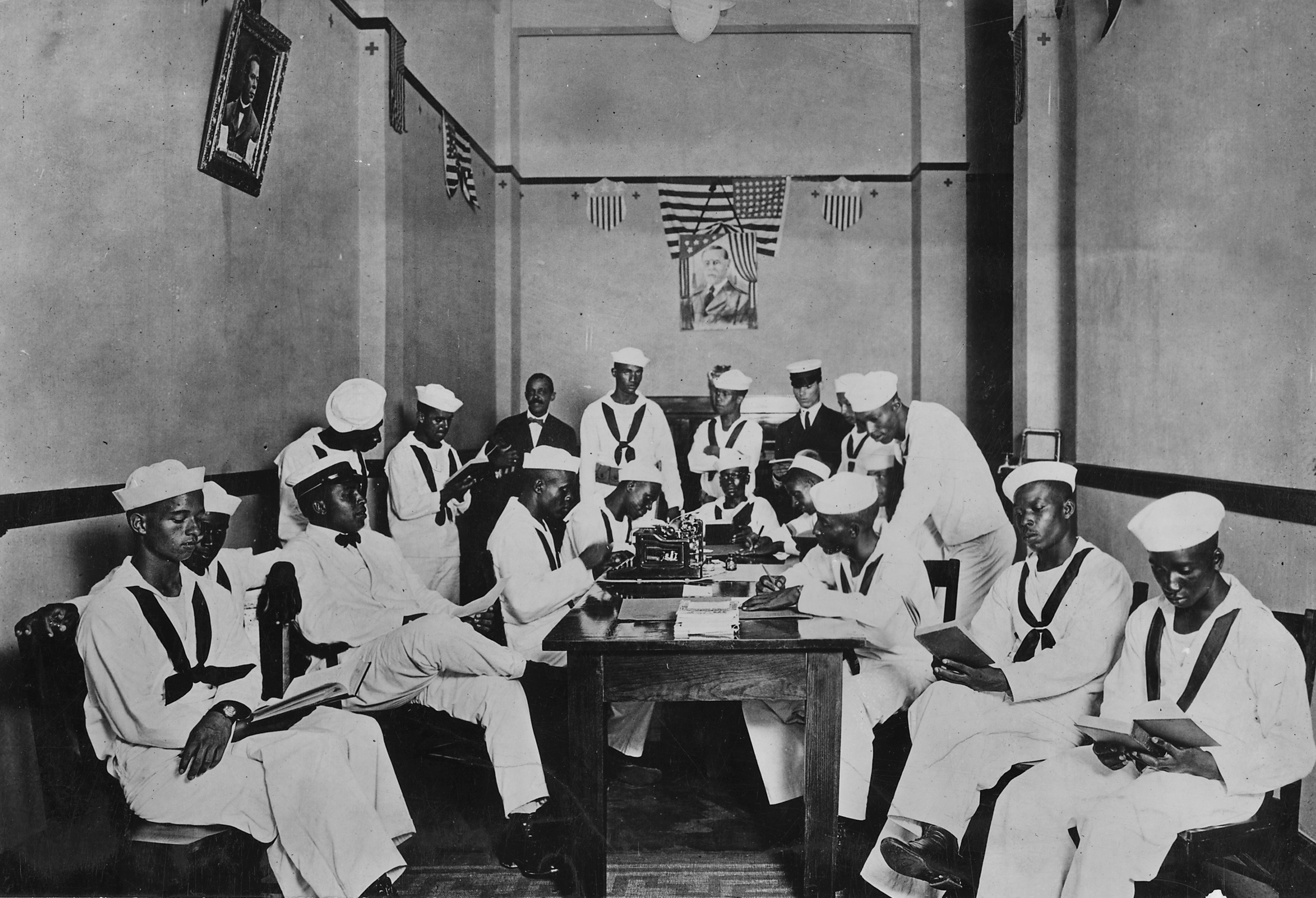
Colored Sailors room in World War I

The situation for Black people outside of the South was somewhat better (in most states, they could vote and have their children educated, though they still faced discrimination in housing and jobs). In 1900, Reverend Matthew Anderson, speaking at the annual Hampton Negro Conference in Virginia, said that "...the lines along most of the avenues of wage-earning are more rigidly drawn in the North than in the South. There seems to be an apparent effort throughout the North, especially in the cities to debar the colored worker from all the avenues of higher remunerative labor, which makes it more difficult to improve his economic condition even than in the South." From 1910 to 1970, Black people sought better lives by migrating north and west out of the South. A total of nearly seven million Black people left the South in what was known as the Great Migration, most during and after World War II. So many people migrated that the demographics of some previously black-majority states changed to a white majority (in combination with other developments). The rapid influx of Black people altered the demographics of Northern and Western cities; happening at a period of expanded European, Hispanic, and Asian immigration, it added to social competition and tensions, with the new migrants and immigrants battling for a place in jobs and housing.

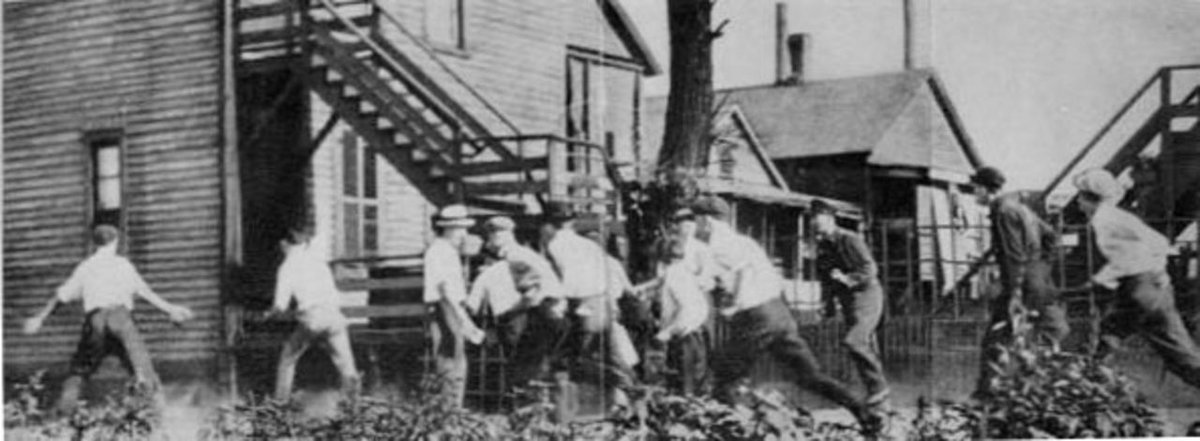
A white gang during the Chicago race riot of 1919

Reflecting social tensions after World War I, as veterans struggled to return to the workforce and labor unions were organizing, the Red Summer of 1919 was marked by hundreds of deaths and higher casualties across the U.S. as a result of white race riots against Black people that took place in more than three dozen cities. Urban problems such as crime and disease were blamed on the large influx of Southern Black people to cities in the north and west, based on stereotypes of rural southern African-Americans. Overall, Black people in Northern and Western cities experienced systemic discrimination in a plethora of aspects of life. Within employment, economic opportunities for Black people were limited to the lowest status and restrictive in potential mobility. Within the housing market, stronger discriminatory measures were used in correlation to the influx, resulting in a mix of "targeted violence, restrictive covenants, redlining and racial steering". The Great Migration resulted in many African Americans becoming urbanized, and they began to realign from the Republican to the Democratic Party, especially because of opportunities under the New Deal of the Franklin D. Roosevelt administration during the Great Depression in the 1930s. Substantially under pressure from African-American supporters who began the March on Washington Movement, President Roosevelt issued the first federal order banning discrimination and created the Fair Employment Practice Committee. After both World Wars, black military veterans pressed for full civil rights and often led activist movements. In 1948, President Harry Truman issued Executive Order 9981, which ended segregation in the military.

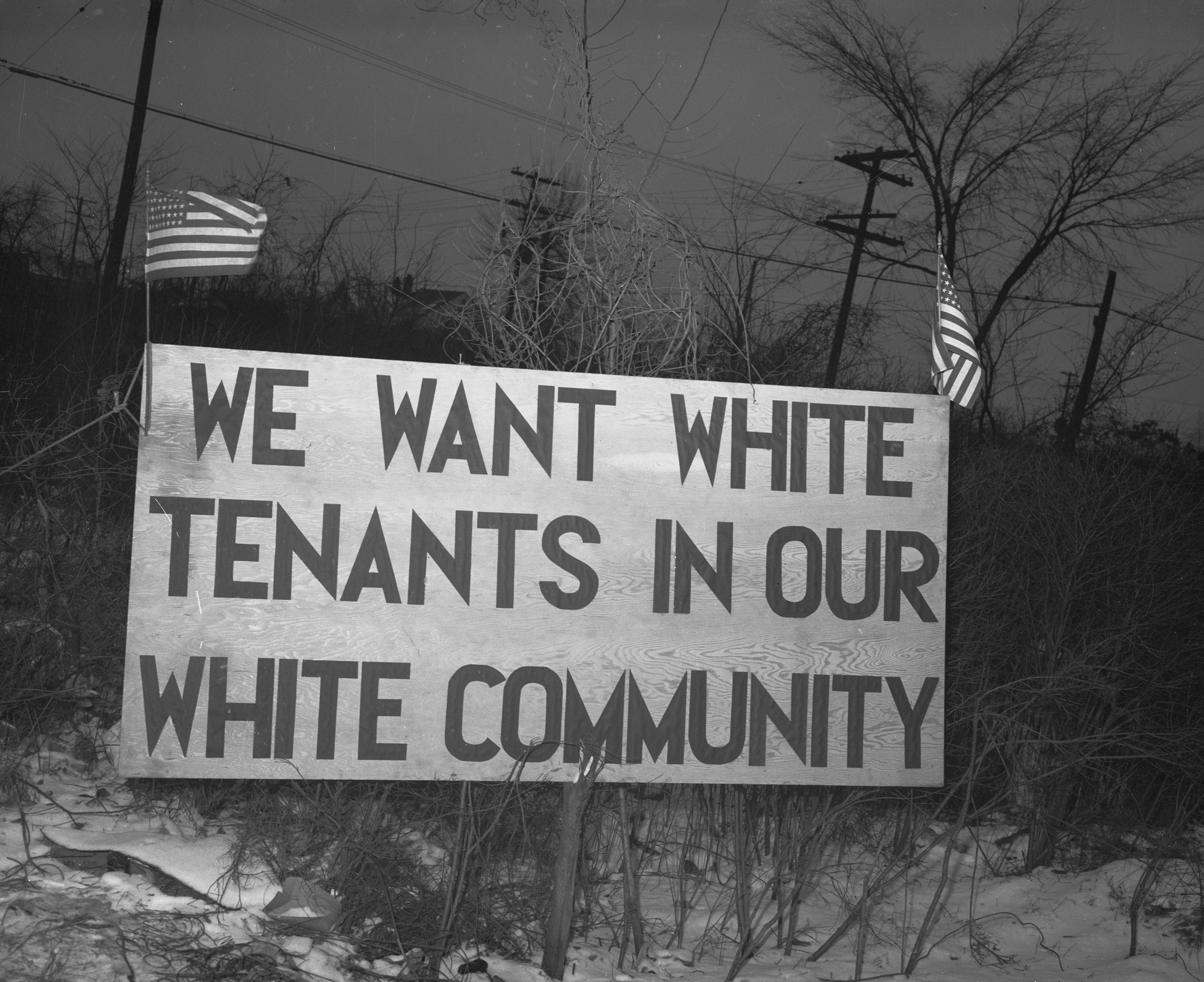
White tenants seeking to prevent Black people from moving into the housing project erected this sign, Detroit, 1942. Photograph by Arthur Siegel.

Housing segregation became a nationwide problem following the Great Migration of black people out of the South. Racial covenants were employed by many real estate developers to "protect" entire subdivisions, with the primary intent to keep "white" neighborhoods "white". Ninety percent of the housing projects built in the years following World War II were racially restricted by such covenants. Cities known for their widespread use of racial covenants include Chicago, Baltimore, Detroit, Milwaukee, Los Angeles, Seattle, and St. Louis.

Said premises shall not be rented, leased, or conveyed to, or occupied by, any person other than of the white or Caucasian race.

— Racial covenant for a home in Beverly Hills, California.

While many whites defended their space with violence, intimidation, or legal tactics toward black people, many other whites migrated to more racially homogeneous suburban or exurban regions, a process known as white flight. From the 1930s to the 1960s, the National Association of Real Estate Boards (NAREB) issued guidelines that specified that a realtor "should never be instrumental in introducing to a neighborhood a character or property or occupancy, members of any race or nationality, or any individual whose presence will be clearly detrimental to property values in a neighborhood." The result was the development of all-black ghettos in the North and West, where much housing was older, as well as South.

The first anti-miscegenation law was passed by the Maryland General Assembly in 1691, criminalizing interracial marriage. In a speech in Charleston, Illinois in 1858, Abraham Lincoln stated, "I am not, nor ever have been in favor of making voters or jurors of negroes, nor of qualifying them to hold office, nor to intermarry with white people". By the late 1800s, 38 US states had anti-miscegenation statutes. By 1924, the ban on interracial marriage was still in force in 29 states. While interracial marriage had been legal in California since 1948, in 1957, actor Sammy Davis Jr. faced a backlash for his involvement with white actress Kim Novak. Davis briefly married a black dancer in 1958 to protect himself from mob violence. In 1958, officers in Virginia entered the home of Mildred and Richard Loving and dragged them out of bed for living together as an interracial couple, on the basis that "any white person intermarry with a colored person"— or vice versa—each party "shall be guilty of a felony" and face prison terms of five years.

Invigorated by the victory of Brown and frustrated by the lack of immediate practical effect, private citizens increasingly rejected gradualist, legalistic approaches as the primary tool to bring about desegregation. They were faced with "massive resistance" in the South by proponents of racial segregation and voter suppression. In defiance, African-American activists adopted a combined strategy of direct action, nonviolence, nonviolent resistance, and many events described as civil disobedience, giving rise to the civil rights movement of 1954 to 1968.

A. Philip Randolph had planned a march on Washington, D.C., in 1941 to support demands for elimination of employment discrimination in the defense industry; he called off the march when the Roosevelt administration met the demand by issuing Executive Order 8802, which barred racial discrimination and created an agency to oversee compliance with the order.

=== Protests begin ===
The strategy of public education, legislative lobbying, and litigation that had typified the civil rights movement during the first half of the 20th century broadened after Brown to a strategy that emphasized nonviolent "direct action": economic boycotts, sit-ins, Freedom Rides, marches or walks, and similar tactics that relied on mass mobilization, nonviolent resistance, standing in line, and, at times, civil disobedience.

Churches, local grassroots organizations, fraternal societies, and black-owned businesses mobilized volunteers to participate in broad-based actions. This was a more direct and potentially more rapid means of creating change than the traditional approach of mounting court challenges used by the NAACP and others.

In 1952, the Regional Council of Negro Leadership (RCNL), led by T. R. M. Howard, a black surgeon, entrepreneur, and planter, organized a successful boycott of gas stations in Mississippi that refused to provide restrooms for Black people. Through the RCNL, Howard led campaigns to expose brutality by the Mississippi state highway patrol and to encourage Black people to make deposits in the black-owned Tri-State Bank of Nashville which, in turn, gave loans to civil rights activists who were victims of a "credit squeeze" by the White Citizens' Councils.

After Claudette Colvin was arrested for refusing to give up her seat on a Montgomery, Alabama bus in March 1955, a bus boycott was considered but rejected. But when Rosa Parks was arrested in December, Jo Ann Gibson Robinson of the Montgomery Women's Political Council launched the bus boycott. Late that night, she, John Cannon (chairman of the Business Department at Alabama State University), and others mimeographed and distributed thousands of leaflets calling for a boycott. The eventual success of the boycott made its spokesman Martin Luther King Jr., a nationally known figure. It also inspired other bus boycotts, such as the successful Tallahassee, Florida boycott of 1956–57. This movement also sparked the 1956 Sugar Bowl riots in Atlanta which later became a major organizing center of the civil rights movement, with Martin Luther King Jr.

In 1957, King and Ralph Abernathy, the leaders of the Montgomery Improvement Association, joined with other church leaders who had led similar boycott efforts, such as C. K. Steele of Tallahassee and T. J. Jemison of Baton Rouge, and other activists such as Fred Shuttlesworth, Ella Baker, A. Philip Randolph, Bayard Rustin and Stanley Levison, to form the Southern Christian Leadership Conference (SCLC). The SCLC, headquartered in Atlanta, Georgia, did not attempt to create a network of chapters as the NAACP did. It offered training and leadership assistance for local efforts to fight segregation. The headquarters organization raised funds, mostly from Northern sources, to support such campaigns. It made nonviolence both its central tenet and its primary method of confronting racism.

In 1959, Septima Clarke, Bernice Robinson, and Esau Jenkins, with the help of Myles Horton's Highlander Folk School in Tennessee, began the first Citizenship Schools in South Carolina's Sea Islands. They taught literacy to help Black people pass literacy tests. The program was an enormous success and tripled the number of black voters on Johns Island. SCLC took over the program and duplicated its results elsewhere.

== History ==
=== Brown v. Board of Education, 1954 ===
In the spring of 1951, black students in Virginia protested their unequal status in the state's segregated educational system. Students at Moton High School protested the overcrowded conditions and failing facility. Some local leaders of the NAACP had tried to persuade the students to back down from their protest against the Jim Crow laws of school segregation. When the students did not budge, the NAACP joined their battle against school segregation. The NAACP proceeded with five cases challenging the school systems; these were later combined under what is known today as Brown v. Board of Education. Under the leadership of Walter Reuther, the United Auto Workers donated $75,000 to help pay for the NAACP's efforts at the Supreme Court.

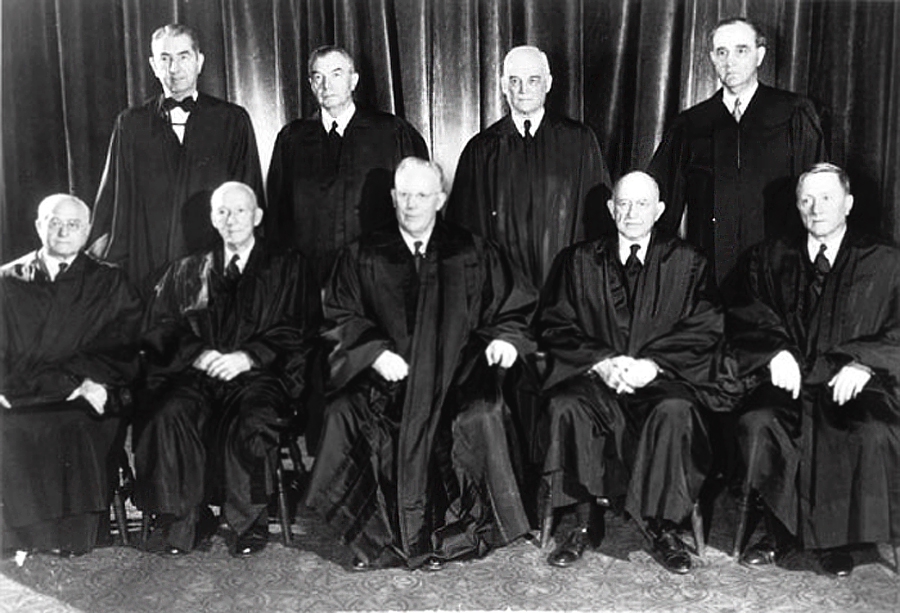
In 1954, the U.S. Supreme Court under Chief Justice Earl Warren ruled unanimously that racial segregation in public schools was unconstitutional.

On May 17, 1954, the U.S. Supreme Court under Chief Justice Earl Warren ruled unanimously in Brown v. Board of Education of Topeka, Kansas, that mandating, or even permitting, public schools to be segregated by race was unconstitutional. Chief Justice Warren wrote in the court majority opinion that

Segregation of white and colored children in public schools has a detrimental effect upon the colored children. The impact is greater when it has the sanction of the law; for the policy of separating the races is usually interpreted as denoting the inferiority of the Negro group.

The lawyers from the NAACP had to gather credible evidence to win the case of Brown vs. Board of Education. Their approach to addressing school segregation was to present several arguments. One pertained to having exposure to interracial contact in a school environment. It was argued that interracial contact would, in turn, help prepare children to live with the pressures that society exerts regarding race and thereby afford them a better chance of living in a democracy. In addition, another argument emphasized how "'education' comprehends the entire process of developing and training the mental, physical and moral powers and capabilities of human beings".

Risa Goluboff wrote that the NAACP intended to show the Courts that African American children were the victims of school segregation and their futures were at risk. The Court ruled that both Plessy v. Ferguson (1896), which had established the "separate but equal" standard in general, and Cumming v. Richmond County Board of Education (1899), which had applied that standard to schools, were unconstitutional.

The federal government filed a friend of the court brief in the case, urging the justices to consider the effect that segregation had on America's image in the Cold War. Secretary of State Dean Acheson was quoted in the brief stating that "The United States is under constant attack in the foreign press, over the foreign radio, and in such international bodies as the United Nations because of various practices of discrimination in this country."

The following year, in the case known as Brown II, the Court ordered segregation to be phased out over time, "with all deliberate speed". Brown v. Board of Education of Topeka, Kansas (1954) did not overturn Plessy v. Ferguson (1896). Plessy v. Ferguson was segregation in transportation modes. Brown v. Board of Education dealt with segregation in education. Brown v. Board of Education did set in motion the future overturning of 'separate but equal'.

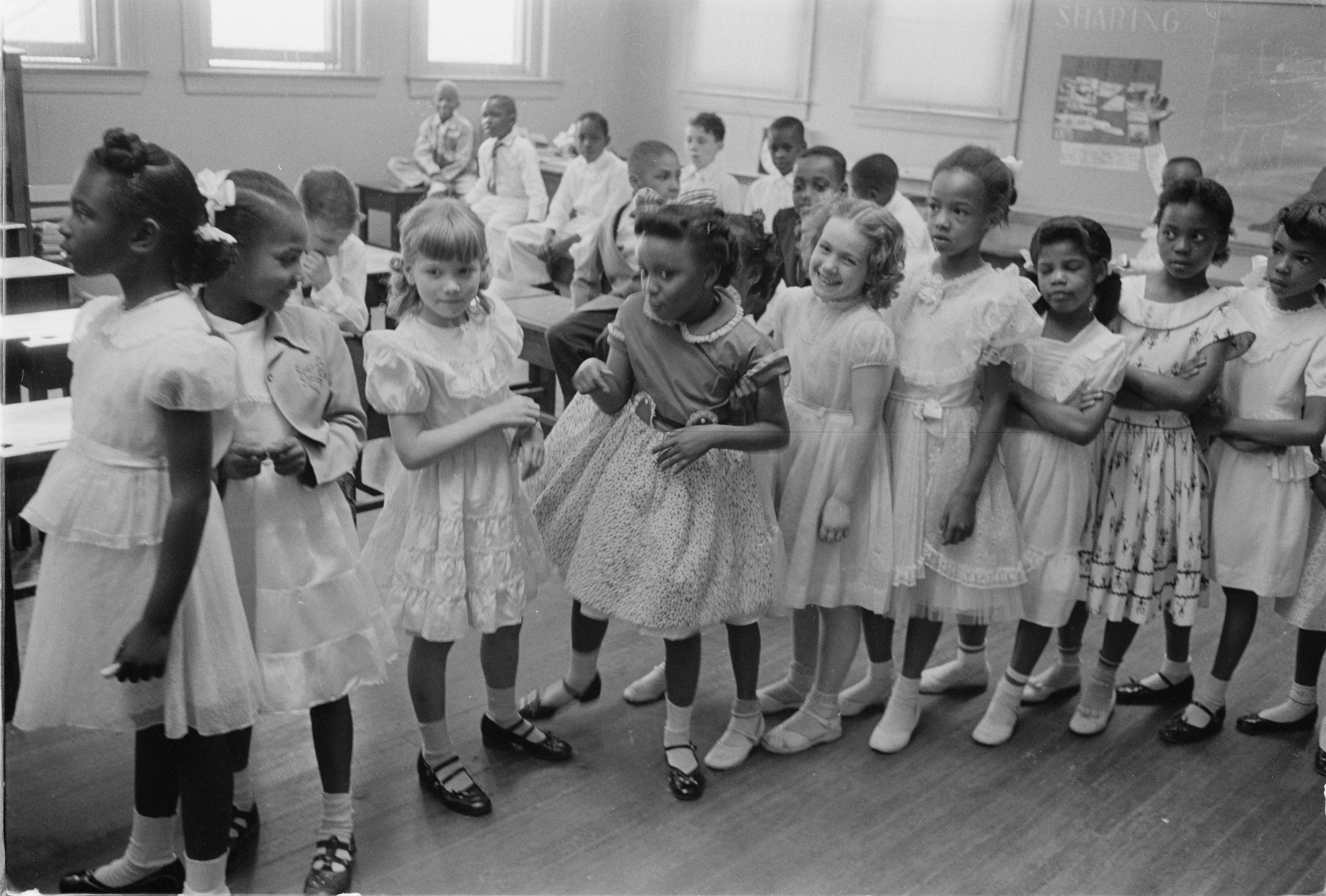
School integration, Barnard School, Washington, D.C., 1955

On May 18, 1954, Greensboro, North Carolina, became the first city in the South to publicly announce that it would abide by the Supreme Court's Brown v. Board of Education ruling. "It is unthinkable,' remarked School Board Superintendent Benjamin Smith, 'that we will try to [override] the laws of the United States." This positive reception for Brown, together with the appointment of African American David Jones to the school board in 1953, convinced numerous white and black citizens that Greensboro was heading in a progressive direction. Integration in Greensboro occurred rather peacefully compared to the process in Southern states such as Alabama, Arkansas, and Virginia, where "massive resistance" was practiced by top officials and throughout the states. In Virginia, some counties closed their public schools rather than integrate, and many white Christian private schools were founded to accommodate students who used to go to public schools. Even in Greensboro, much local resistance to desegregation continued, and in 1969, the federal government found the city was not in compliance with the 1964 Civil Rights Act. Transition to a fully integrated school system did not begin until 1971.

Many Northern cities also had de facto segregation policies, which resulted in a vast gulf in educational resources between black and white communities. In Harlem, New York, for example, neither a single new school was built since the turn of the century, nor did a single nursery school exist – even as the Second Great Migration was causing overcrowding. Existing schools tended to be dilapidated and staffed with inexperienced teachers. Brown helped stimulate activism among New York City parents like Mae Mallory who, with the support of the NAACP, initiated a successful lawsuit against the city and state on Brown's principles. Mallory and thousands of other parents bolstered the pressure on the school with a boycott in 1959. During the boycott, some of the first freedom schools were established. The city responded to the campaign by permitting more open transfers to high-quality, historically white schools. (New York's African-American community, and Northern desegregation activists generally, now found themselves contending with the problem of white flight, however.)

=== Emmett Till's murder, 1955 ===
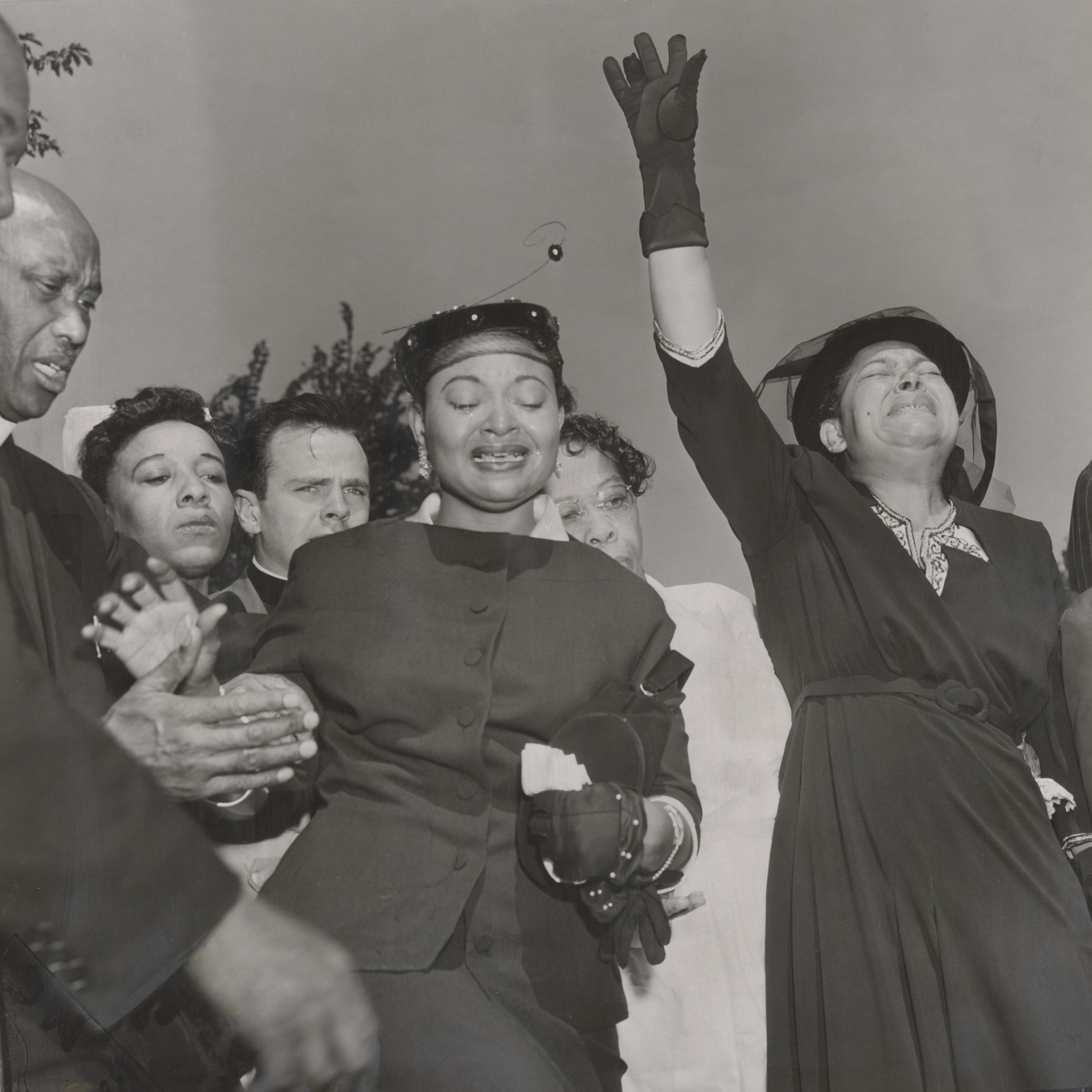
Emmett Till's mother, Mamie (middle), at her son's funeral in 1955. White men killed him after a white woman accused him of offending her in her family's grocery store.

Emmett Till, a 14-year-old African American from Chicago, visited his relatives in Money, Mississippi, for the summer. He allegedly had an interaction with a white woman, Carolyn Bryant, in a small grocery store that violated the norms of Mississippi culture, and Bryant's husband, Roy, and his half-brother, J. W. Milam, brutally murdered young Emmett Till. They beat and mutilated him before shooting him in the head and sinking his body in the Tallahatchie River. Three days later, Till's body was discovered and retrieved from the river. After Emmett's mother, Mamie Till, came to identify the remains of her son, she decided she wanted to "let the people see what I have seen". Till's mother then had his body taken back to Chicago where she had it displayed in an open casket during the funeral services where many thousands of visitors arrived to show their respects. A later publication of an image at the funeral in Jet is credited as a crucial moment in the civil rights era for displaying in vivid detail the violent racism that was being directed at black people in America. In a column for The Atlantic, Vann R. Newkirk wrote: "The trial of his killers became a pageant illuminating the tyranny of white supremacy". The state of Mississippi tried two defendants, but they were speedily acquitted by an all-white jury.

"Emmett's murder," historian Tim Tyson writes, "would never have become a watershed historical moment without Mamie finding the strength to make her private grief a public matter." The visceral response to his mother's decision to have an open-casket funeral mobilized the black community throughout the U.S. The murder and resulting trial ended up markedly impacting the views of several young black activists. Joyce Ladner referred to such activists as the "Emmett Till generation." One hundred days after Emmett Till's murder, Rosa Parks refused to give up her seat on the bus in Montgomery, Alabama. Parks later informed Till's mother that her decision to stay in her seat was guided by the image she still vividly recalled of Till's brutalized remains. The glass-topped casket that was used for Till's Chicago funeral was found in a cemetery garage in 2009. Till had been reburied in a different casket after being exhumed in 2005. Till's family decided to donate the original casket to the Smithsonian's National Museum of African American Culture and History, where it is now on display. In 2007, Bryant said that she had fabricated the most sensational part of her story in 1955.

=== Rosa Parks and the Montgomery bus boycott, 1955–1956 ===
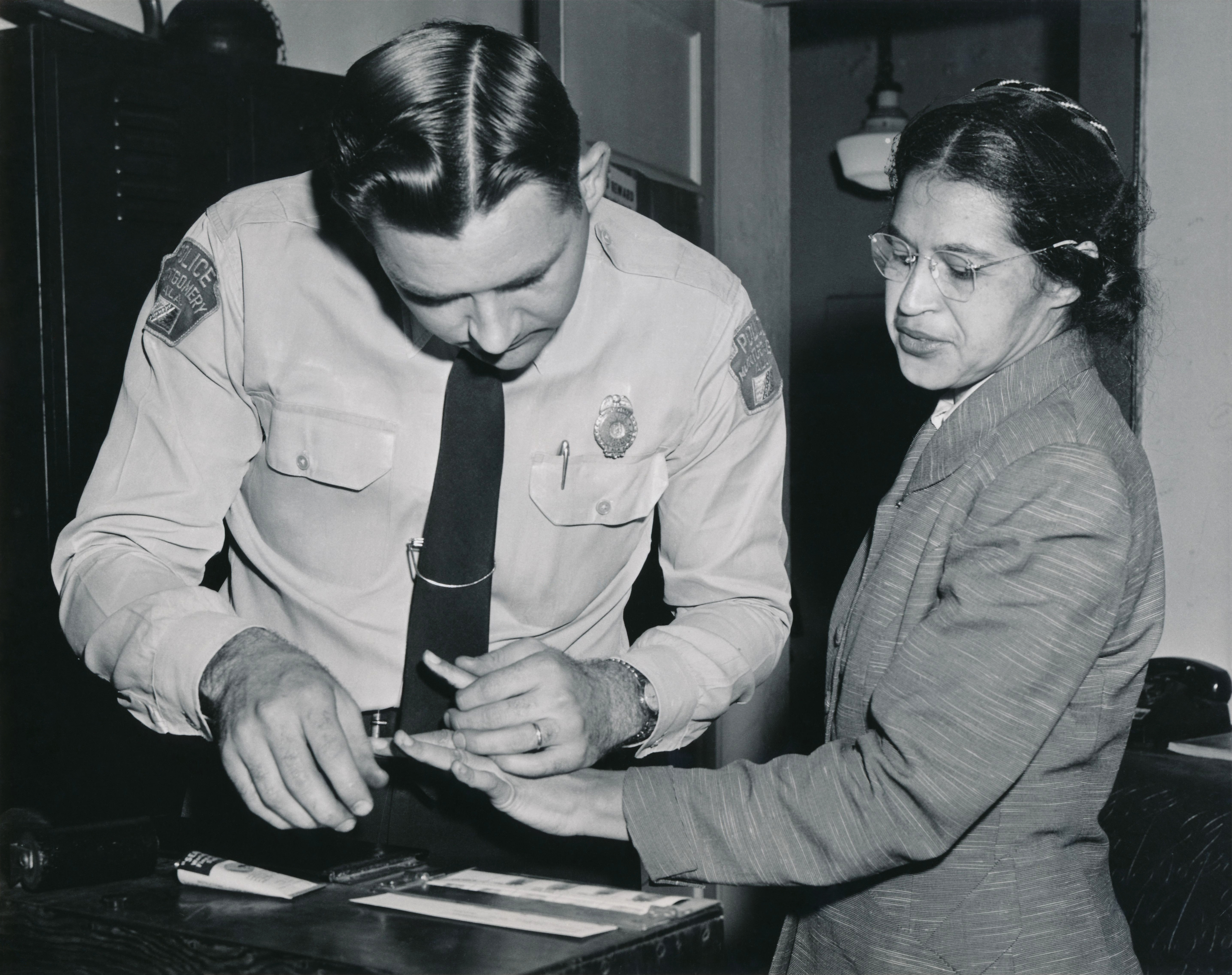
Rosa Parks being fingerprinted after being arrested for not giving up her seat on a bus to a white person.

On December 1, 1955, nine months after a 15-year-old high school student, Claudette Colvin, refused to give up her seat to a white passenger on a public bus in Montgomery, Alabama, and was arrested, Rosa Parks did the same thing. Parks soon became the symbol of the resulting Montgomery bus boycott and received national publicity. She was later hailed as the "mother of the civil rights movement".

Parks was secretary of the Montgomery NAACP chapter and had recently returned from a meeting at the Highlander Folk School in Tennessee, where nonviolence as a strategy was taught by Myles Horton and others. After Parks' arrest, African Americans organized the Montgomery bus boycott to demand equal treatment on buses. The organization was led by Jo Ann Robinson, a member of the Women's Political Council who had been waiting for the opportunity to boycott the bus system. Following Rosa Parks' arrest, Jo Ann Robinson mimeographed 52,500 leaflets calling for a boycott. They were distributed around the city and helped gather the attention of civil rights leaders. After the city rejected many of its suggested reforms, the NAACP, led by E. D. Nixon, pushed for full desegregation of public buses. With the support of most of Montgomery's 50,000 African Americans, the boycott lasted for 381 days, until the local ordinance segregating African Americans and whites on public buses was repealed. 90% of African Americans in Montgomery participated in the boycotts, which significantly reduced bus revenue because they comprised the majority of riders. This movement also sparked riots leading up to the 1956 Sugar Bowl. In November 1956, the United States Supreme Court upheld a district court ruling in the case of Browder v. Gayle and ordered Montgomery's buses desegregated, ending the boycott.

Local leaders established the Montgomery Improvement Association to focus their efforts. Martin Luther King Jr. was elected President of this organization. The lengthy protest attracted national attention for him and the city. His eloquent appeals to Christian brotherhood and American idealism created a positive impression on people both inside and outside the South.

=== Little Rock Nine, 1957 ===
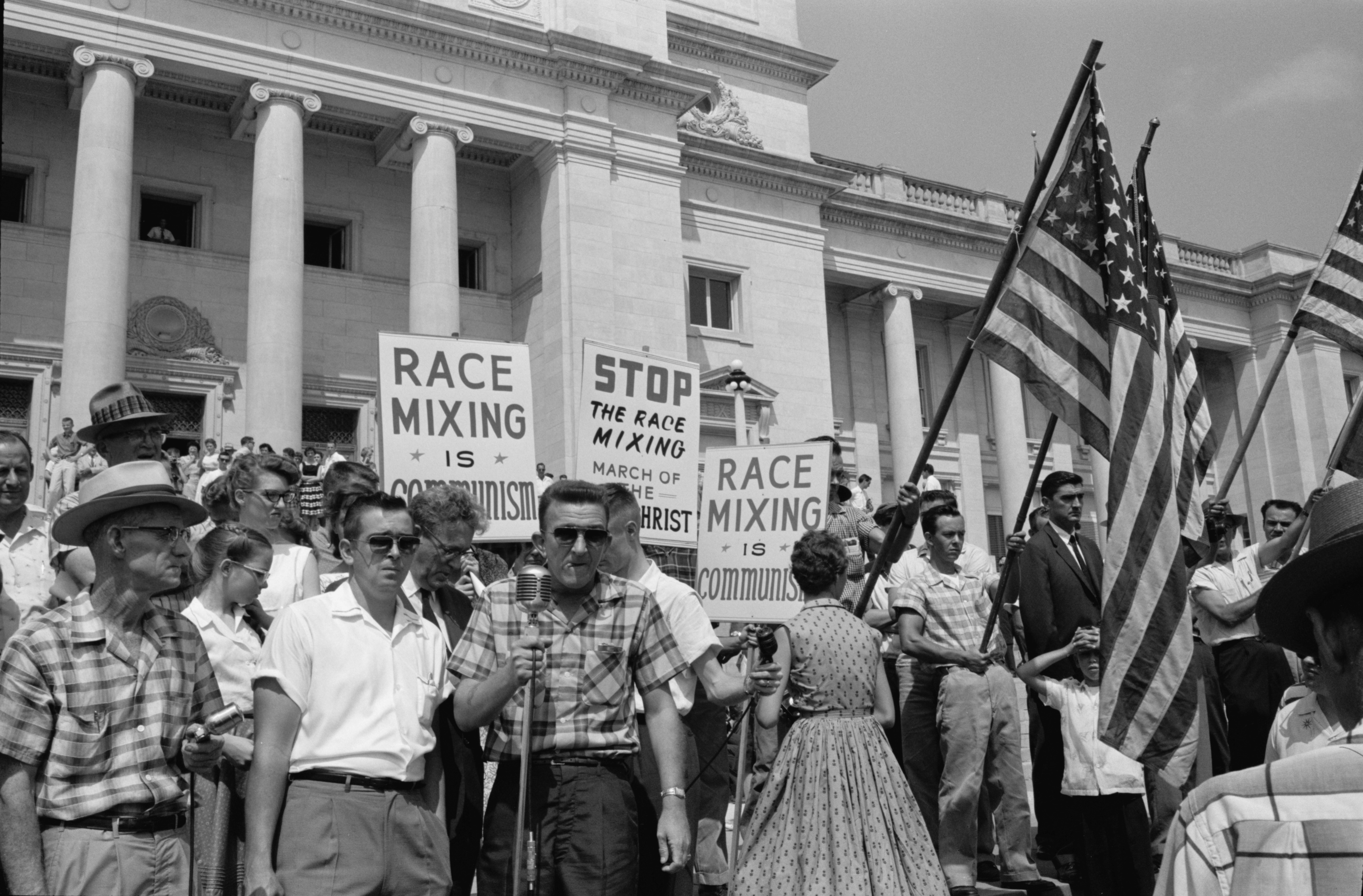
White parents rally against integrating Little Rock's schools in August 1959.

The Little Rock Nine were a group of nine students who attended segregated black high schools in Little Rock, the capital of Arkansas. They each volunteered when the NAACP and the national civil rights movement obtained federal court orders to integrate the prestigious Little Rock Central High School in September, 1957. The Nine faced intense harassment and threats of violence from white parents and students, as well as organized white supremacist groups. The enraged opposition emphasized miscegenation as a threat to white society. Arkansas Governor, Orval Faubus, claiming his only goal was to preserve the peace, deployed the Arkansas National Guard to prevent the black students from entering the school. Faubus defied federal court orders, whereupon President Dwight D. Eisenhower intervened. He federalized the Arkansas National Guard and sent them home. Then he sent in an elite Army unit to escort the students to school and protect them between classes during the 1957–58 school year. In class, however, the Nine were teased and ridiculed every day. In the city, compromise efforts all failed, and political tensions continued to fester. A year later, in September 1958, the Supreme Court ruled that all the city's high schools had to be integrated immediately. Governor Faubus and the legislature responded by immediately closing all the city's public high schools for the entire 1958–1959 school year, despite the harm it caused to all the students. The decision to integrate the school was a landmark event in the civil rights movement, and the students' bravery and determination in the face of violent opposition are remembered as a key moment in American history. The city and state were entangled in very expensive legal disputes for decades, while suffering a reputation for hatred and obstruction.

=== Method of nonviolence and nonviolence training ===
During the period considered the "African-American civil rights" era, the predominant form of protest was nonviolent, or peaceful. Often referred to as pacifism, the method of nonviolence is considered to be an attempt to impact society positively. Although acts of racial discrimination have occurred historically throughout the United States, perhaps the most violent regions have been in the former Confederate states. During the 1950s and 1960s, the nonviolent protests of the civil rights movement sparked significant tension and drew national attention.

To prepare for protests, both physically and psychologically, demonstrators received nonviolence training. According to former civil rights activist Bruce Hartford, there are two main components of nonviolence training. There is the philosophical method, which involves understanding the method of nonviolence and why it is considered useful; there is the tactical method, which ultimately teaches demonstrators "how to be a protestor—how to sit-in, how to picket, how to defend yourself against attack, giving training on how to remain cool when people are screaming racist insults into your face and pouring stuff on you and hitting you" (Civil Rights Movement Archive). The philosophical basis of the practice of nonviolence in the American civil rights movement was largely inspired by Mahatma Gandhi's "non-cooperation" policies during his involvement in the Indian independence movement, which were intended to gain attention so that the public would either "intervene in advance" or "provide public pressure in support of the action to be taken" (Erikson, 415). As Hartford explains it, philosophical nonviolence training aims to "shape the individual person's attitude and mental response to crises and violence" (Civil Rights Movement Archive). Hartford and activists like him, who trained in tactical nonviolence, considered it necessary to ensure physical safety, instill discipline, teach demonstrators how to demonstrate, and form confidence among demonstrators (Civil Rights Movement Archive).

For many, the concept of nonviolent protest was a way of life, a culture. However, not everyone agreed with this notion. James Forman, former SNCC (and later Black Panther) member and nonviolence trainer, was among those who did not. In his autobiography, The Making of Black Revolutionaries, Forman revealed his perspective on nonviolence as "strictly a tactic, not a way of life without limitations." Similarly, Bob Moses, who was also an active member of the SNCC, believed that nonviolence was practical. When interviewed by author Robert Penn Warren, Moses said "There's no question that he (Martin Luther King Jr.) had a great deal of influence with the masses. But I don't think it's in the direction of love. It's in a practical direction … ." (Who Speaks for the Negro? Warren).

According to a 2020 study in the American Political Science Review, nonviolent civil rights protests boosted Democratic vote shares in nearby counties, but violent protests substantially boosted white support for Republicans in counties near them.

=== Sit-ins, 1958–1960 ===
In July 1958, the NAACP Youth Council sponsored sit-ins at the lunch counter of a Dockum Drug Store in downtown Wichita, Kansas. After three weeks, the movement successfully secured the store's change in its segregated seating policy, and soon afterward, all Dockum stores in Kansas were desegregated. This movement was quickly followed in the same year by a student sit-in at a Katz Drug Store in Oklahoma City led by Clara Luper, which was also successful.

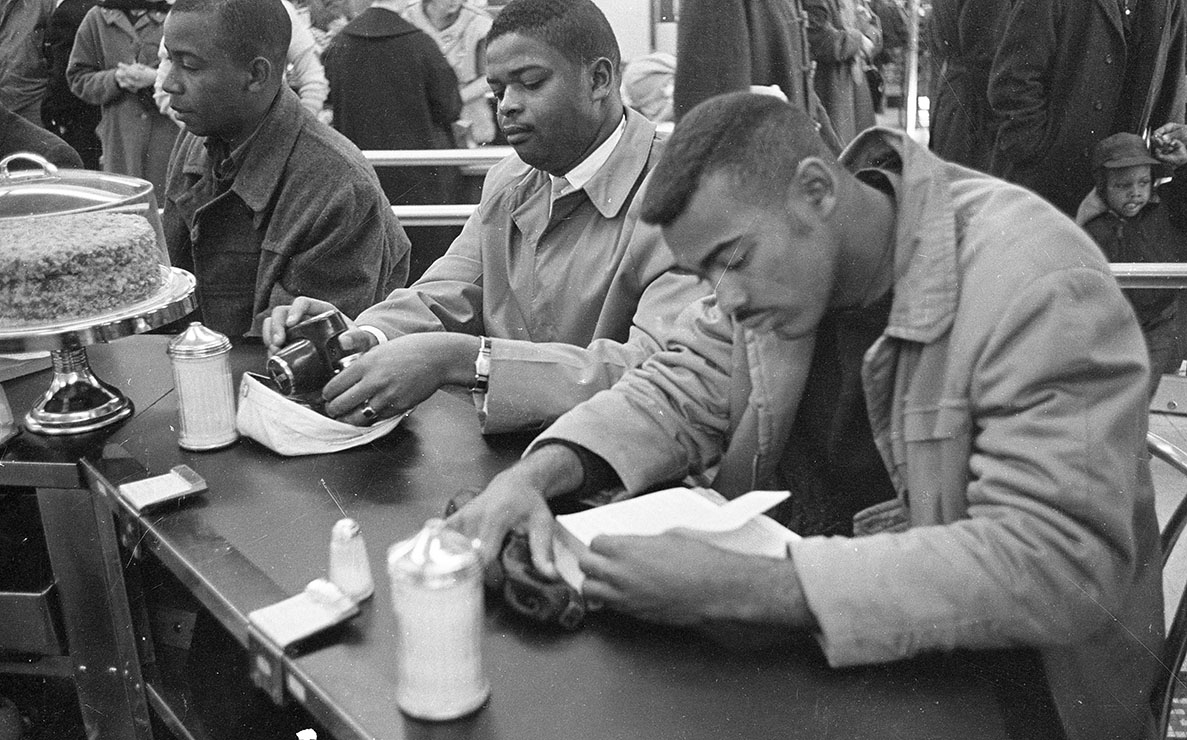
Student sit-in at Woolworth in Durham, North Carolina on February 10, 1960.

Mostly black students from area colleges led a sit-in at a Woolworth's store in Greensboro, North Carolina. On February 1, 1960, four students, Ezell A. Blair Jr., David Richmond, Joseph McNeil, and Franklin McCain from North Carolina Agricultural & Technical College, an all-black college, sat down at the segregated lunch counter to protest Woolworth's policy of excluding African Americans from being served food there. The four students purchased small items in other parts of the store and kept their receipts, then sat down at the lunch counter and asked to be served. After being denied service, they produced their receipts and asked why their money was accepted everywhere else in the store but not at the lunch counter.

The protesters had been encouraged to dress professionally, to sit quietly, and to occupy every other stool so that potential white sympathizers could join in. Other sit-ins quickly followed the Greensboro sit-in in Richmond, Virginia; Nashville, Tennessee; and Atlanta, Georgia. The most immediately effective of these was in Nashville, where hundreds of well organized and highly disciplined college students conducted sit-ins in coordination with a boycott campaign. As students across the South began to "sit-in" at the lunch counters of local stores, police and other officials sometimes used brutal force to physically escort the demonstrators from the lunch facilities.

The "sit-in" technique was not new—as far back as 1939, African-American attorney Samuel Wilbert Tucker organized a sit-in at the then-segregated Alexandria, Virginia, library. In 1960, the technique succeeded in bringing national attention to the movement. On March 9, 1960, an Atlanta University Center group of students released An Appeal for Human Rights as a full-page advertisement in newspapers, including the Atlanta Constitution, Atlanta Journal, and Atlanta Daily World. Known as the Committee on Appeal for Human Rights (COAHR), the group initiated the Atlanta Student Movement and began to lead sit-ins starting on March 15, 1960. By the end of 1960, the process of sit-ins had spread to every southern and border state, and even to facilities in Nevada, Illinois, and Ohio that discriminated against Black people.

Demonstrators focused not only on lunch counters but also on parks, beaches, libraries, theaters, museums, and other public facilities. In April 1960, activists who had led these sit-ins were invited by SCLC activist Ella Baker to hold a conference at Shaw University, a historically black university in Raleigh, North Carolina. This conference led to the formation of the Student Nonviolent Coordinating Committee (SNCC). SNCC took these tactics of nonviolent confrontation further, and organized the freedom rides. As the Constitution protected interstate commerce, they decided to challenge segregation on interstate buses and in public bus facilities by putting interracial teams on them to travel from the North through the segregated South.

=== Freedom Rides, 1961 ===
Freedom Rides were journeys by civil rights activists on interstate buses into the segregated southern United States to test the United States Supreme Court decision Boynton v. Virginia (1960), which ruled that segregation was unconstitutional for passengers engaged in interstate travel. Organized by CORE, the first Freedom Ride of the 1960s left Washington, D.C., on May 4, 1961, and was scheduled to arrive in New Orleans on May 17.

During the first and subsequent Freedom Rides, activists traveled through the Deep South to integrate seating patterns on buses and desegregate bus terminals, including restrooms and water fountains. That proved to be a dangerous mission. In Anniston, Alabama, one bus was firebombed, forcing its passengers to flee for their lives.

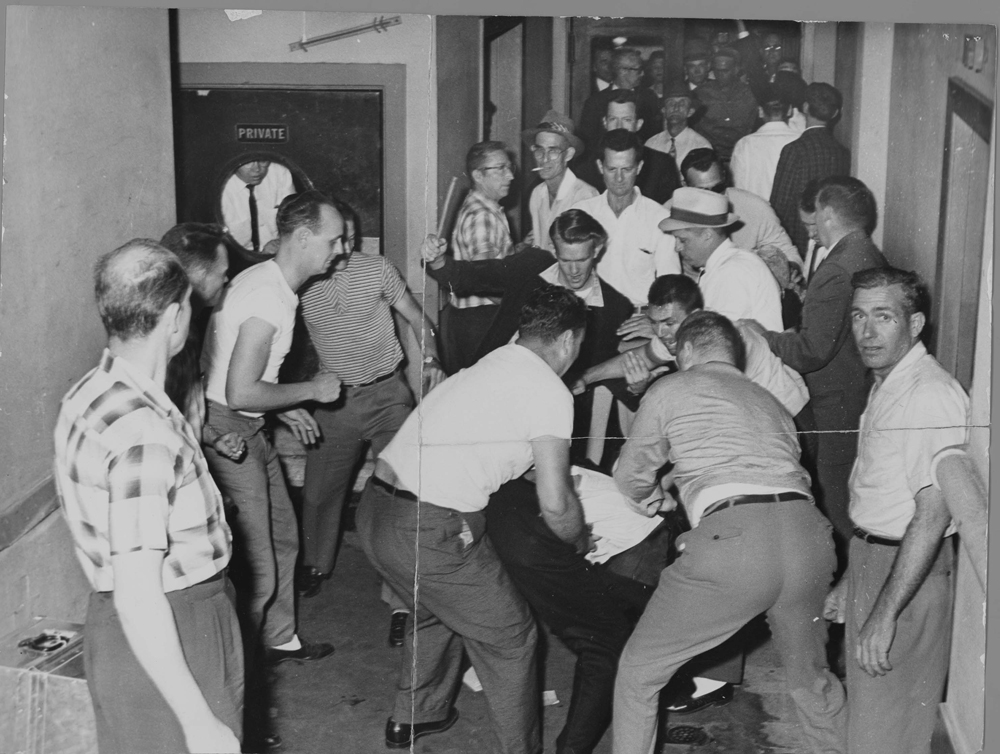
A mob beats Freedom Riders in Birmingham. The FBI reclaimed this picture from a local journalist who was also beaten and whose camera was smashed.

In Birmingham, Alabama, an FBI informant reported that Public Safety Commissioner Eugene "Bull" Connor gave Ku Klux Klan members fifteen minutes to attack an incoming group of freedom riders before having police "protect" them. The riders were severely beaten "until it looked like a bulldog had got a hold of them." James Peck, a white activist, was beaten so badly that he required fifty stitches to his head.

In a similar occurrence in Montgomery, Alabama, the Freedom Riders followed in the footsteps of Rosa Parks and rode an integrated Greyhound bus from Birmingham. Although they were protesting interstate bus segregation in peace, they were met with violence in Montgomery as a large, white mob attacked them for their activism. They caused an enormous, 2-hour-long riot, which resulted in 22 injuries, five of whom were hospitalized.

Mob violence in Anniston and Birmingham temporarily halted the rides. SNCC activists from Nashville brought in new riders to continue the journey from Birmingham to New Orleans. In Montgomery, Alabama, at the Greyhound Bus Station, a mob charged another busload of riders, knocking John Lewis unconscious with a crate and smashing Life photographer Don Urbrock in the face with his own camera. A dozen men surrounded James Zwerg, a white student from Fisk University, and beat him in the face with a suitcase, knocking out his teeth.

On May 24, 1961, the freedom riders continued their rides into Jackson, Mississippi, where they were arrested for "breaching the peace" by using "white only" facilities. New Freedom Rides were organized by various groups and continued to flow into the South. As riders arrived in Jackson, they were arrested. By the end of summer, more than 300 had been jailed in Mississippi.

… When the weary Riders arrive in Jackson and attempt to use "white only" restrooms and lunch counters they are immediately arrested for Breach of Peace and Refusal to Obey an Officer. Says Mississippi Governor Ross Barnett in defense of segregation: "The Negro is different because God made him different to punish him." From lockup, the Riders announce "Jail No Bail"—they will not pay fines for unconstitutional arrests and illegal convictions—and by staying in jail they keep the issue alive. Each prisoner will remain in jail for 39 days, the maximum time they can serve without losing their right to appeal the unconstitutionality of their arrests, trials, and convictions. After 39 days, they file an appeal and post bond...

The jailed freedom riders were treated harshly, crammed into tiny, filthy cells, and sporadically beaten. In Jackson, some male prisoners were forced to do hard labor in 100 °F (38 °C) heat. Others were transferred to the Mississippi State Penitentiary at Parchman, where they were treated to harsh conditions. Sometimes the men were suspended from the walls by "wrist breakers". Typically, the windows of their cells were shut tight on hot days, making it hard for them to breathe.

Public sympathy and support for the freedom riders led John F. Kennedy's administration to order the Interstate Commerce Commission (ICC) to issue a new desegregation order. When the new ICC rule took effect on November 1, 1961, passengers were permitted to sit wherever they chose on the bus; "white" and "colored" signs came down in the terminals; separate drinking fountains, toilets, and waiting rooms were consolidated; and lunch counters began serving people regardless of skin color.

The student movement involved such celebrated figures as John Lewis, a single-minded activist; James Lawson, the revered "guru" of nonviolent theory and tactics; Diane Nash, an articulate and intrepid public champion of justice; Bob Moses, pioneer of voting registration in Mississippi; and James Bevel, a fiery preacher and charismatic organizer, strategist, and facilitator. Other prominent student activists included Dion Diamond, Charles McDew, Bernard Lafayette, Charles Jones, Lonnie King, Julian Bond, Hosea Williams, and Stokely Carmichael.

=== Voter registration organizing ===
After the Freedom Rides, local black leaders in Mississippi, such as Amzie Moore, Aaron Henry, Medgar Evers, and others asked SNCC to help register black voters and to build community organizations that could win a share of political power in the state. Since Mississippi ratified its new constitution in 1890 with provisions such as poll taxes, residency requirements, and literacy tests, it made registration more complicated and stripped Black people from the voter rolls and voting. Also, violence at the time of elections had earlier suppressed black voting.

By the mid-20th century, preventing Black people from voting had become an essential part of the culture of white supremacy. In June and July 1959, members of the black community in Fayette County, TN, formed the Fayette County Civic and Welfare League to spur voting. At the time, there were 16,927 Black people in the county, yet only 17 of them had voted in the previous seven years. Within a year, some 1,400 Black people had registered, and the white community responded with harsh economic reprisals. Using registration rolls, the White Citizens Council circulated a blacklist of all registered black voters, allowing banks, local stores, and gas stations to conspire to deny registered black voters essential services. What's more, sharecropping Black people who registered to vote were getting evicted from their homes. All in all, the number of evictions came to 257 families, many of whom were forced to live in a makeshift Tent City for well over a year. Finally, in December 1960, the Justice Department invoked its powers under the Civil Rights Act of 1957 to file a lawsuit against 70 parties accused of violating the civil rights of black citizens of Fayette County. In the following year, the first voter registration project in McComb and the surrounding counties in the Southwest corner of the state. Their efforts were met with violent repression from state and local law enforcement officers, the White Citizens' Council, and the Ku Klux Klan. Activists were beaten, there were hundreds of arrests of local citizens, and the voting activist Herbert Lee was murdered.

White opposition to black voter registration was so intense in Mississippi that Freedom Movement activists concluded that all of the state's civil rights organizations had to unite in a coordinated effort to have any chance of success. In February 1962, representatives of SNCC, CORE, and the NAACP formed the Council of Federated Organizations (COFO). At a subsequent meeting in August, SCLC became part of COFO.

In the Spring of 1962, with funds from the Voter Education Project, SNCC/COFO began voter registration organizing in the Mississippi Delta area around Greenwood, and the areas surrounding Hattiesburg, Laurel, and Holly Springs. As in McComb, their efforts were met with fierce opposition—arrests, beatings, shootings, arson, and murder. Registrars used the literacy test to keep Black people off the voting rolls by creating standards that even highly educated people could not meet. In addition, employers fired Black people who tried to register, and landlords evicted them from their rental homes. Despite these actions, over the following years, the black voter registration campaign spread across the state.

Similar voter registration campaigns—with similar responses—were begun by SNCC, CORE, and SCLC in Louisiana, Alabama, southwest Georgia, and South Carolina. By 1963, voter registration campaigns in the South were as integral to the Freedom Movement as desegregation efforts. After the passage of the Civil Rights Act of 1964, protecting and facilitating voter registration despite state barriers became the main effort of the movement. It resulted in the passage of the Voting Rights Act of 1965, which had provisions to enforce the constitutional right to vote for all citizens.

=== Integration of Mississippi universities, 1956–1965 ===
Beginning in 1956, Clyde Kennard, a black Korean War-veteran, wanted to enroll at Mississippi Southern College (now the University of Southern Mississippi) at Hattiesburg under the G.I. Bill. William David McCain, the college president, used the Mississippi State Sovereignty Commission to prevent his enrollment by appealing to local black leaders and the segregationist state political establishment.

The state-funded organization tried to counter the civil rights movement by positively portraying segregationist policies. More significantly, it collected data on activists, harassed them legally, and used economic boycotts against them by threatening their jobs (or causing them to lose their jobs) to try to suppress their work.

Kennard was twice arrested on trumped-up charges, and eventually convicted and sentenced to seven years in the state prison. After three years at hard labor, Kennard was paroled by Mississippi Governor Ross Barnett. Journalists had investigated his case and publicized the state's mistreatment of his colon cancer.

McCain's role in Kennard's arrests and convictions is unknown. While trying to prevent Kennard's enrollment, McCain made a speech in Chicago, with his travel sponsored by the Mississippi State Sovereignty Commission. He described the people seeking to desegregate Southern schools as "imports" from the North. (Kennard was a native and resident of Hattiesburg.) McCain said:

We insist that educationally and socially, we maintain a segregated society...In all fairness, I admit that we are not encouraging Negro voting...The Negroes prefer that control of the government remain in the white man's hands.

Note: Mississippi had passed a new constitution in 1890 that effectively disfranchised most Black people by changing electoral and voter registration requirements; although it deprived them of constitutional rights authorized under post-Civil War amendments, it survived U.S. Supreme Court challenges at the time. It was not until after the passage of the 1965 Voting Rights Act that most Black people in Mississippi and other southern states gained federal protection to enforce their constitutional right to vote.

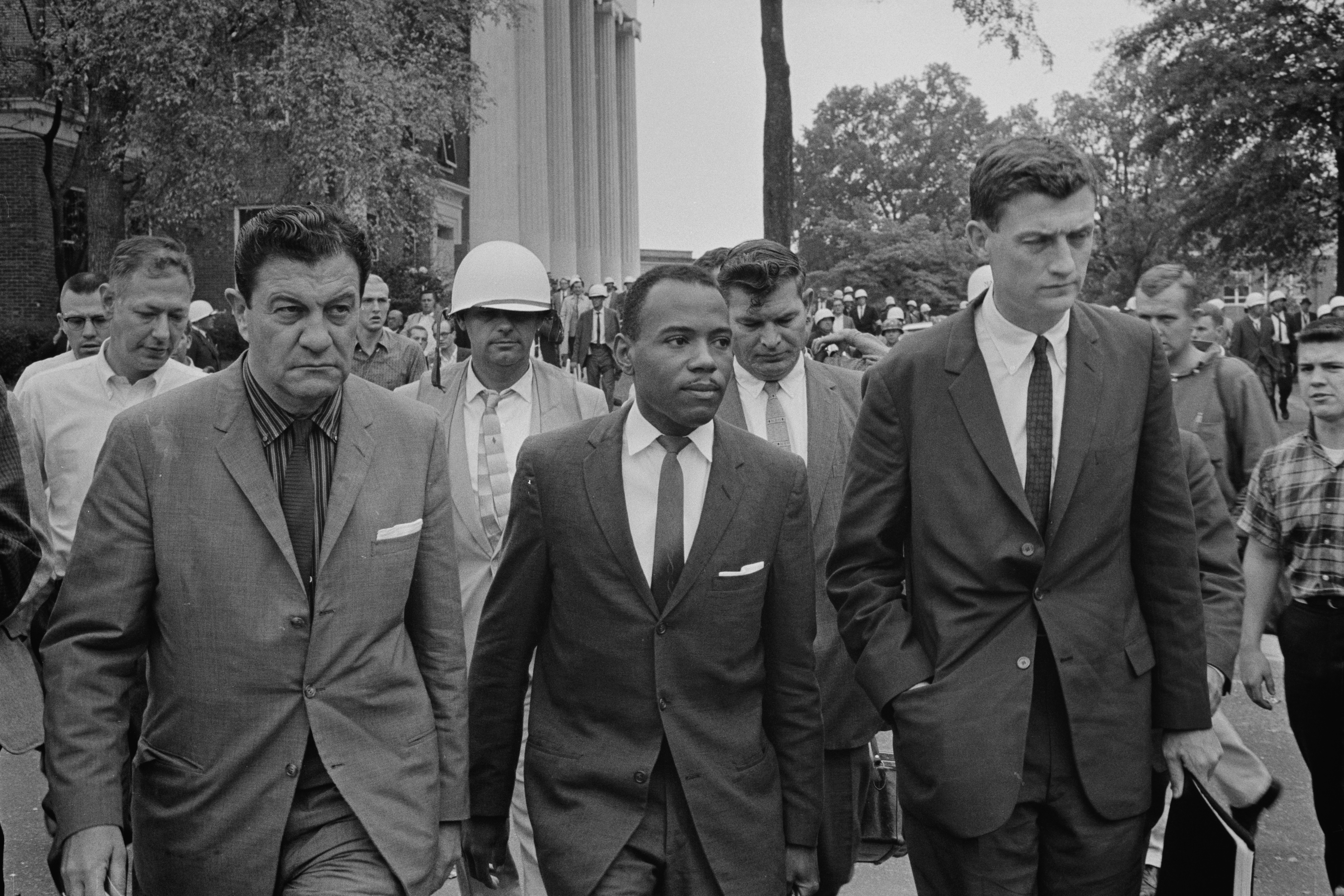
James Meredith walking to class accompanied by a U.S. Marshal and a Justice Department official.

In September 1962, James Meredith won a lawsuit to secure admission to the previously segregated University of Mississippi. He attempted to enter campus on September 20, on September 25, and again on September 26. He was blocked by Governor Ross Barnett, who said, "[N]o school will be integrated in Mississippi while I am your Governor." The Fifth U.S. Circuit Court of Appeals held Barnett and Lieutenant Governor Paul B. Johnson Jr. in contempt, ordering them arrested and fined more than $10,000 for each day they refused to allow Meredith to enroll.

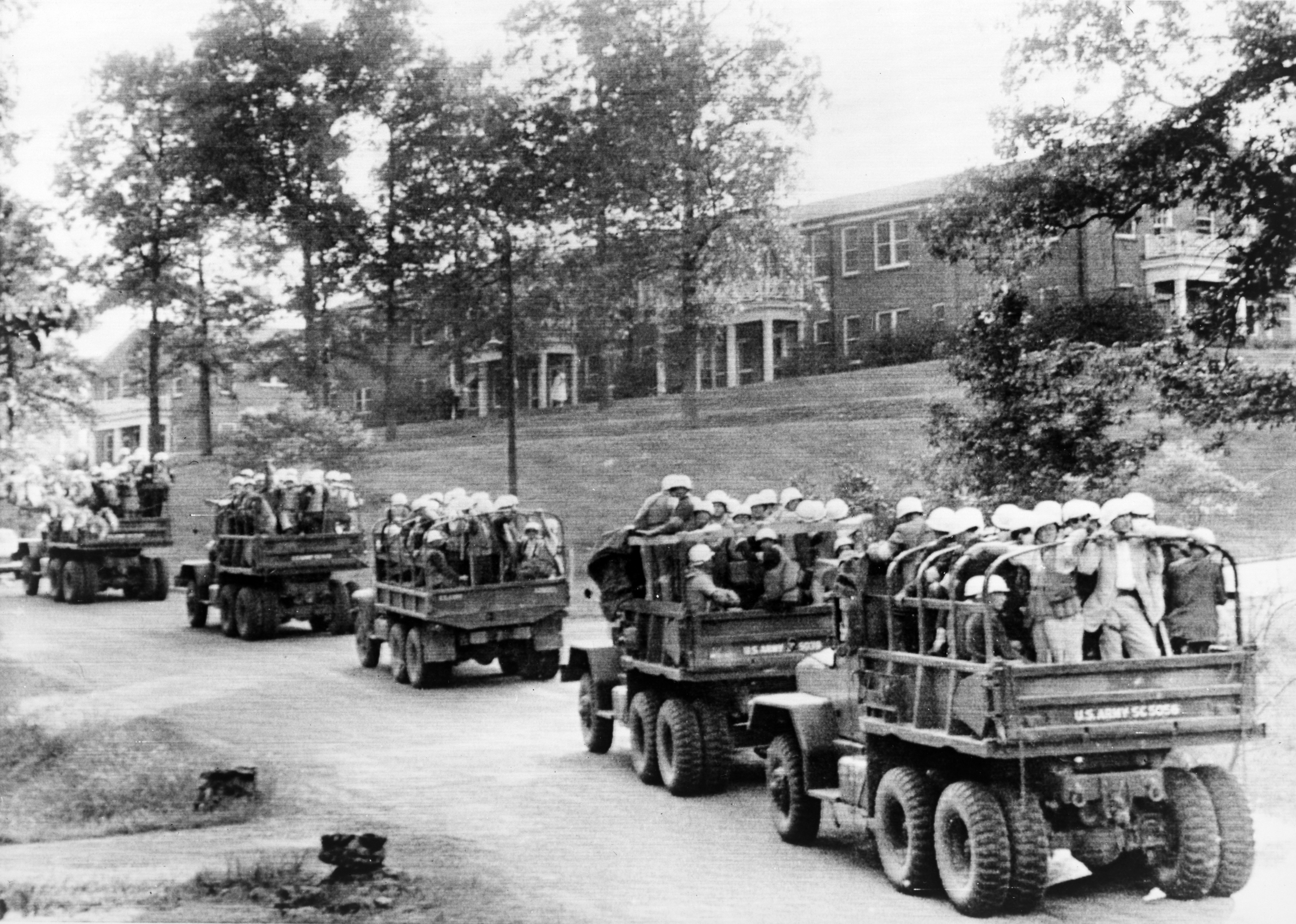
U.S. Army trucks loaded with Federal law enforcement personnel on the University of Mississippi campus, 1962.

Attorney General Robert F. Kennedy sent in a force of U.S. Marshals and deputized U.S. Border Patrol agents and Federal Bureau of Prisons officers. On September 30, 1962, Meredith entered the campus under their escort. Students and other whites began rioting that evening, throwing rocks and firing on the federal agents guarding Meredith at Lyceum Hall. Rioters ended up killing two civilians, including a French journalist; 28 federal agents suffered gunshot wounds, and 160 others were injured. President John F. Kennedy sent U.S. Army and federalized Mississippi National Guard forces to the campus to quell the riot. Meredith began classes the day after the troops arrived.

Kennard and other activists continued to work on public university desegregation. In 1965, Raylawni Branch and Gwendolyn Elaine Armstrong became the first African-American students to attend the University of Southern Mississippi. By that time, McCain helped ensure they had a peaceful entry. In 2006, Judge Robert Helfrich ruled that Kennard was factually innocent of all charges for which he had been convicted in the 1950s.

=== Albany Movement, 1961–1962 ===
The SCLC, which some student activists had criticized for its failure to participate more fully in the freedom rides, committed much of its prestige and resources to a desegregation campaign in Albany, Georgia, in November 1961. King, who had been criticized personally by some SNCC activists for his distance from the dangers that local organizers faced—and given the derisive nickname "De Lawd" as a result—intervened personally to assist the campaign led by both SNCC organizers and local leaders.

The campaign was a failure because of the cunning tactics of Laurie Pritchett, the local police chief, and divisions within the black community. The goals may not have been specific enough. Pritchett contained the marchers without resorting to violent attacks on demonstrators that would inflame national opinion. He also arranged for arrested demonstrators to be taken to jails in surrounding communities, allowing plenty of room to remain in his jail. Pritchett also foresaw King's presence as a danger and forced his release to prevent King from rallying the black community. King left in 1962 without having achieved any dramatic victories. The local movement, however, continued the struggle and made significant gains over the next few years.

=== Birmingham campaign, 1963 ===
The Albany Movement served as an important lesson for the SCLC, which undertook the Birmingham Campaign in 1963. Executive Director Wyatt Tee Walker carefully planned the campaign's early strategy and tactics. It focused on one goal—the desegregation of Birmingham's downtown merchants, rather than total desegregation, as in Albany.

The movement's efforts were aided by the brutal response of local authorities, particularly Eugene "Bull" Connor, the Commissioner of Public Safety. He had long held much political power but had lost a recent election for mayor to a less rabidly segregationist candidate. Refusing to accept the new mayor's authority, Connor intended to stay in office.

The campaign used a variety of nonviolent methods of confrontation, including sit-ins, kneel-ins at local churches, and a march to the county building to mark the beginning of a voter-registration drive. The city, however, obtained an injunction barring all such protests. Convinced that the order was unconstitutional, the campaign defied it and prepared for mass arrests of its supporters. King elected to be among those arrested on April 12, 1963.

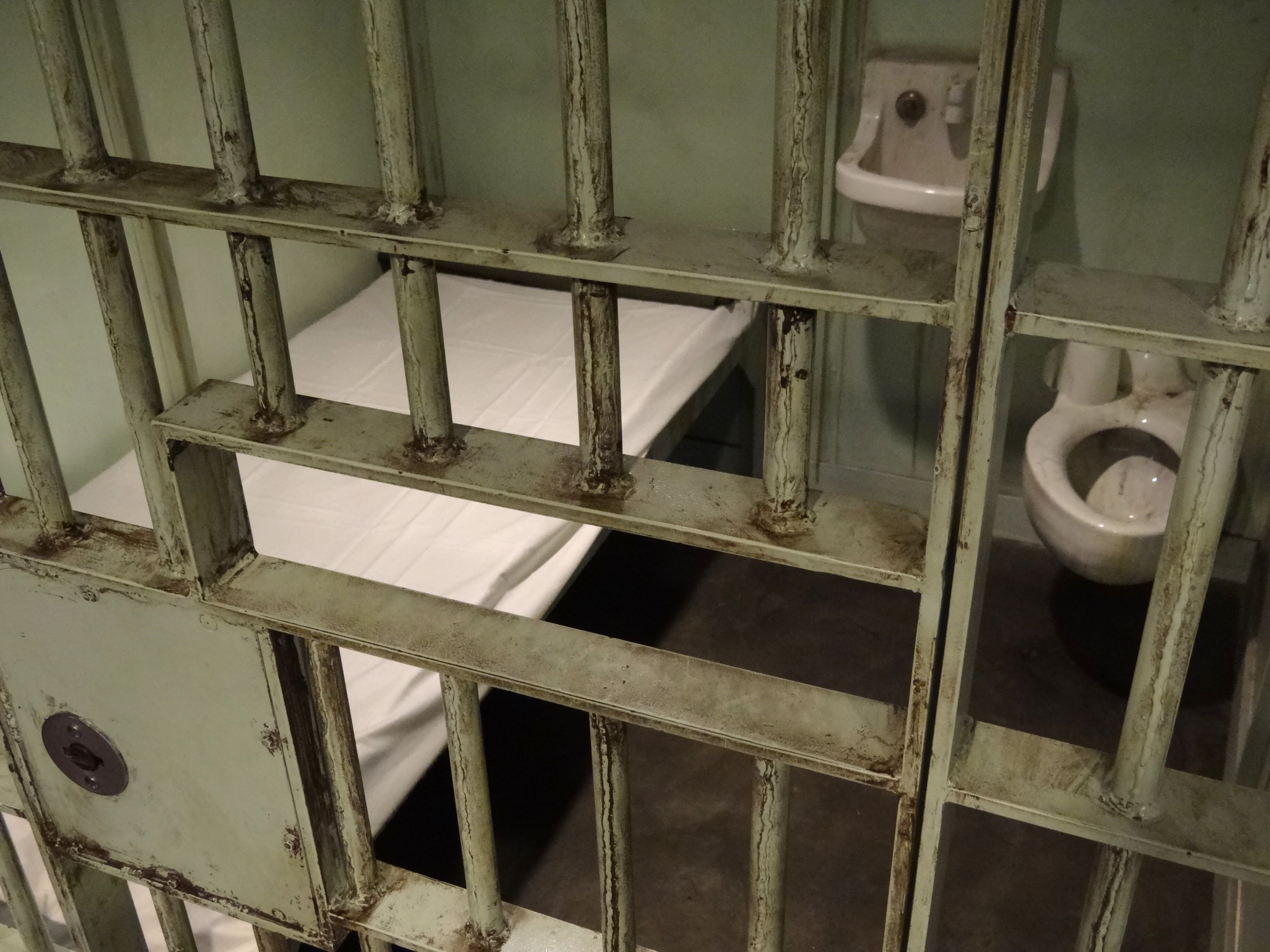
Recreation of Martin Luther King Jr.'s cell in Birmingham Jail at the National Civil Rights Museum

While in jail, King wrote his famous "Letter from Birmingham Jail" on the margins of a newspaper, since he had not been allowed any writing paper while held in solitary confinement. Supporters appealed to the Kennedy administration, which intervened to obtain King's release. Walter Reuther, president of the United Auto Workers, arranged for $160,000 to bail out King and his fellow protestors. King was allowed to call his wife, who was recuperating at home after the birth of their fourth child, and was released early on April 19.

The campaign, however, faltered as it ran out of demonstrators willing to risk arrest. James Bevel, SCLC's Director of Direct Action and Director of Nonviolent Education, then came up with a bold and controversial alternative: to train high school students to take part in the demonstrations. As a result, in what would be called the Children's Crusade, more than 1,000 students skipped school on May 2 to meet at the 16th Street Baptist Church and join the demonstrations. More than six hundred marched out of the church, fifty at a time, in an attempt to walk to City Hall to speak to Birmingham's mayor about segregation. They were arrested and jailed. In this first encounter, the police acted with restraint. The next day, however, another one thousand students gathered at the church. When Bevel started them marching fifty at a time, Bull Connor finally unleashed police dogs on them and then turned the city's fire hoses on the children. National television networks broadcast the scenes of the dogs attacking demonstrators and the water from the fire hoses knocking down the schoolchildren.

Widespread public outrage led the Kennedy administration to intervene more forcefully in negotiations between the white business community and the SCLC. On May 10, the parties announced an agreement to desegregate the lunch counters and other public accommodations downtown, to create a committee to eliminate discriminatory hiring practices, to arrange for the release of jailed protesters, and to establish regular means of communication between black and white leaders.

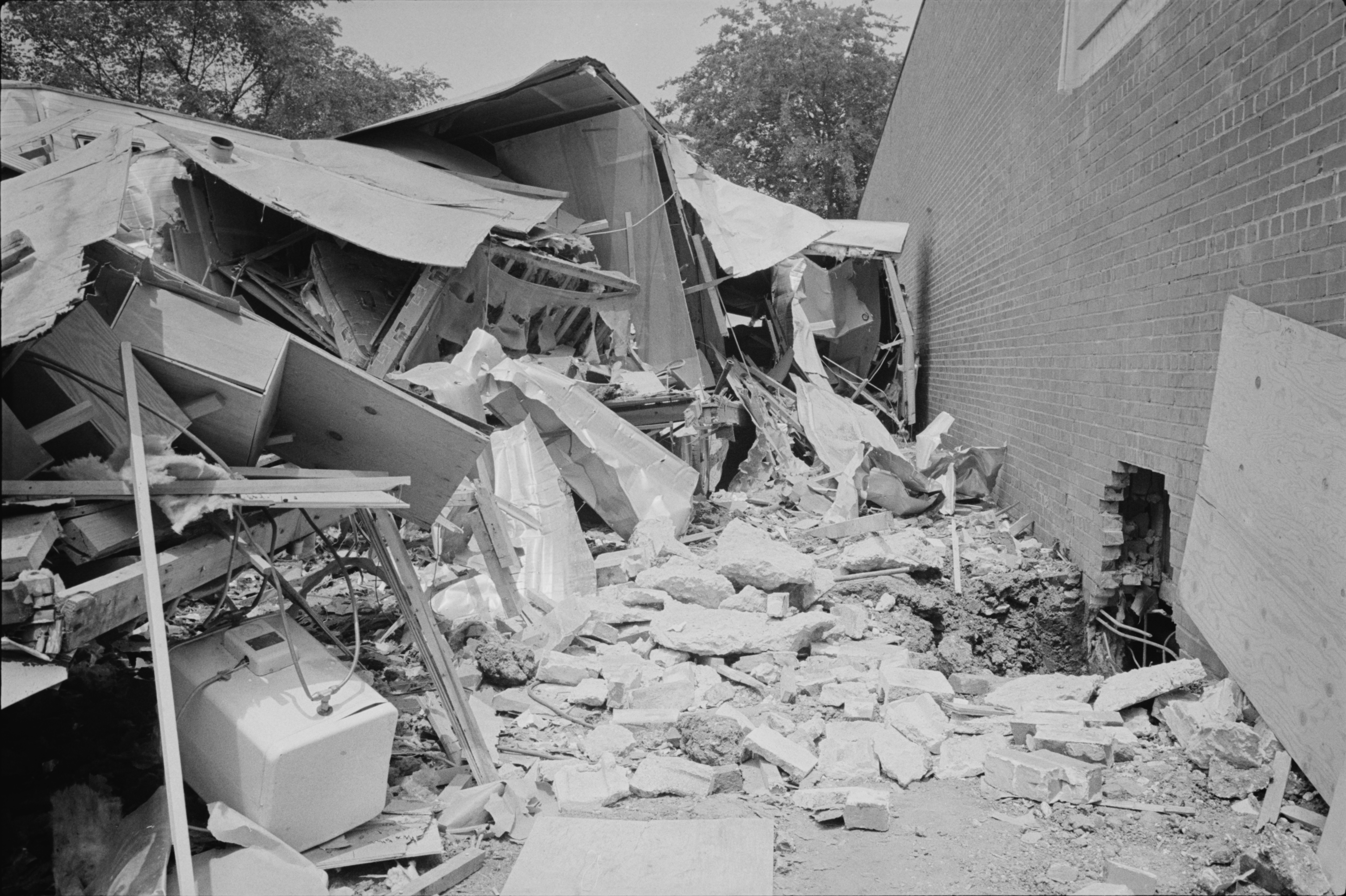
Wreckage at the Gaston Motel following the bomb explosion on May 11, 1963

Not everyone in the black community approved of the agreement—Fred Shuttlesworth was particularly critical, since he was skeptical about the good faith of Birmingham's power structure from his experience in dealing with them. Parts of the white community reacted violently. They bombed the Gaston Motel, which housed the SCLC's unofficial headquarters, and the home of King's brother, the Reverend A. D. King. In response, thousands of Black people rioted, burning numerous buildings, and one of them stabbed and wounded a police officer.

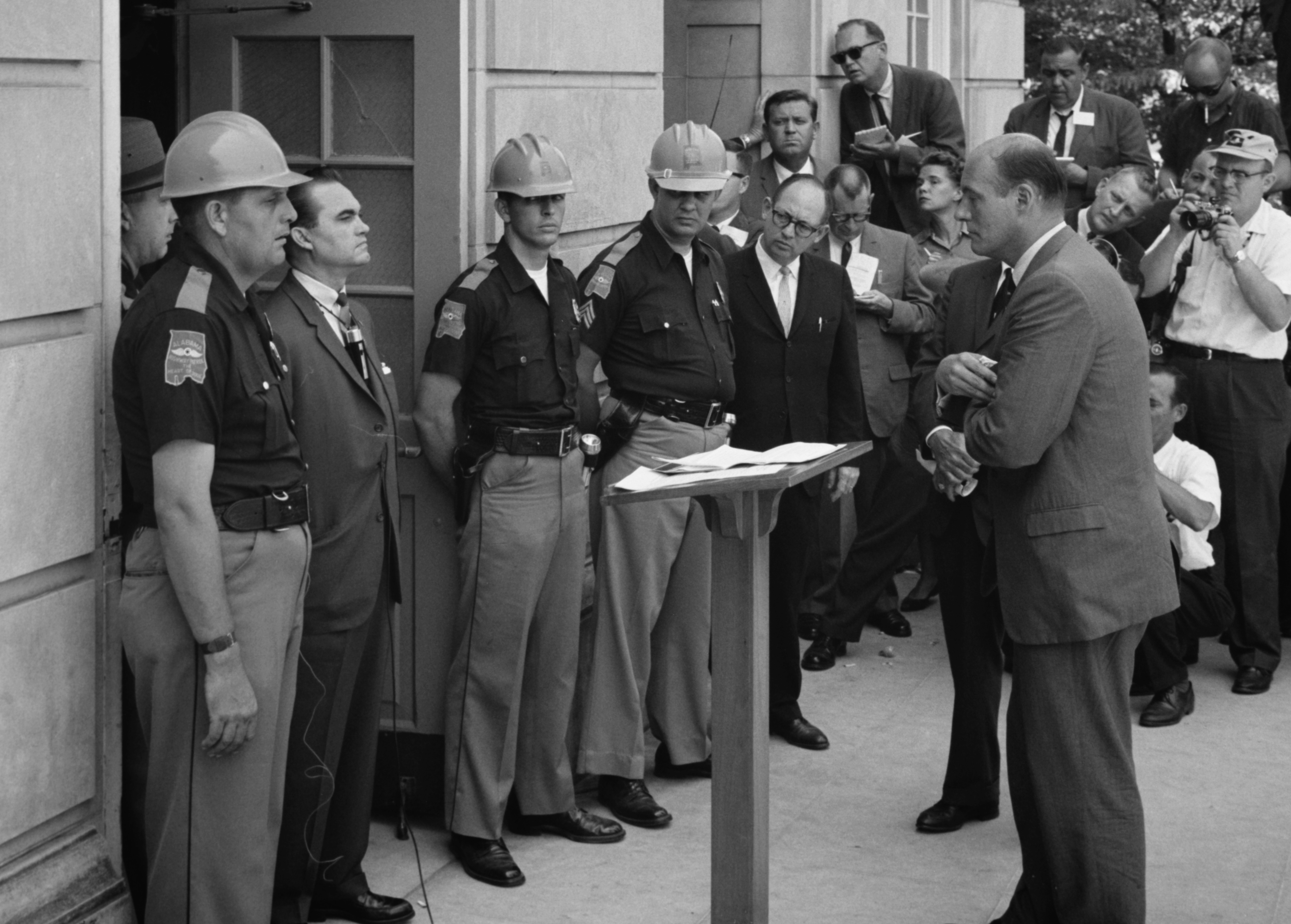
Alabama governor George Wallace tried to block desegregation at the University of Alabama and is confronted by U.S. Deputy Attorney General Nicholas Katzenbach in 1963.

Kennedy was prepared to federalize the Alabama National Guard if the need arose. Four months later, on September 15, a conspiracy of Ku Klux Klan members bombed the Sixteenth Street Baptist Church in Birmingham, killing four young girls.

=== "Rising tide of discontent" and Kennedy's response, 1963 ===
Birmingham was only one of over a hundred cities rocked by the chaotic protests that spring and summer, some in the North but mainly in the South. During the March on Washington, Martin Luther King Jr. would refer to such protests as "the whirlwinds of revolt." In Chicago, Black people rioted through the South Side in late May after a white police officer shot a fourteen-year-old black boy who was fleeing the scene of a robbery. Violent clashes between black activists and white workers took place in both Philadelphia and Harlem in successful efforts to integrate state construction projects. On June 6, over a thousand whites attacked a sit-in in Lexington, North Carolina; Black people fought back and one white man was killed. Edwin C. Berry of the National Urban League warned of a complete breakdown in race relations: "My message from the beer gardens and the barbershops all indicate the fact that the Negro is ready for war."

In Cambridge, Maryland, a working‐class city on the Eastern Shore, Gloria Richardson of SNCC led a movement that pressed for desegregation but also demanded low‐rent public housing, job‐training, public and private jobs, and an end to police brutality. On June 11, struggles between Black people and whites escalated into violent rioting, leading Maryland Governor J. Millard Tawes to declare martial law. When negotiations between Richardson and Maryland officials faltered, Attorney General Robert F. Kennedy directly intervened to negotiate a desegregation agreement. Richardson felt that the increasing participation of poor and working-class Black people was expanding both the power and parameters of the movement, asserting that "the people as a whole really do have more intelligence than a few of their leaders.ʺ

In their deliberations during this wave of protests, the Kennedy administration privately felt that militant demonstrations were ʺbad for the countryʺ and that "Negroes are going to push this thing too far." On May 24, Robert Kennedy had a meeting with prominent black intellectuals to discuss the racial situation. The black delegation criticized Kennedy harshly for vacillating on civil rights and said that the African-American community's thoughts were increasingly turning to violence. The meeting ended with ill will on all sides. Nonetheless, the Kennedys ultimately decided that new legislation for equal public accommodations was essential to drive activists "into the courts and out of the streets."

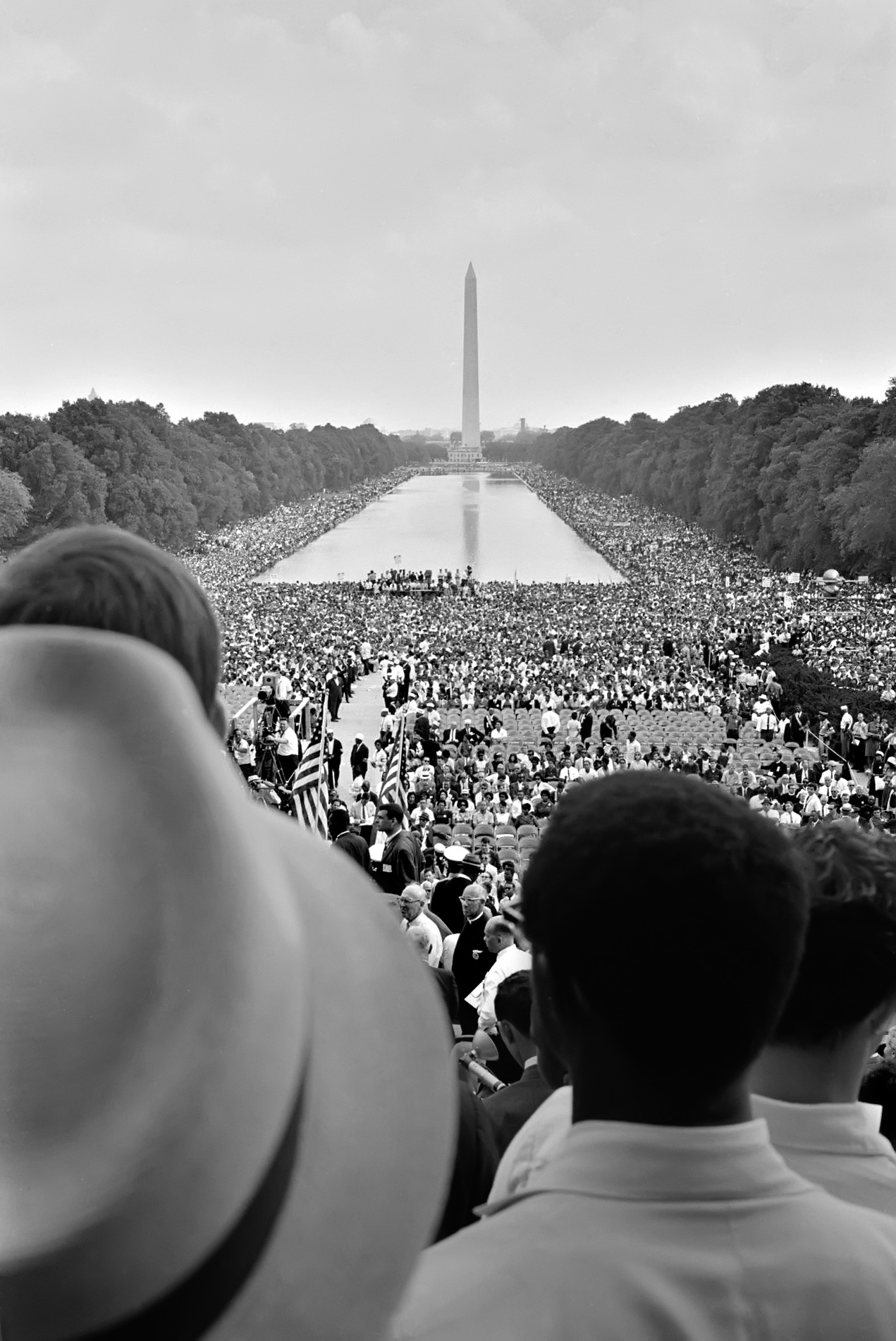
The March on Washington for Jobs and Freedom at the National Mall

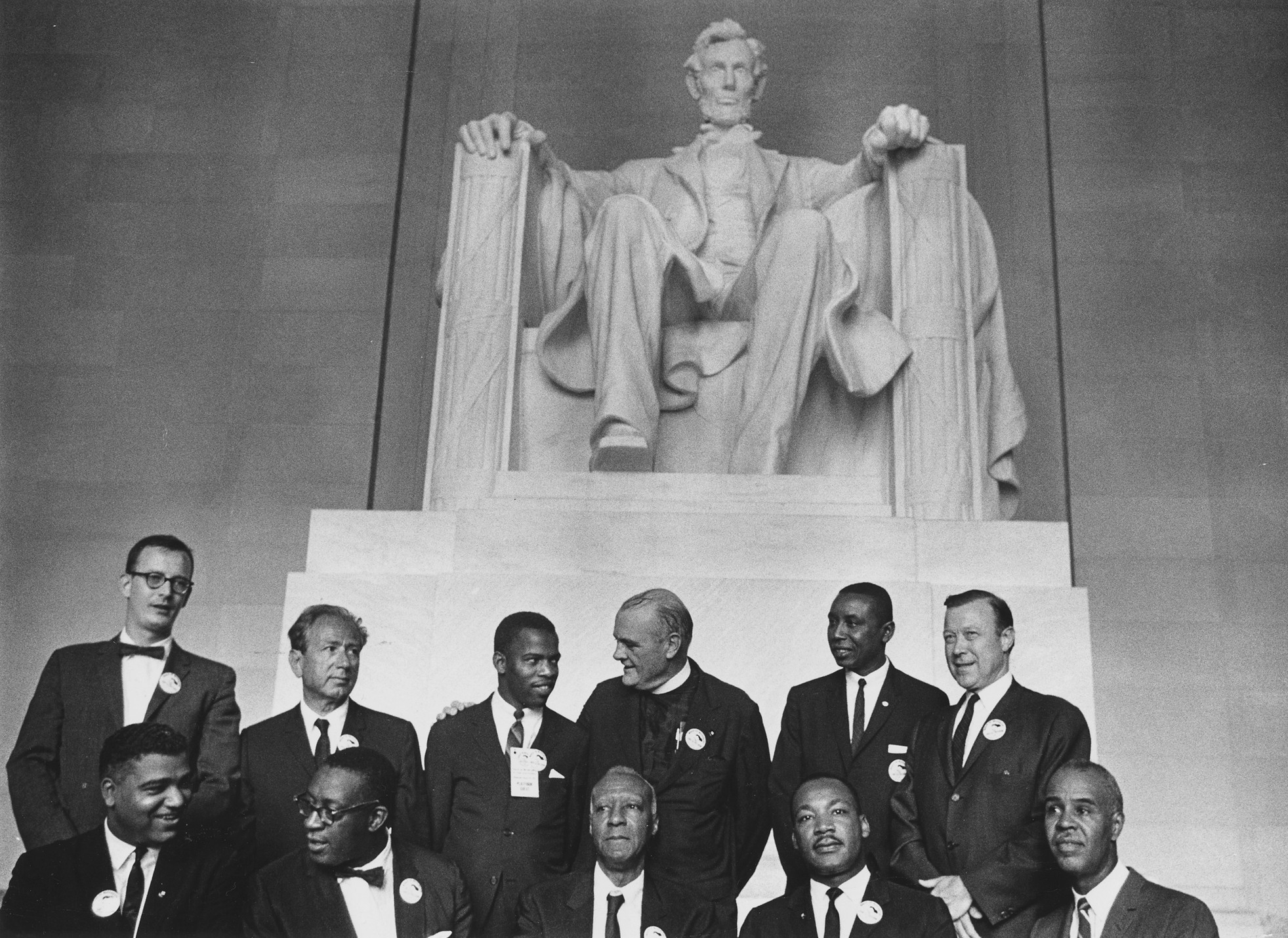
Leaders of the March on Washington posing before the Lincoln Memorial on August 28, 1963

On June 11, 1963, George Wallace, Governor of Alabama, tried to block the integration of the University of Alabama. President John F. Kennedy sent a military force to make Governor Wallace step aside, allowing the enrollment of Vivian Malone Jones and James Hood. That evening, President Kennedy addressed the nation on TV and radio with his historic civil rights speech, where he lamented "a rising tide of discontent that threatens the public safety." He called on Congress to pass new civil rights legislation, and urged the country to embrace civil rights as "a moral issue...in our daily lives." In the early hours of June 12, Medgar Evers, field secretary of the Mississippi NAACP, was assassinated by a member of the Klan. The next week, as promised, on June 19, 1963, President Kennedy submitted his Civil Rights bill to Congress.

=== March on Washington, 1963 ===
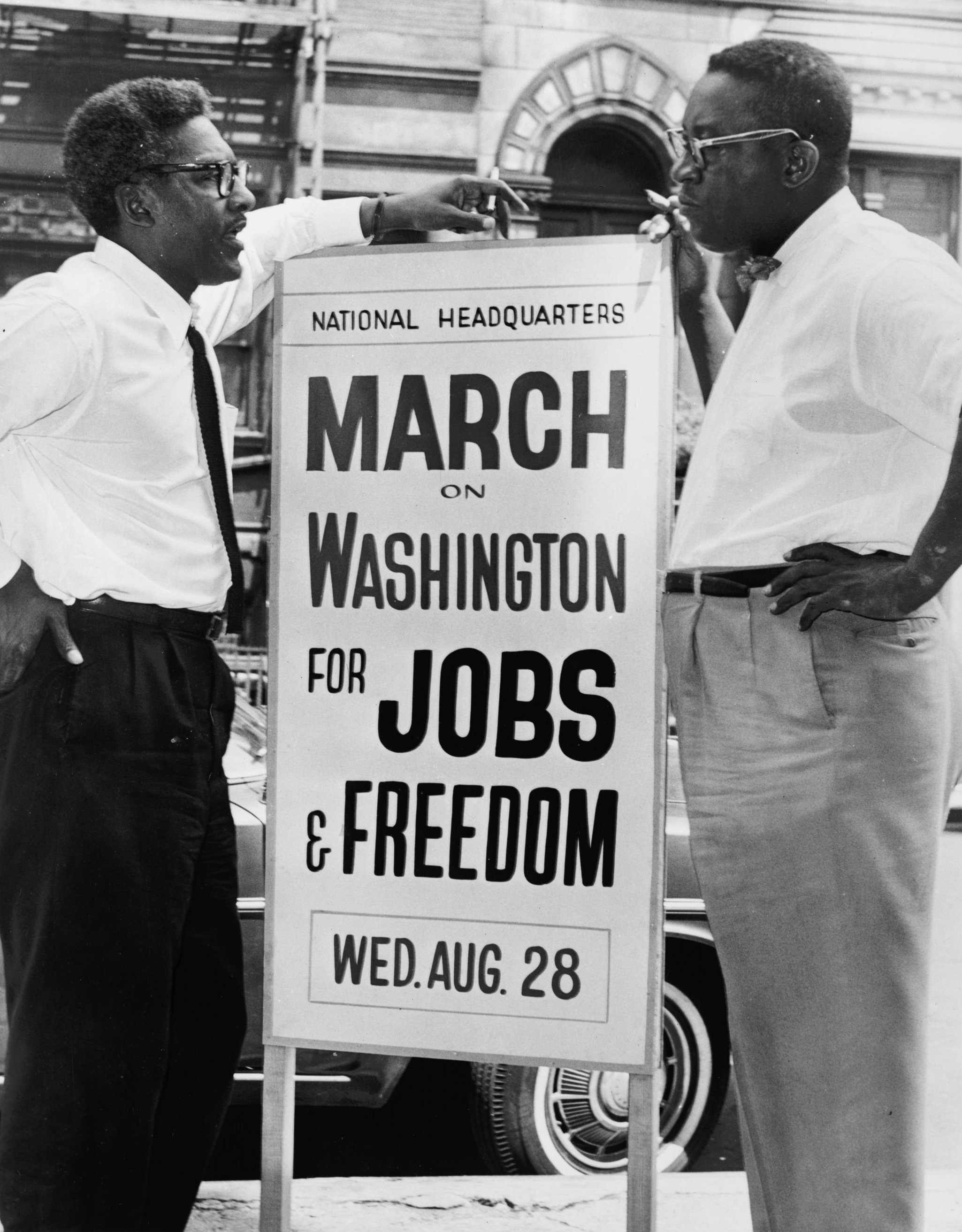
Bayard Rustin (left) and Cleveland Robinson (right), organizers of the March, on August 7, 1963

Randolph and Bayard Rustin were the chief planners of the March on Washington for Jobs and Freedom, which they proposed in 1962. In 1963, the Kennedy administration initially opposed the march, concerned that it would undermine the drive to pass civil rights legislation. However, Randolph and King were firm in their belief that the march would proceed. With the march going forward, the Kennedys decided it was important to work to ensure its success. Concerned about the turnout, President Kennedy enlisted the aid of white church leaders and Walter Reuther, president of the UAW, to help mobilize white supporters for the march.

The march was held on August 28, 1963. Unlike the planned 1941 march, in which Randolph included only black-led organizations, the 1963 march was a collaborative effort involving all the major civil rights organizations, the more progressive wing of the labor movement, and other liberal organizations. The march had six official goals:

- meaningful civil rights laws
- a massive federal works program
- full and fair employment
- decent housing
- the right to vote
- adequate integrated education.

Of these, the march's primary focus was the passage of the Civil Rights Act that the Kennedy administration had proposed following the upheavals in Birmingham.

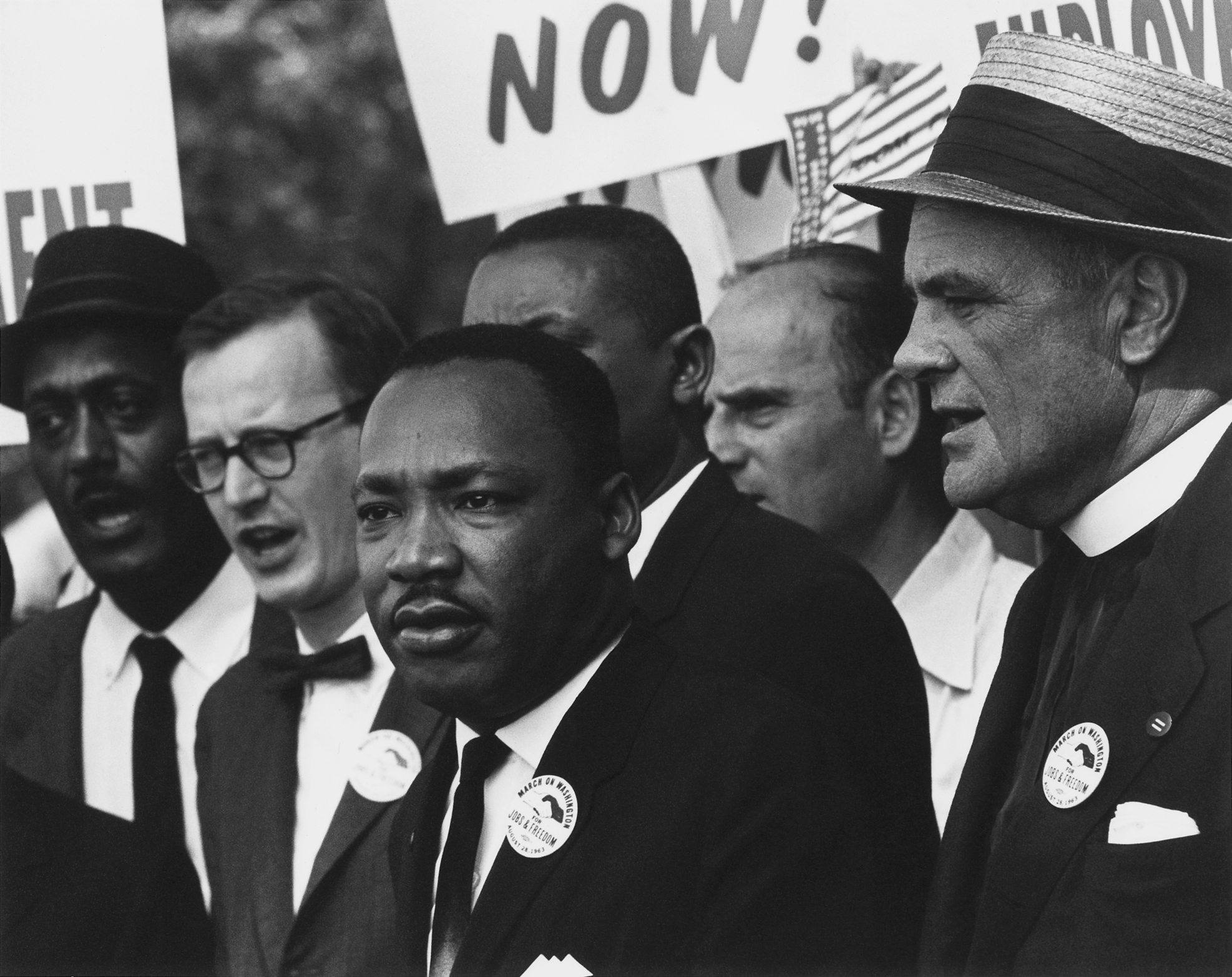
Martin Luther King Jr. at a civil rights march on Washington, D.C.

National media attention also greatly contributed to the march's national exposure and probable impact. In the essay "The March on Washington and Television News", historian William Thomas notes: "Over five hundred cameramen, technicians, and correspondents from the major networks were set to cover the event. More cameras would be set up than had filmed the last presidential inauguration. One camera was positioned high in the Washington Monument, to give dramatic vistas of the marchers". By carrying the organizers' speeches and offering their own commentary, television stations framed the way their local audiences saw and understood the event.

"I Have a Dream"
30-second sample from "I Have a Dream" speech by Martin Luther King Jr. at the March on Washington for Jobs and Freedom on August 28, 1963

The march was a success, although not without controversy. An estimated 200,000 to 300,000 demonstrators gathered in front of the Lincoln Memorial, where King delivered his famous "I Have a Dream" speech. While many speakers applauded the Kennedy administration for the efforts it had made toward obtaining new, more effective civil rights legislation protecting the right to vote and outlawing segregation, John Lewis of SNCC took the administration to task for not doing more to protect southern Black people and civil rights workers under attack in the Deep South.

After the march, King and other civil rights leaders met with President Kennedy at the White House. While the Kennedy administration appeared sincerely committed to passing the bill, it was not clear that it had enough votes in Congress to do so. However, when President Kennedy was assassinated on November 22, 1963, the new President Lyndon Johnson decided to use his influence in Congress to bring about much of Kennedy's legislative agenda.

=== St. Augustine, Florida, 1963–1964 ===
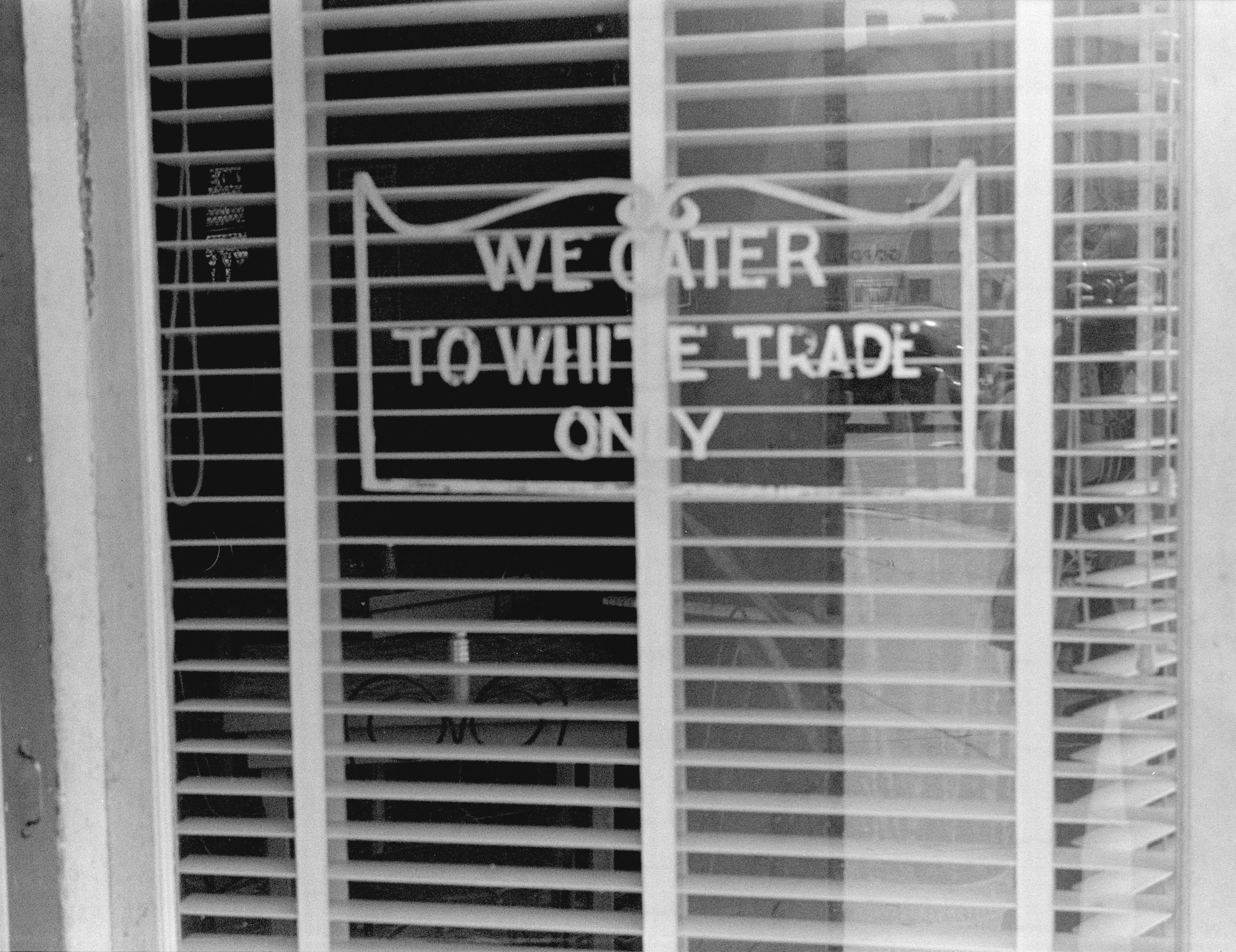
"We Cater to White Trade Only" sign on a restaurant window in Lancaster, Ohio, in 1938. In 1964, Martin Luther King Jr. was arrested and spent a night in jail for attempting to eat at a white-only restaurant in St. Augustine, Florida.

In St. Augustine, Florida, a local movement had been picketing segregated local institutions since 1963. In the fall of 1964, four teenagers who came to be known as "The St. Augustine Four" sat in at a local Woolworth's lunch counter, seeking to get served. They were arrested and convicted of trespassing and sentenced to six months in jail and reform school. It took a special act of the governor and cabinet of Florida to release them after national protests by the Pittsburgh Courier, Jackie Robinson, and others.

In response to repression, the St. Augustine movement practiced armed self-defense alongside nonviolent direct action. In June 1963, Hayling publicly stated that "I and the others have armed. We will shoot first and answer questions later. We are not going to die like Medgar Evers." The comment made national headlines. When Klan nightriders terrorized black neighborhoods in St. Augustine, Hayling's NAACP members often drove them off with gunfire. In October 1963, a Klansman was killed.

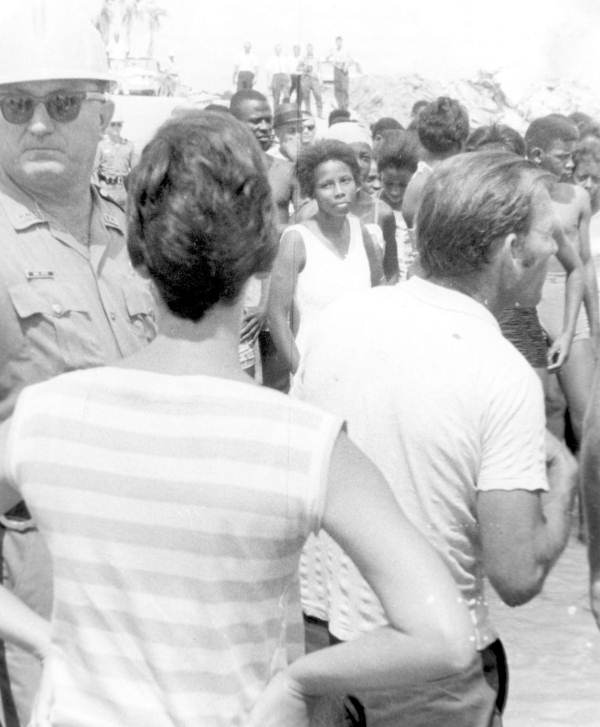
White segregationists (foreground) trying to prevent black people from swimming at a "White only" beach in St. Augustine, Florida during the 1964 Monson Motor Lodge protests

In 1964, Hayling and other activists urged the Southern Christian Leadership Conference to come to St. Augustine. Four prominent Massachusetts women—Mary Parkman Peabody, Esther Burgess, Hester Campbell (all of whose husbands were Episcopal bishops), and Florence Rowe (whose husband was vice president of an insurance company)—also came to lend their support. The arrest of Peabody, the 72-year-old mother of the governor of Massachusetts, for attempting to eat at the segregated Ponce de Leon Motor Lodge in an integrated group, made front-page news across the country and brought the movement in St. Augustine to the attention of the world.

Widely publicized activities continued in the ensuing months. When King was arrested, he sent a "Letter from the St. Augustine Jail" to a northern supporter, Rabbi Israel S. Dresner. A week later, the largest mass arrest of rabbis in American history took place, while they were conducting a prayer-in at the segregated Monson Motel. A well-known photograph taken in St. Augustine shows the manager of the Monson Motel pouring hydrochloric acid in the swimming pool while Black people and whites are swimming in it. As he did so, he yelled that he was "cleaning the pool", a presumed reference to it now being, in his eyes, racially contaminated. The photograph was run on the front page of a Washington newspaper the day the Senate was to vote on passing the Civil Rights Act of 1964.

=== Chester school protests, Spring 1964 ===
From November 1963 through April 1964, the Chester school protests were a series of civil rights protests led by George Raymond of the National Association for the Advancement of Colored Persons (NAACP) and Stanley Branche of the Committee for Freedom Now (CFFN) that made Chester, Pennsylvania one of the key northern sites of the civil rights movement. James Farmer, the national director of the Congress of Racial Equality called Chester "the Birmingham of the North".

In 1962, Branche and the CFFN focused on improving conditions at the predominantly black Franklin Elementary school in Chester. Although the school was built to house 500 students, it had become overcrowded with 1,200 students. The school's average class size was 39, twice the number of nearby all-white schools. The school was built in 1910 and had never been updated. Only two bathrooms were available for the entire school. In November 1963, CFFN protesters blocked the entrance to Franklin Elementary school and the Chester Municipal Building, resulting in the arrest of 240 protesters. Following public attention to the protests stoked by media coverage of the mass arrests, the mayor and school board negotiated with the CFFN and NAACP. The Chester Board of Education agreed to reduce class sizes at Franklin school, remove unsanitary toilet facilities, relocate classes held in the boiler room and coal bin, and repair school grounds.

Emboldened by the success of the Franklin Elementary School demonstrations, the CFFN recruited new members, sponsored voter-registration drives, and planned a citywide boycott of Chester schools. Branche built close ties with students at nearby Swarthmore College, Pennsylvania Military College, and Cheyney State College to ensure large turnouts at demonstrations and protests. Branche invited Dick Gregory and Malcolm X to Chester to participate in the "Freedom Now Conference", and other national civil rights leaders such as Gloria Richardson came to Chester in support of the demonstrations.

In 1964, a series of almost nightly protests brought chaos to Chester as protestors argued that the Chester School Board had de facto segregation of schools. The mayor of Chester, James Gorbey, issued "The Police Position to Preserve the Public Peace", a ten-point statement promising an immediate return to law and order. The city deputized firefighters and trash collectors to help handle demonstrators. The State of Pennsylvania deployed 50 state troopers to assist the 77-member Chester police force. The demonstrations were marked by violence and charges of police brutality. Over six hundred people were arrested over a two-month period of civil rights rallies, marches, pickets, boycotts and sit-ins. Pennsylvania Governor William Scranton became involved in the negotiations and convinced Branche to obey a court-ordered moratorium on demonstrations. Scranton created the Pennsylvania Human Relations Commission to conduct hearings on the de facto segregation of public schools. All protests were discontinued while the commission held hearings during the summer of 1964.

In November 1964, the Pennsylvania Human Relations Commission concluded that the Chester School Board had violated the law and ordered the Chester School District to desegregate the city's six predominantly African-American schools. The city appealed the ruling, which delayed implementation.

=== Freedom Summer, 1964 ===
In the summer of 1964, COFO brought nearly 1,000 activists to Mississippi—most of them white college students from the North and West—to join with local black activists to register voters, teach in "Freedom Schools", and organize the Mississippi Freedom Democratic Party (MFDP).

Many of Mississippi's white residents deeply resented the outsiders and attempts to change their society. State and local governments, police, the White Citizens' Council, and the Ku Klux Klan used arrests, beatings, arson, murder, spying, firing, evictions, and other forms of intimidation and harassment to oppose the project and prevent Black people from registering to vote or achieving social equality.

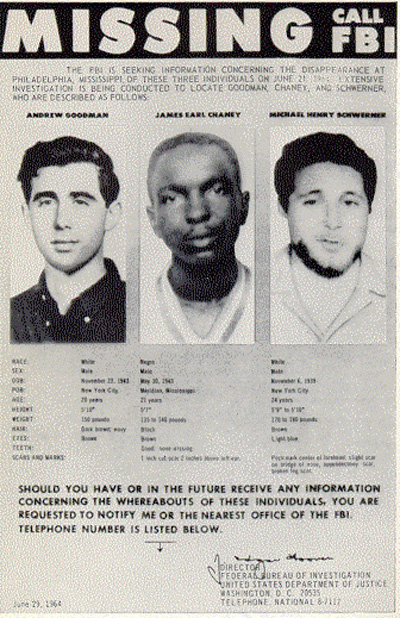
Missing persons poster created by the FBI in 1964 shows the photographs of Andrew Goodman, James Chaney, and Michael Schwerner

On June 21, 1964, three civil rights workers disappeared: James Chaney, a young black Mississippian and plasterer's apprentice; and two Jewish activists, Andrew Goodman, a Queens College anthropology student; and Michael Schwerner, a CORE organizer from Manhattan's Lower East Side. They were found weeks later, murdered by conspirators who turned out to be local members of the Klan, some of the members of the Neshoba County sheriff's department. This outraged the public, leading the U.S. Justice Department, along with the FBI (the latter of which had previously avoided dealing with the issue of segregation and persecution of Black people), to take action. The outrage over these murders helped lead to the passage of the Civil Rights Act of 1964 and the Voting Rights Act of 1965.

From June to August, Freedom Summer activists worked in 38 local projects scattered across the state, with the largest number concentrated in the Mississippi Delta region. At least 30 Freedom Schools, with close to 3,500 students, were established, and 28 community centers were set up.

Over the course of the Summer Project, some 17,000 Mississippi Black people attempted to become registered voters in defiance of the red tape and forces of white supremacy arrayed against them—only 1,600 (less than 10%) succeeded. But more than 80,000 joined the Mississippi Freedom Democratic Party (MFDP), founded as an alternative political organization, showing their desire to vote and participate in politics.

Though Freedom Summer failed to register many voters, it had a significant effect on the course of the civil rights movement. It helped break down the decades of people's isolation and repression that were the foundation of the Jim Crow system. Before Freedom Summer, the national news media had paid little attention to the persecution of black voters in the Deep South and the dangers endured by black civil rights workers. The progression of events throughout the South increased media attention to Mississippi.

The deaths of affluent northern white students and threats to non-Southerners attracted the full attention of the media spotlight to the state. Many black activists became embittered, believing the media valued the lives of whites and Black people differently. Perhaps the most significant effect of Freedom Summer was on the volunteers, almost all of whom—black and white—still consider it to have been one of the defining periods of their lives.

=== Civil Rights Act of 1964 ===
Although President Kennedy had proposed civil rights legislation and it had support from Northern Congressmen and Senators of both parties, Southern Senators blocked the bill by threatening filibusters. After considerable parliamentary maneuvering and 54 days of filibuster on the floor of the United States Senate, President Johnson got a bill through Congress.

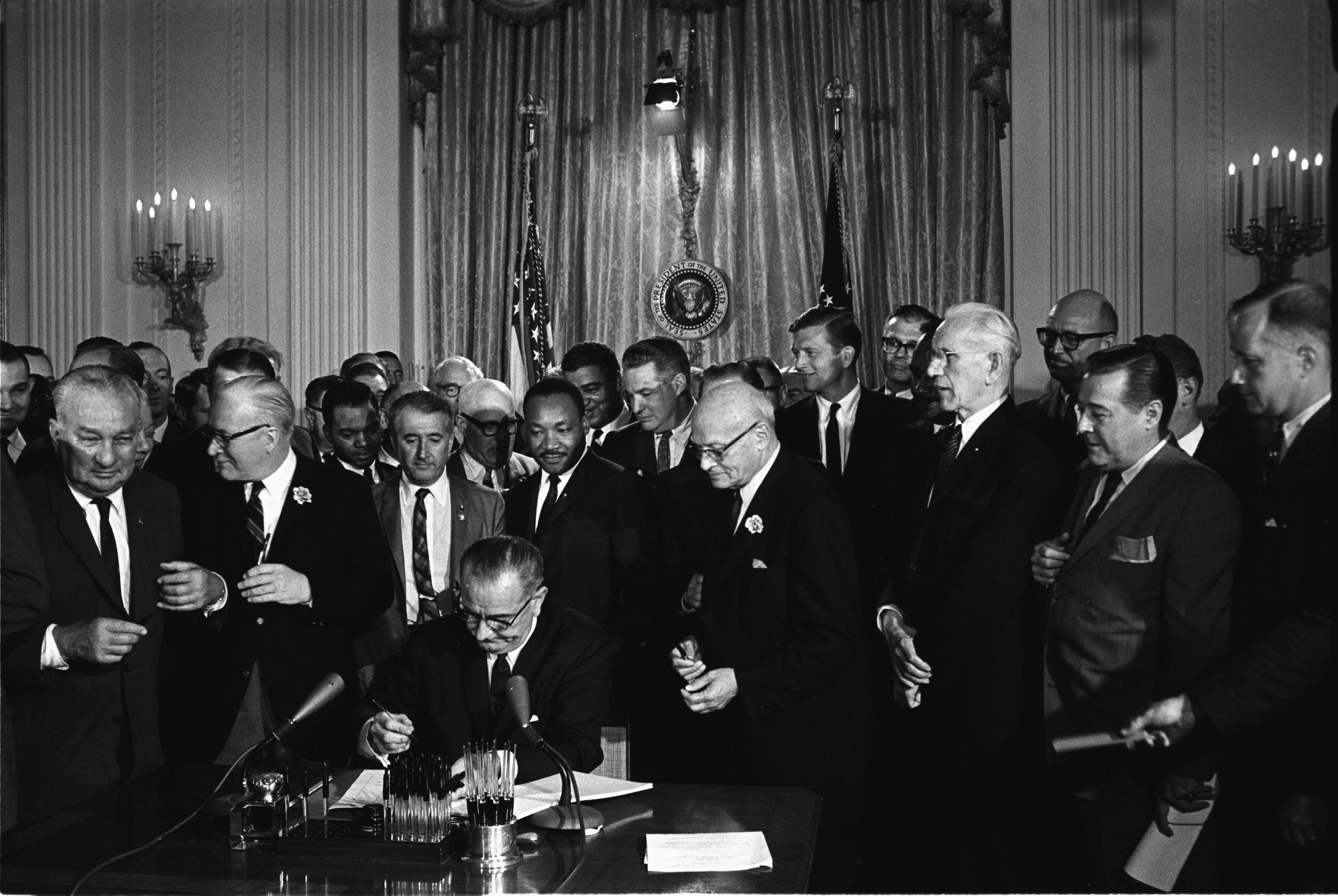
Lyndon B. Johnson signs the historic Civil Rights Act of 1964

On July 2, 1964, Johnson signed the Civil Rights Act of 1964, which banned discrimination based on "race, color, religion, sex or national origin" in employment practices and public accommodations. The bill authorized the Attorney General to file lawsuits to enforce the new law. The law also nullified state and local laws that required such discrimination.

=== Mississippi Freedom Democratic Party, 1964 ===
Black people in Mississippi had been disfranchised by statutory and constitutional changes since the late 19th century. In 1963, COFO held a Freedom Ballot in Mississippi to demonstrate black Mississippians' desire to vote. More than 80,000 people registered and voted in the mock election, which pitted an integrated slate of candidates from the "Freedom Party" against the official state Democratic Party candidates.

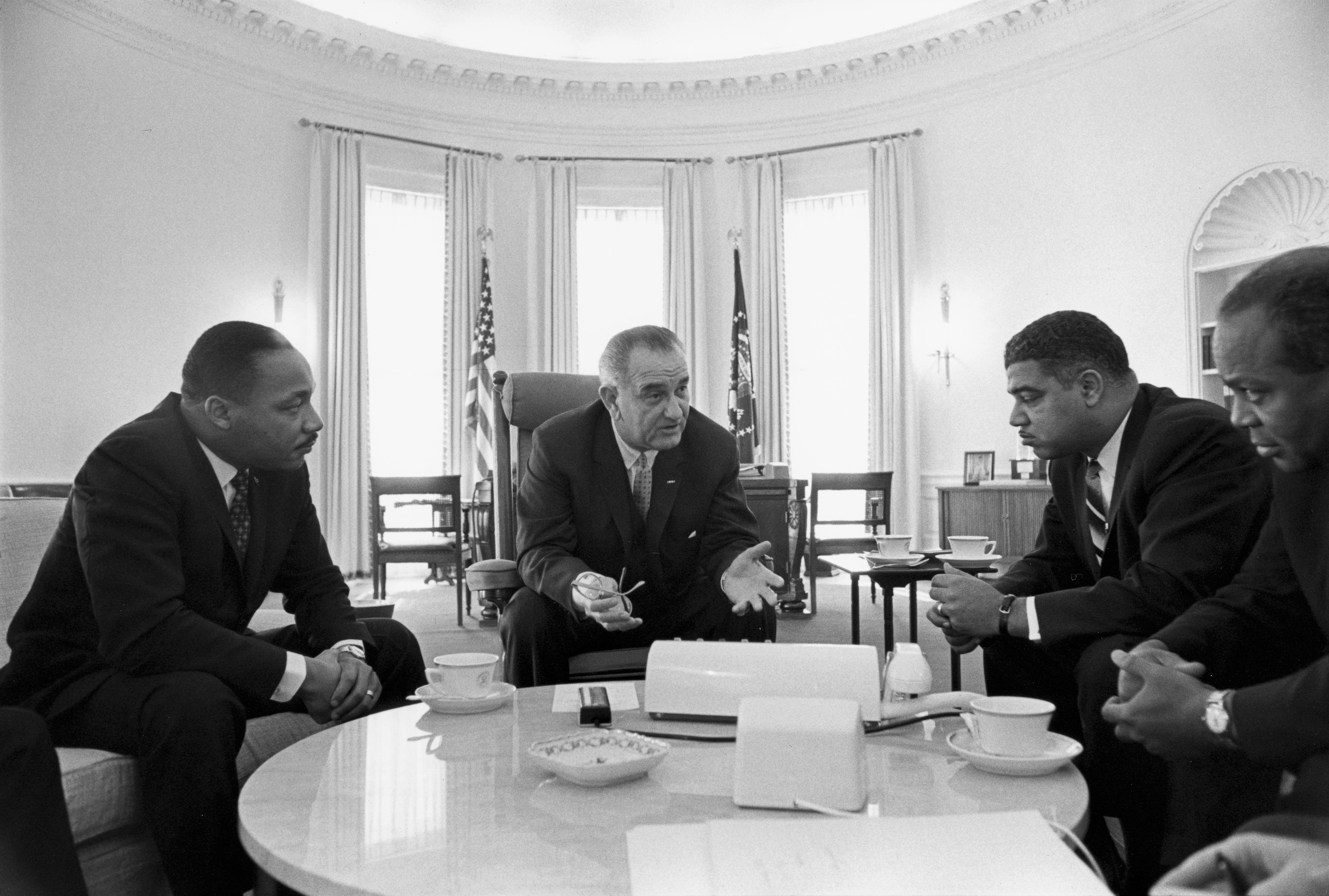
President Lyndon B. Johnson (center) meets with civil rights leaders Martin Luther King Jr., Whitney Young, and James Farmer, January 1964

In 1964, organizers launched the Mississippi Freedom Democratic Party (MFDP) to challenge the all-white official party. When Mississippi voting registrars refused to recognize their candidates, they held their own primary. They selected Fannie Lou Hamer, Annie Devine, and Victoria Gray to run for Congress, and a slate of delegates to represent Mississippi at the 1964 Democratic National Convention.

The presence of the Mississippi Freedom Democratic Party in Atlantic City, New Jersey, was inconvenient, however, for the convention organizers. They had planned a triumphant celebration of the Johnson administration's civil rights achievements, rather than a fight over racism within the Democratic Party. All-white delegations from other Southern states threatened to walk out if the official slate from Mississippi was not seated. Johnson was worried about the inroads that Republican Barry Goldwater's campaign was making in what previously had been the white Democratic stronghold of the "Solid South", as well as the support that George Wallace had received in the North during the Democratic primaries.

Johnson could not, however, prevent the MFDP from taking its case to the Credentials Committee. There, Fannie Lou Hamer testified eloquently about the beatings that she and others endured and the threats they faced for trying to register to vote. Turning to the television cameras, Hamer asked, "Is this America?"

Johnson offered the MFDP a "compromise" under which it would receive two non-voting, at-large seats, while the white delegation sent by the official Democratic Party would retain its seats. The MFDP angrily rejected the "compromise."

The MFDP kept up its agitation at the convention after it was denied official recognition. When all but three of the "regular" Mississippi delegates left because they refused to pledge allegiance to the party, the MFDP delegates borrowed passes from sympathetic delegates and took the seats vacated by the official Mississippi delegates. National party organizers removed them. When they returned the next day, they found convention organizers had removed the empty seats that had been there the day before. They stayed and sang "freedom songs".

The 1964 Democratic Party convention disillusioned many within the MFDP and the civil rights movement, but it did not destroy the MFDP. The MFDP became more radical after Atlantic City. It invited Malcolm X to speak at one of its conventions and opposed the Vietnam War.

=== Selma Voting Rights Movement ===
SNCC had undertaken an ambitious voter registration program in Selma, Alabama, in 1963, but by 1965, little headway had been made in the face of opposition from Selma's sheriff, Jim Clark. After residents asked the SCLC for assistance, King came to Selma to lead several marches, at which he was arrested along with 250 other demonstrators. The marchers continued to meet violent resistance from the police. Jimmie Lee Jackson, a resident of nearby Marion, was killed by police at a later march on February 17, 1965. Jackson's death prompted James Bevel, director of the Selma Movement, to initiate and organize a plan to march from Selma to Montgomery, the state capital.

On March 7, 1965, acting on Bevel's plan, Hosea Williams of the SCLC and John Lewis of SNCC led a march of 600 people to walk the 54 miles (87 km) from Selma to the state capital in Montgomery. Six blocks into the march, at the Edmund Pettus Bridge where the marchers left the city and moved into the county, state troopers, and local county law enforcement, some mounted on horseback, attacked the peaceful demonstrators with billy clubs, tear gas, rubber tubes wrapped in barbed wire, and bullwhips. They drove the marchers back into Selma. Lewis was knocked unconscious and dragged to safety. At least 16 other marchers were hospitalized. Among those gassed and beaten was Amelia Boynton, who was at the center of civil rights activity at the time.

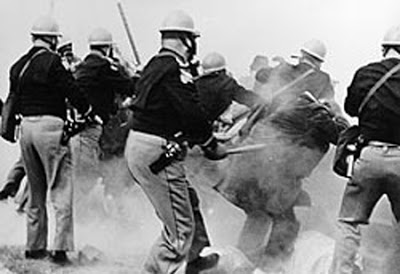
Police attack nonviolent marchers on "Bloody Sunday", the first day of the Selma to Montgomery marches.

The national broadcast of the news footage of law enforcement officers attacking unresisting marchers seeking to exercise their constitutional right to vote provoked a national response, and hundreds of people from all over the country came for a second march. King turned around these marchers at the last minute to avoid violating a federal injunction. This displeased many demonstrators, especially those who resented King's nonviolence (such as James Forman and Robert F. Williams).

That night, local Whites attacked James Reeb, a voting rights supporter. He died of his injuries in a Birmingham hospital on March 11. Due to the national outcry at a White minister being murdered so brazenly (as well as the subsequent civil disobedience led by Gorman and other SNCC leaders all over the country, especially in Montgomery and at the White House), the marchers were able to lift the injunction and obtain protection from federal troops, permitting them to make the march across Alabama without incident two weeks later; during the march, Gorman, Williams, and other more militant protesters carried bricks and sticks of their own.

Four Klansmen shot and killed Detroit homemaker Viola Liuzzo as she drove marchers back to Selma that night.

=== Voting Rights Act of 1965 ===
'Remarks on the Signing of the Voting Rights Act'
Statement before the United States Congress by Johnson on August 6, 1965, about the Voting Rights Act

"Remarks on the Signing of the Voting Rights Act"
audio only

Eight days after the first march, but before the final march, President Johnson delivered a televised address to support the voting rights bill he had sent to Congress. In it, he stated:

Their cause must be our cause too. Because it is not just Negroes, but really it is all of us, who must overcome the crippling legacy of bigotry and injustice. And we shall overcome.

On May 26, the Senate passed S. 1564, the Voting Rights Act, by a vote of 77–19, with only Southern Senators opposing the bill. On July 9, the House of Representatives passed H.R. 6400, the House version of the bill, by a vote of 333–85. On August 3–4, the two houses of Congress reconciled the two bill, and on August 6, President Johnson signed the Voting Rights Act of 1965. The bill suspended literacy tests and other subjective voter registration tests. It authorized Federal supervision of voter registration in states and individual voting districts where such tests were used and where African Americans were historically underrepresented on voting rolls relative to the eligible population. African Americans who had been barred from registering to vote finally had an alternative to taking suits to local or state courts, which had seldom prosecuted their cases successfully. If discrimination in voter registration occurred, the 1965 act authorized the Attorney General of the United States to send Federal examiners to replace local registrars.

Within months of the bill's passage, 250,000 new black voters had been registered, one-third of them by federal examiners. Within four years, voter registration in the South had more than doubled. In 1965, Mississippi had the highest black voter turnout at 74% and led the nation in the number of black public officials elected. In 1969, Tennessee had a 92% turnout among black voters; Arkansas, 78%; and Texas, 73%.

Several whites who had opposed the Voting Rights Act paid a quick price. In 1966, Sheriff Jim Clark of Selma, Alabama, infamous for using cattle prods against civil rights marchers, was up for reelection. Although he took off the notorious "Never" pin on his uniform, he was defeated. At the election, Clark lost as Black people voted to get him out of office.

Black people regaining the power to vote changed the political landscape of the South. When Congress passed the Voting Rights Act, only about 100 African Americans held elective office, all in northern states. By 1989, there were more than 7,200 African Americans in office, including more than 4,800 in the South. Nearly every county in Alabama where the population was majority black had a black sheriff. Southern Black people held top positions in city, county, and state governments.

Atlanta elected a black mayor in 1982, Andrew Young, as did Jackson, Mississippi in 1997, with Harvey Johnson Jr., and New Orleans in 1978, with Ernest Morial. National-level Black politicians included Barbara Jordan, elected as a Representative from Texas in 1973, and President Jimmy Carter appointed Andrew Young as United States Ambassador to the United Nations. Julian Bond was elected to the Georgia State Legislature in 1965, although political reaction to his public opposition to the U.S. involvement in the Vietnam War prevented him from taking his seat until 1967. John Lewis was first elected in 1986 to represent Georgia's 5th congressional district in the United States House of Representatives, where he served from 1987 until he died in 2020. There were only two Black members of Congress from the states of the former Confederacy elected in 1980, and four elected in 1990, but this rose to 16 in 2000.

=== Fair housing movements, 1966–1968 ===
The first major blow against housing segregation in the era, the Rumford Fair Housing Act, was passed in California in 1963. It was overturned by white California voters and real estate lobbyists the following year with Proposition 14, a move which helped precipitate the Watts riots. In 1966, the California Supreme Court invalidated Proposition 14 and reinstated the Rumford Fair Housing Act.

Working and organizing for fair housing laws became a major project of the movement over the next two years, with Martin Luther King Jr., James Bevel, and Al Raby leading the Chicago Freedom Movement around the issue in 1966. In the following year, Father James Groppi and the NAACP Youth Council also attracted national attention with a fair housing campaign in Milwaukee. Both movements faced violent resistance from white homeowners and legal opposition from conservative politicians.

The Fair Housing Bill was the most contentious civil rights legislation of the era. Senator Walter Mondale, who advocated for the bill, noted that over successive years, it was the most filibustered legislation in U.S. history. It was opposed by most Northern and Southern senators, as well as the National Association of Real Estate Boards. A proposed "Civil Rights Act of 1966" had collapsed completely because of its fair housing provision. Mondale commented that:

A lot of civil rights [legislation] was about making the South behave and taking the teeth from George Wallace, [but] this came right to the neighborhoods across the country. This was civil rights getting personal.

=== Nationwide riots, 1965–1967 ===
In the mid-1960s, the U.S. experienced a series of "long hot summers" of civil unrest. While the early civil rights movement primarily focused on legal challenges to segregation in the South, the "long hot summers" brought attention to the racial disparities and issues within urban communities in the North. Systemic racism, police brutality, high unemployment rates, poor living conditions in urban Black neighborhoods, and a sense of hopelessness contributed to the widespread unrest.

==== Watts ====
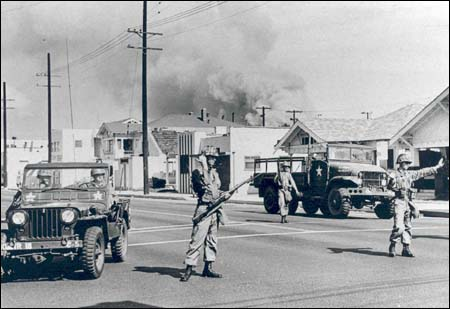
Soldiers direct traffic away from an area of South Central Los Angeles burning during the 1965 Watts riot

The momentum for the advancement of civil rights came to a sudden halt in August 1965 with riots in the Watts district of Los Angeles. The riots were ignited by the arrest of Marquette Frye during a traffic stop, which escalated into a physical confrontation with police officers and drew a large crowd of onlookers. During the six days of unrest, rioters engaged in widespread looting of stores, burning buildings through arson, and in some cases, using sniper tactics to fire at authorities. To quell the violence, National Guard troops were deployed to the area and imposed a curfew.

After 34 people were killed and $35 million (equivalent to $357.58 million in 2025) in property was damaged, the public feared an expansion of the violence to other cities, and so the appetite for additional programs in President Lyndon Johnson's agenda was lost.

==== Newark and Detroit ====
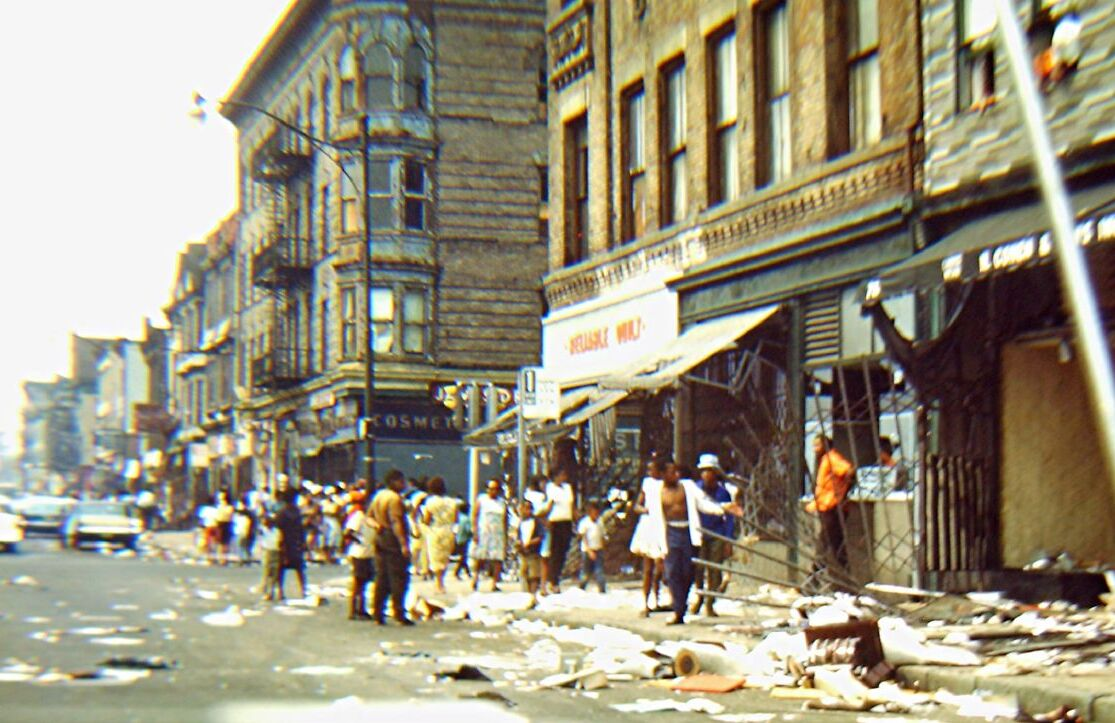
1967 Newark riots

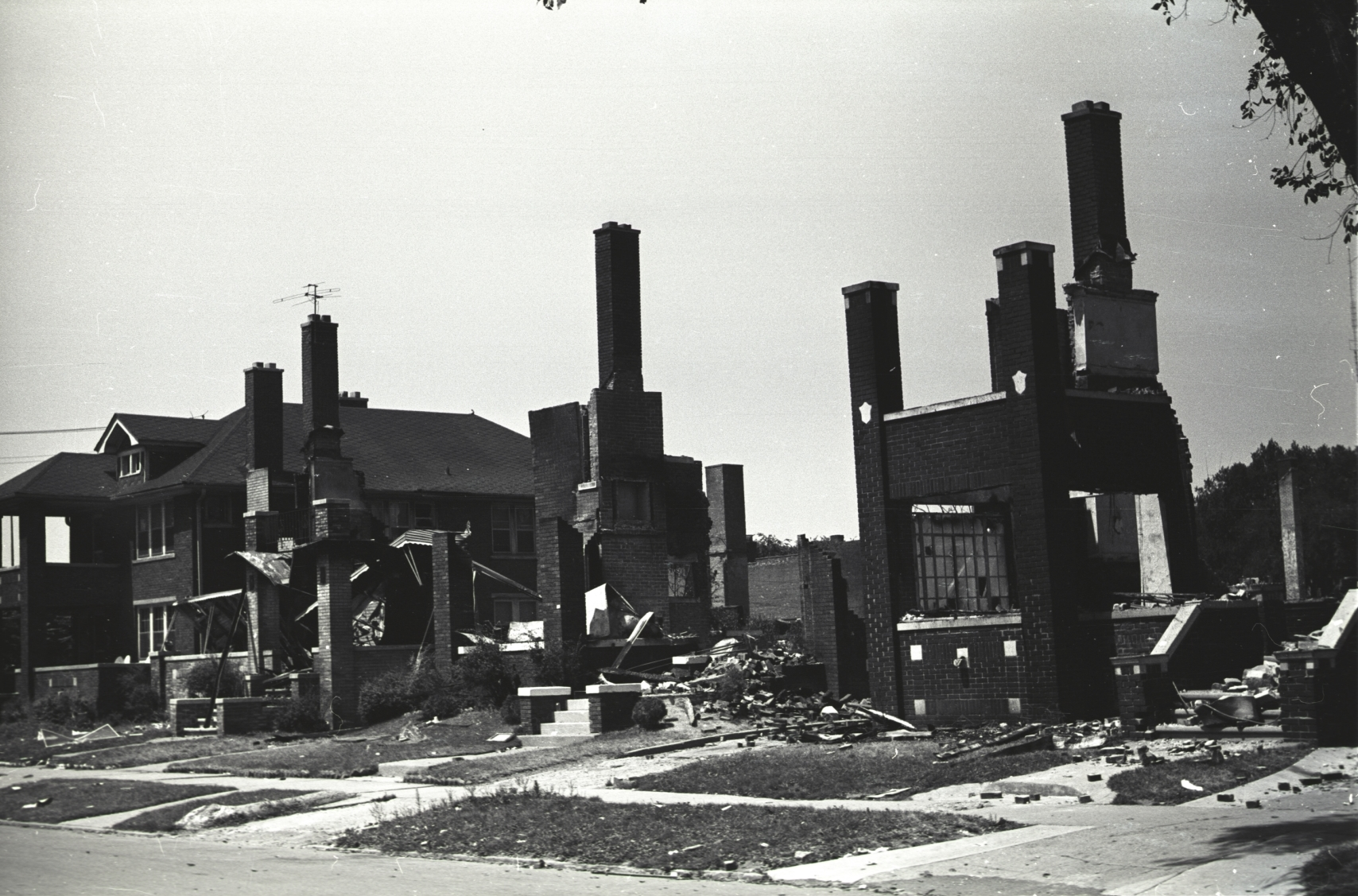
Destroyed buildings during the 1967 Detroit riots

Occurring well after the conclusion of the 1966 Chicago open housing movement, in what is known as the "Long hot summer of 1967" more than 150 riots erupted across the United States, with the most destructive occurring in Detroit, Michigan, and Newark, New Jersey. The Boston Globe called it "a revolution of black Americans against white Americans, a violent petition for the redress of long-standing grievances." The Globe asserted that Great Society legislation had affected little fundamental improvement.

The Newark riots were sparked by the arrest and beating of John William Smith, a Black cab driver, by police officers. The unrest lasted for five days, involving widespread looting, arson, and violent confrontations with police and National Guard troops. Some 26 people were killed, more than 700 were injured, and more than 1,000 residents were arrested.

In Detroit, a large black middle class had begun to develop among those African Americans who worked at unionized jobs in the automotive industry. These workers complained of persisting racist practices, limiting the jobs they could have, and opportunities for promotion. The United Auto Workers channeled these complaints into bureaucratic and ineffective grievance procedures. Violent white mobs enforced the segregation of housing up through the 1960s. The Detroit riots were sparked by a police raid on an unlicensed after-hours bar, commonly called the "Blind Pig," in a predominantly Black neighborhood. The riots lasted for five days, causing significant property damage, 1,200 injuries, and at least 43 deaths (33 of those killed were Black residents of the city). Governor George Romney sent in 7,400 National Guard troops to quell fire bombings, looting, and attacks on businesses and police. President Lyndon Johnson deployed U.S. Army troops with tanks and machine guns. Residents reported that police officers and National Guardsmen shot at black civilians and suspects indiscriminately.

At an August 2, 1967 cabinet meeting, Attorney General Ramsey Clark warned that untrained and undisciplined local police forces and National Guardsmen might trigger a "guerrilla war in the streets," as evidenced by the climate of sniper fire in Newark and Detroit. Snipers were a significant element in many of the riots, creating a dangerous situation for both law enforcement and civilians, with shooters often targeting from rooftops and other concealed locations.

==== Kerner Commission ====
The riots confounded many civil rights activists of both races, given the recent passage of major civil rights legislation. They also caused a backlash among Northern whites, many of whom stopped supporting civil rights causes. President Johnson formed the National Advisory Commission on Civil Disorders, informally known as the Kerner Commission, on July 28, 1967, to explore the causes behind the recurring outbreaks of urban civil disorder. The commission's scope included the 164 disorders occurring in the first nine months of 1967. The president had directed them, in simple words, to document what happened, find out why it happened, and find out how to prevent it.

The commission's 1968 report identified police practices, unemployment and underemployment, and lack of adequate housing as the most significant grievances motivating the rage. It suggested legislative measures to promote racial integration and alleviate poverty and concluded that the nation was "moving toward two societies, one black, one white—separate and unequal." The president, fixated on the Vietnam War and keenly aware of budgetary constraints, barely acknowledged the report.

=== Memphis, King assassination, and Civil Rights Act of 1968 ===
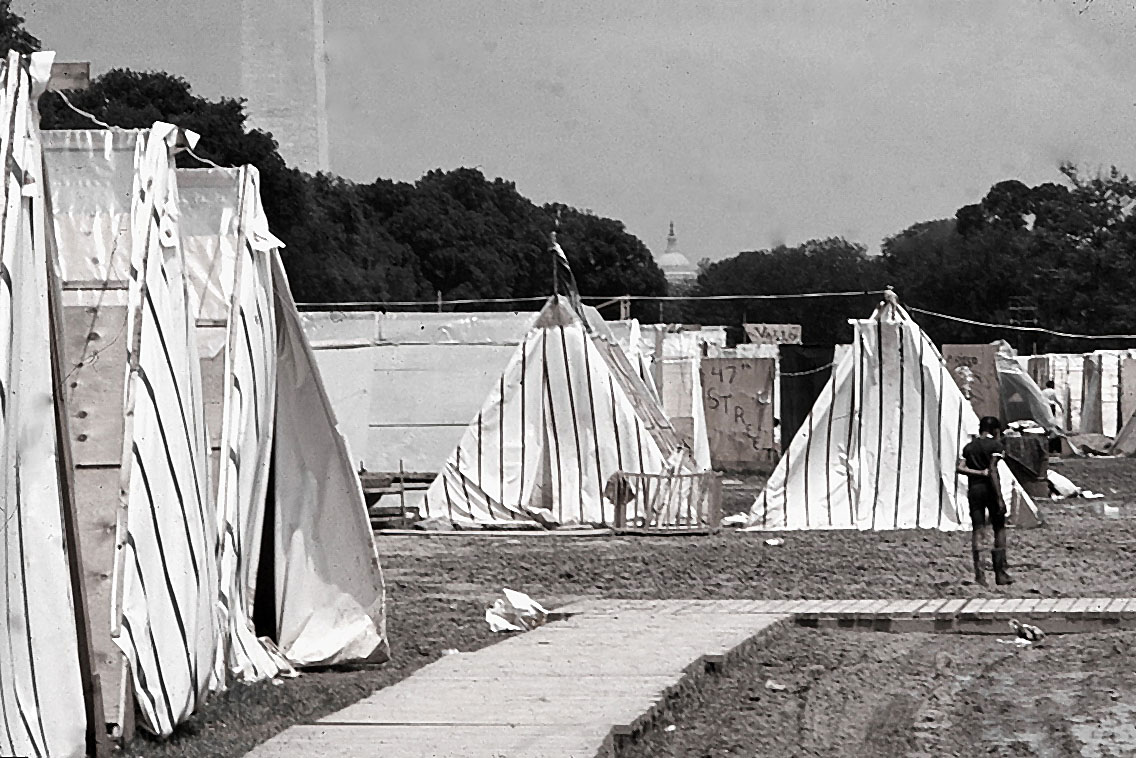
A 3,000-person shantytown called Resurrection City was established in 1968 on the National Mall as part of the Poor People's Campaign.

As 1968 began, the fair housing bill was being filibustered once again, but two developments revived it. The Kerner Commission report on the 1967 ghetto riots was delivered to Congress on March 1, and it strongly recommended "a comprehensive and enforceable federal open housing law" as a remedy to the civil disturbances. The Senate was moved to end its filibuster that week.

James Lawson invited King to Memphis, Tennessee, in March 1968 to support a sanitation workers' strike. These workers launched a campaign for union representation after two workers were accidentally killed on the job; they were seeking fair wages and improved working conditions. King considered their struggle to be a vital part of the Poor People's Campaign he was planning.

"I've Been to the Mountaintop"
Final 30 seconds of "I've Been to the Mountaintop" speech by Martin Luther King Jr. These are the final words from his final public speech.

A day after delivering his stirring "I've Been to the Mountaintop" sermon, which has become famous for his vision of American society, King was assassinated on April 4, 1968, at the Lorraine Motel in Memphis. Riots broke out in black neighborhoods in more than 110 cities across the United States in the days that followed, notably in Chicago, Baltimore, and Washington, D.C.

The day before King's funeral, April 8, a completely silent march with Coretta Scott King, SCLC, and UAW president Walter Reuther attracted approximately 42,000 participants. Armed National Guardsmen lined the streets, sitting on M-48 tanks, to protect the marchers, and helicopters circled overhead. On April 9, Mrs. King led another 150,000 people in a funeral procession through the streets of Atlanta. Her dignity revived courage and hope in many of the Movement's members, confirming her place as the new leader in the struggle for racial equality.

Coretta Scott King said,

Martin Luther King Jr. gave his life for the poor of the world, the garbage workers of Memphis and the peasants of Vietnam. The day that Negro people and others in bondage are truly free, on the day want is abolished, on the day wars are no more, on that day I know my husband will rest in a long-deserved peace.

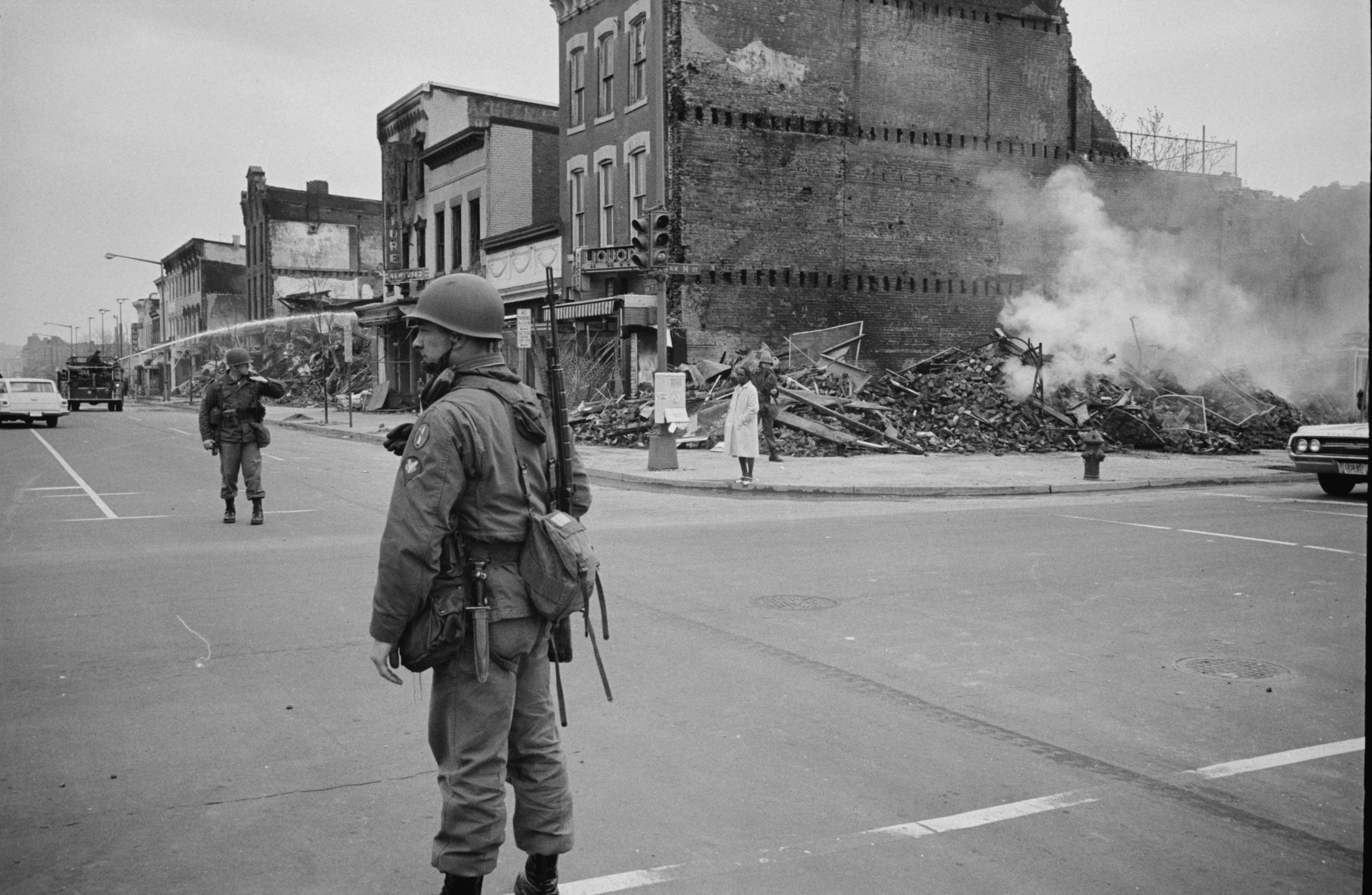
Aftermath of the King assassination riots in Washington, D.C.

Ralph Abernathy succeeded King as the head of the SCLC and attempted to carry forth King's plan for a Poor People's March. It was to unite Black people and whites to campaign for fundamental changes in American society and economic structure. The march went forward under Abernathy's plainspoken leadership but did not achieve its goals.

==== Civil Rights Act of 1968 ====
The U.S. House of Representatives had been deliberating its Fair Housing Act in early April, before King's assassination and the aforementioned wave of unrest that followed, the largest since the Civil War. Senator Charles Mathias wrote:

[S]ome Senators and Representatives publicly stated they would not be intimidated or rushed into legislating because of the disturbances. Nevertheless, the news coverage of the riots and the underlying disparities in income, jobs, housing, and education, between White and Black Americans helped educate citizens and Congress about the stark reality of an enormous social problem. Members of Congress knew they had to act to redress these imbalances in American life to fulfill the dream that King had so eloquently preached.

The House passed the legislation on April 10, less than a week after King was murdered, and President Johnson signed it the next day. The Civil Rights Act of 1968 prohibited discrimination concerning the sale, rental, and financing of housing based on race, religion, and national origin. It also made it a federal crime to "by force or by the threat of force, injure, intimidate, or interfere with anyone...by reason of their race, color, religion, or national origin."

=== Gates v. Collier ===
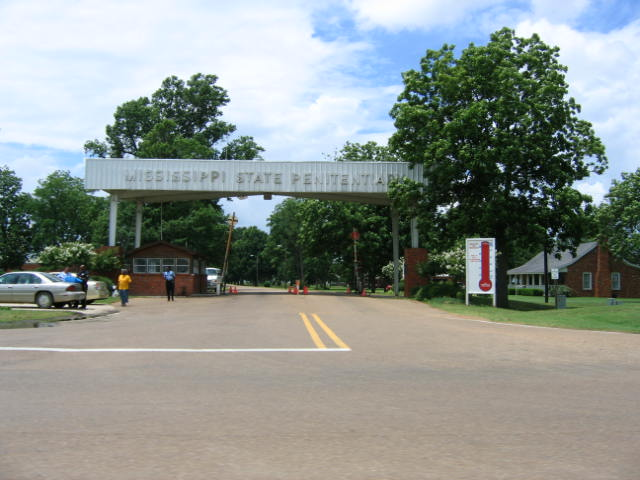
Mississippi State Penitentiary

Conditions at the Mississippi State Penitentiary at Parchman, then known as Parchman Farm, became part of public civil rights discussions after activists were imprisoned there. In the spring of 1961, Freedom Riders came to the South to test the desegregation of public facilities. By the end of June 1963, Freedom Riders had been convicted in Jackson, Mississippi. Many were jailed in the Mississippi State Penitentiary at Parchman. Mississippi employed the trusty system, a hierarchical order of inmates that used some inmates to control and enforce punishment of other inmates.

In 1970, the civil rights lawyer Roy Haber began taking statements from inmates. He collected 50 pages of details of murders, rapes, beatings, and other abuses suffered by the inmates from 1969 to 1971 at the Mississippi State Penitentiary. In a landmark case known as Gates v. Collier (1972), four inmates represented by Haber sued the superintendent of Parchman Farm for violating their rights under the United States Constitution.

Federal Judge William C. Keady found in favor of the inmates, writing that Parchman Farm violated the civil rights of the inmates by inflicting cruel and unusual punishment. He ordered an immediate end to all unconstitutional conditions and practices. Racial segregation of inmates was abolished, as was the trusty system, which allowed certain inmates to have power and control over others.

The prison was renovated in 1972 after the scathing ruling by Keady, who wrote that the prison was an affront to "modern standards of decency." Among other reforms, the accommodations were made habitable. The system of trusties was abolished. (The prison had armed lifers with rifles and given them authority to oversee and guard other inmates, which led to many cases of abuse and murders.)

In integrated correctional facilities in northern and western states, Black people represented a disproportionate number of prisoners, in excess of their proportion of the general population. They were often treated as second-class citizens by white correctional officers. Black people also represented a disproportionately high number of death row inmates. Eldridge Cleaver's book Soul on Ice was written from his experiences in the California correctional system; it contributed to black militancy.

=== Legacy ===
Civil rights protest activity had an observable impact on white Americans' views on race and politics over time. White people who live in counties in which civil rights protests of historical significance occurred have been found to have lower levels of racial resentment against Black people, are more likely to identify with the Democratic Party, as well as more likely to support affirmative action.

One study found that non-violent activism of the era tended to produce favorable media coverage and changes in public opinion, focusing on the issues organizers were raising, but violent protests tended to generate unfavorable media coverage that generated public desire to restore law and order.

The 1964 Act was passed to end discrimination in various fields based on race, color, religion, sex, or national origin in employment and public accommodations. The 1964 Act did not prohibit sex discrimination against persons employed at educational institutions. A parallel law, Title VI, was also enacted in 1964 to prohibit discrimination in federally funded public and private entities. It covered race, color, and national origin but excluded sex. Feminists during the early 1970s lobbied Congress to add sex as a protected class category. In 1972, Title IX was enacted to fill this gap and prohibit discrimination in all federally funded education programs. Title IX, or the Education Amendments of 1972, was later renamed the Patsy T. Mink Equal Opportunity in Education Act following Mink's death in 2002.

== Characteristics ==
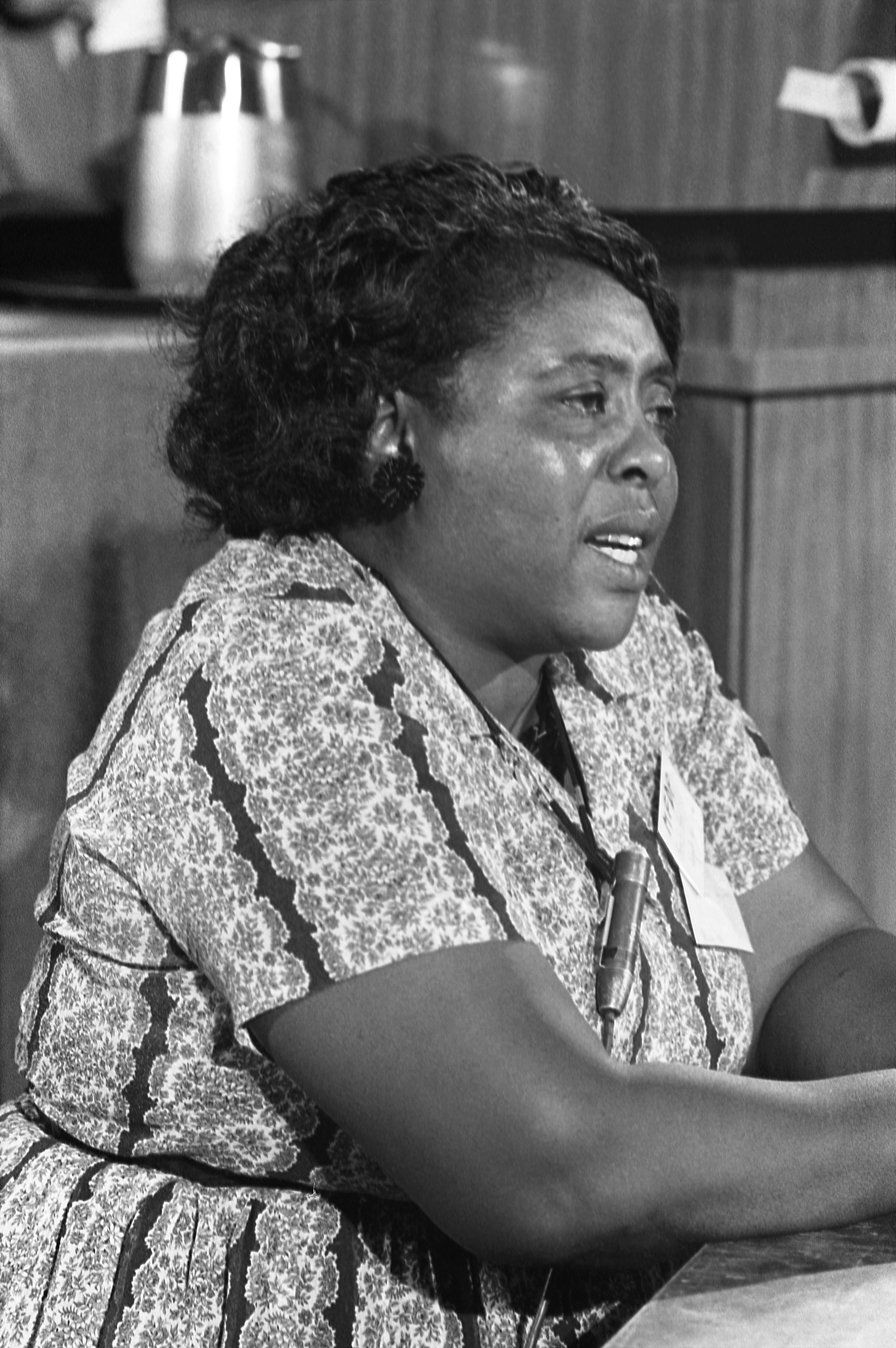
Fannie Lou Hamer of the Mississippi Freedom Democratic Party (and other Mississippi-based organizations) is an example of local grassroots leadership in the movement.

=== African-American women ===
African-American women in the civil rights movement were pivotal to its success. They volunteered as activists, advocates, educators, clerics, writers, spiritual guides, caretakers, and politicians for the civil rights movement, leading and participating in organizations that contributed to the cause of civil rights. Rosa Parks's refusal to sit at the back of a public bus resulted in the year-long Montgomery bus boycott, and the eventual desegregation of interstate travel in the United States. Women were members of the NAACP because they believed it could help them contribute to the cause of civil rights. Some of those involved with the Black Panthers were nationally recognized as leaders, and still others did editorial work on the Black Panther newspaper spurring internal discussions about gender issues. Ella Baker founded the SNCC and was a prominent figure in the civil rights movement. Female students involved with the SNCC helped to organize sit-ins and the Freedom Rides. At the same time many elderly black women in towns across the Southern US cared for the organization's volunteers at their homes, providing the students food, a bed, healing aid and motherly love. Other women involved also formed church groups, bridge clubs, and professional organizations, such as the National Council of Negro Women, to help achieve freedom for themselves and their race. Several who participated in these organizations lost their jobs because of their involvement.

==== Sexist discrimination ====
Many women who participated in the movement experienced gender discrimination and sexual harassment. There are many other accounts and examples throughout history. Although women formed the backbone of many civil rights movements from behind the scenes efforts (ex. grassroot campaigns, sustained community support, and recruiting), they were routinely excluded from formal leadership roles. In the Southern Christian Leadership Conference (SCLC), for example, Ella Baker's strategic insights and organizing expertise were repeatedly undervalued, despite her being the most experienced staff member. In a journal by Robnett (1996), she illustrates how Bakers experience was not an exception but a part of a greater pattern in which black women were confined to a term called "bridge leadership". "Bridge leadership" is the term for someone who plays a crucial but undervalued role linking community members to formal structures of political movement. This hierarchy is often gendered, meaning male leaders received public recognition and authority, while women shouldered the bulk of the labor. Other significant accounts are documented similarly across the SNCC, CORE, and local NAACP branches, where women challenged sexist assumptions even as they fought racial injustice.

=== Avoiding the "Communist" label ===
On December 17, 1951, the Communist Party–affiliated Civil Rights Congress delivered the petition We Charge Genocide: The Crime of Government Against the Negro People to the United Nations, arguing that the U.S. federal government, by its failure to act against lynching in the United States, was guilty of genocide under Article II of the UN Genocide Convention (see Black genocide). The petition was presented to the United Nations at two separate venues: Paul Robeson, a concert singer and activist, presented it to a UN official in New York City, while William L. Patterson, executive director of the CRC, delivered copies of the drafted petition to a UN delegation in Paris.

Patterson, the editor of the petition, was a leader of the Communist Party USA and head of the International Labor Defense, a group that offered legal representation to communists, trade unionists, and African Americans in cases involving political or racial persecution. The ILD was known for leading the defense of the Scottsboro Boys in Alabama in 1931, a time when the Communist Party had considerable influence among African Americans. This influence had largely declined by the late 1950s, although it could command international attention. As earlier civil rights figures such as Robeson, Du Bois, and Patterson became more politically radical (and therefore targets of Cold War anti-Communism by the U.S. Government), they lost favor with mainstream Black America as well as with the NAACP.

To secure a place in the political mainstream and gain the broadest base of support, the new generation of civil rights activists believed it had to openly distance itself from anything and anyone associated with the Communist Party. According to Ella Baker, the Southern Christian Leadership Conference added the word "Christian" to its name to deter charges that it was associated with Communism. Under J. Edgar Hoover, the FBI had been concerned about communism since the early 20th century, and it kept civil rights activists under close surveillance and labeled some of them "Communist" or "subversive", a practice that continued during the civil rights movement. In the early 1960s, the practice of distancing the civil rights movement from "Reds" was challenged by the Student Nonviolent Coordinating Committee, which adopted a policy of accepting assistance and participation from anyone who supported the SNCC's political program and was willing to "put their body on the line, regardless of political affiliation." At times, the SNCC's policy of political openness put it at odds with the NAACP.

=== Grassroots leadership ===
While most popular representations of the movement center on the leadership and philosophy of Martin Luther King Jr., some scholars note that the movement was too diverse to be attributed to a single person, organization, or strategy. Sociologist Doug McAdam has stated that, "in King's case, it would be inaccurate to say that he was the leader of the modern civil rights movement...but more importantly, there was no singular civil rights movement. The movement was, in fact, a coalition of thousands of local efforts nationwide, spanning several decades, hundreds of discrete groups, and all manner of strategies and tactics—legal, illegal, institutional, non-institutional, violent, non-violent. Without discounting King's importance, it would be sheer fiction to call him the leader of what was fundamentally an amorphous, fluid, dispersed movement." Decentralized grassroots leadership has been a major focus of movement scholarship in recent decades through the work of historians John Dittmer, Charles Payne, Barbara Ransby, and others.

=== Tactics and nonviolence ===
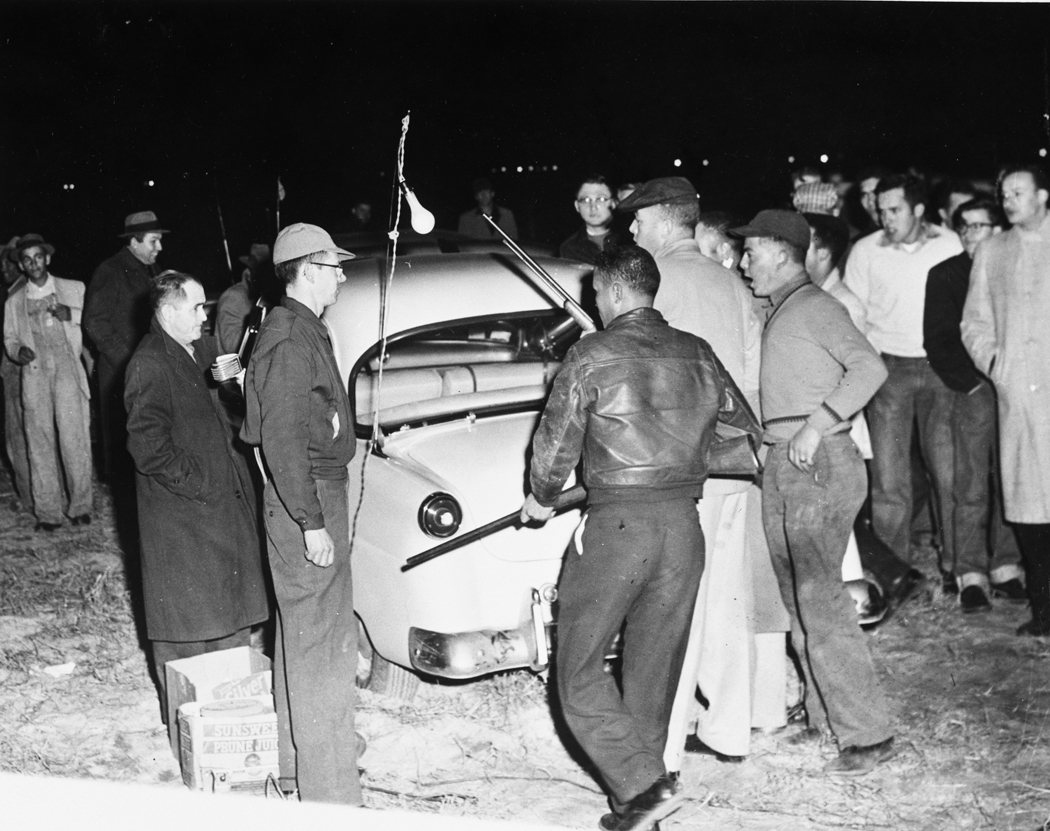
Armed Lumbee Indians aggressively confronting Klansmen in the Battle of Hayes Pond

The Jim Crow system employed "terror as a means of social control," with the most organized manifestations being the Ku Klux Klan and their collaborators in local police departments. This violence played a key role in blocking the civil rights movement's progress in the late 1950s. Some black organizations in the South began practicing armed self-defense. The first to do so openly was the Monroe, North Carolina, chapter of the NAACP led by Robert F. Williams. Williams had rebuilt the chapter after its membership was terrorized out of public life by the Klan. He did so by encouraging a new, more working-class membership to arm itself thoroughly and defend against attack. When Klan nightriders attacked the home of NAACP member Albert Perry in October 1957, Williams' militia exchanged gunfire with the stunned Klansmen, who quickly retreated. The following day, the city council held an emergency session and passed an ordinance banning KKK motorcades. One year later, Lumbee Indians in North Carolina would have a similarly successful armed stand-off with the Klan (known as the Battle of Hayes Pond), which resulted in KKK leader James W. "Catfish" Cole being convicted of incitement to riot.

After the acquittal of several white men charged with sexually assaulting black women in Monroe, Williams announced to United Press International reporters that he would "meet violence with violence" as a policy. Williams' declaration was quoted on the front page of The New York Times, and The Carolina Times considered it "the biggest civil rights story of 1959". NAACP National chairman Roy Wilkins immediately suspended Williams from his position, but the Monroe organizer won support from numerous NAACP chapters across the country. Ultimately, Wilkins resorted to bribing influential organizer Daisy Bates to campaign against Williams at the NAACP national convention, and the suspension was upheld. The convention nonetheless passed a resolution which stated: "We do not deny, but reaffirm the right of individual and collective self-defense against unlawful assaults." Martin Luther King Jr. argued for Williams' removal, but Ella Baker and WEB Dubois both publicly praised the Monroe leader's position.

Williams—along with his wife, Mabel Williams—continued to play a leadership role in the Monroe movement, and to some degree, in the national movement. The Williamses published The Crusader, a nationally circulated newsletter, beginning in 1960, and the influential book Negroes With Guns in 1962. Williams did not call for full militarization in this period, but "flexibility in the freedom struggle." Williams was well-versed in legal tactics and publicity, which he had used successfully in the internationally known "Kissing Case" of 1958, as well as nonviolent methods, which he used at lunch counter sit-ins in Monroe—all with armed self-defense as a complementary tactic.

Williams led the Monroe movement in another armed stand-off with white supremacists during an August 1961 Freedom Ride; he had been invited to participate in the campaign by Ella Baker and James Forman of the Student Nonviolent Coordinating Committee (SNCC). The incident (along with his campaigns for peace with Cuba) resulted in him being targeted by the FBI and prosecuted for kidnapping; he was cleared of all charges in 1976. Meanwhile, armed self-defense continued discreetly in the Southern movement with such figures as SNCC's Amzie Moore, Hartman Turnbow, and Fannie Lou Hamer all willing to use arms to defend their lives from nightrides. Taking refuge from the FBI in Cuba, the Willamses broadcast the radio show Radio Free Dixie throughout the eastern United States via Radio Progresso beginning in 1962. In this period, Williams advocated guerrilla warfare against racist institutions and saw the large ghetto riots of the era as a manifestation of his strategy.

University of North Carolina historian Walter Rucker has written that "the emergence of Robert F Williams contributed to the marked decline in anti-black racial violence in the U.S....After centuries of anti-black violence, African Americans across the country began to defend their communities aggressively—employing overt force when necessary. This in turn evoked in whites real fear of black vengeance..." This opened up space for African Americans to use nonviolent demonstrations with less fear of deadly reprisal. Of the many civil rights activists who share this view, the most prominent was Rosa Parks. Parks gave the eulogy at Williams' funeral in 1996, praising him for "his courage and for his commitment to freedom," and concluding that "The sacrifices he made, and what he did, should go down in history and never be forgotten."

=== Jewish support for the movement ===
Jewish Americans played an active role in supporting the civil rights movement. They were actively involved in establishing and supporting a number of the most important civil rights organizations, including the NAACP, the Leadership Conference on Civil and Human Rights, the Southern Christian Leadership Conference (SCLC), and the Student Nonviolent Coordinating Committee (SNCC). These organizations played pivotal roles in the civil rights movement, advocating for racial equality and justice.

Despite representing less than 2% of the US population, Jewish people made up roughly half of all civil rights lawyers in the South during the 1960s and half of the white northern volunteers involved in the 1964 Mississippi Freedom Summer project.

=== Opposition to police brutality ===
Organizers from the Congress of Racial Equality and the Student Nonviolent Coordinating Committee confronted police violence with sit-ins at precinct stations, picketing outside department headquarters, and blocking traffic to draw attention to officer misdeeds. In return, activists found themselves the targets of political repression in the form of pervasive police surveillance, infiltration by undercover officers, and retaliatory prosecutions aimed at discrediting their movement. Many civil rights leaders—including Martin Luther King Jr., Ella Baker, James Forman, Fannie Lou Hamer, and John Lewis—criticized police brutality in writing and speeches at various points.

== Political responses ==
=== Truman administration: 1945–1953 ===
Partly in response to the March on Washington Movement under Truman's predecessor, Franklin D. Roosevelt, the Fair Employment Practices Committee was created to address racial discrimination in employment, and in 1946, Truman created the President's Committee on Civil Rights. On June 29, 1947, Truman became the first president to address the demands of the National Association for the Advancement of Colored People (NAACP). The speech took place at the Lincoln Memorial during the NAACP convention and was carried nationally on the radio. In that speech, Truman laid out his agreement with the need to end discrimination, which he would advance through the first comprehensive, presidentially proposed civil rights legislation. Truman on "civil rights and human freedom" declared:

… Our immediate task is to remove the last remnants of the barriers which stand between millions of our citizens and their birthright. There is no justifiable reason for discrimination because of ancestry, or religion, or race, or color. We must not tolerate such limitations on the freedom of any of our people and on their enjoyment of basic rights which every citizen in a truly democratic society must possess.

In February 1948, Truman delivered a formal message to Congress requesting adoption of his 10-point program to secure civil rights, including anti-lynching, voter rights, and the elimination of segregation. "No political act since the Compromise of 1877," argued biographer Taylor Branch, "so profoundly influenced race relations; in a sense it was a repeal of 1877." Truman was opposed by the conservative coalition in congress, so instead issued Executive Orders 9980 and 9981 ending discrimination in federal employment and in the armed forces.

=== Eisenhower administration: 1953–1961 ===
While not a key focus of his administration, President Eisenhower made several conservative strides toward making America a racially integrated country. The year he was elected, Eisenhower desegregated Washington D.C. after hearing a story about an African American man who was unable to rent a hotel room, buy a meal, access drinking water, and attend a movie. Shortly after this act, Eisenhower utilized Hollywood personalities to pressure movie theatres into desegregating as well.

Under the previous administration, President Truman signed Executive Order 9981 to desegregate the military. However, Truman's executive order had hardly been enforced. President Eisenhower made it a point to enforce the executive order. By October 30, 1954, there were no segregated combat units in the United States. Not only this, but Eisenhower also desegregated the Veterans Administration and military bases in the South, including federal schools for military dependents. Expanding his work beyond the military, Eisenhower formed two non-discrimination committees, one to broker nondiscrimination agreements with government contractors and a second to end discrimination within government departments and agencies.

The first major piece of civil rights legislation since the Civil Rights Act of 1875 was also passed under the Eisenhower administration. President Eisenhower proposed, championed, and signed the Civil Rights Act of 1957. The legislation established the Civil Rights Commission and the Justice Department's Civil Rights Division, and banned intimidation, coercion, and other means of interfering with a citizen's right to vote. Eisenhower's work in desegregating the judicial system is also notable. The judges he appointed were liberal when it came to the subject of civil rights/desegregation, and he actively avoided placing segregationists in federal courts.

=== Kennedy administration: 1961–1963 ===
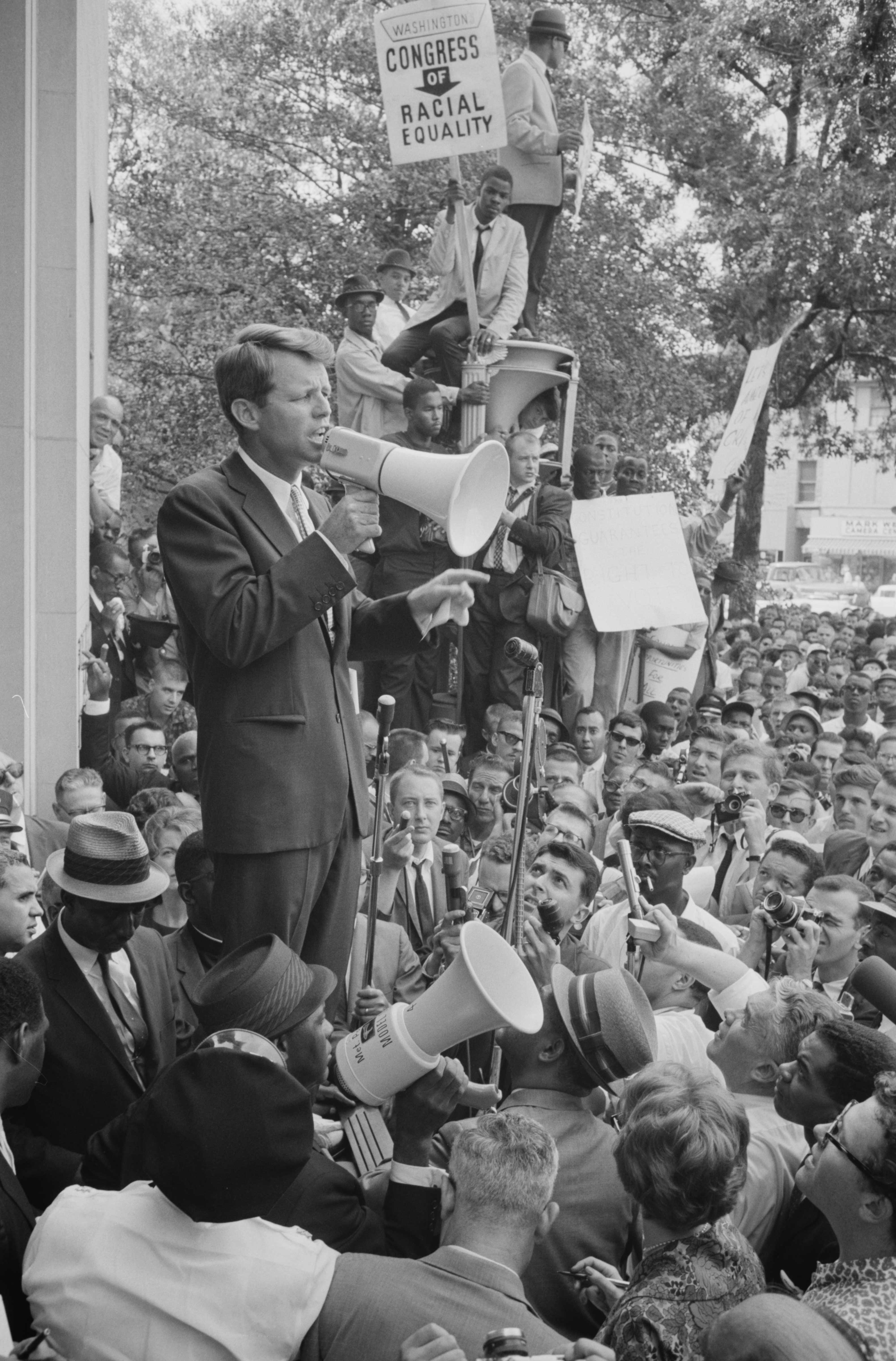
Attorney General Robert F. Kennedy speaking before a hostile civil rights crowd protesting low minority hiring in his Justice Department, June 14, 1963

For the first two years of the Kennedy administration, civil rights activists had mixed opinions of both the president and his younger brother, Robert F. Kennedy, the Attorney General. Historian David Halberstam wrote that the race question was for a long time a minor ethnic political issue in Massachusetts, where the Kennedy brothers came from, and had they been from another part of the country, "they might have been more immediately sensitive to the complexities and depth of black feelings." A well of historical skepticism toward liberal politics had left African Americans with a sense of uneasy disdain for any white politician who claimed to share their concerns for freedom, particularly ones connected to the historically pro-segregationist Democratic Party. Still, many were encouraged by the discreet support Kennedy gave to King and the administration's willingness, after dramatic pressure from civil disobedience, to introduce racially egalitarian initiatives.

Robert F. Kennedy expressed the administration's commitment to civil rights during a May 6, 1961 speech at the University of Georgia Law School:

Our position is quite clear. We are upholding the law. The federal government would not be running the schools in Prince Edward County any more than it is running the University of Georgia or the schools in my home state of Massachusetts. In this case, in all cases, I say to you today that if the orders of the court are circumvented, the Department of Justice will act. We will not stand by or be aloof—we will move. I happen to believe that the 1954 decision was right. But my belief does not matter. It is now the law. Some of you may believe the decision was wrong. That does not matter. It is the law.

Many of the initiatives resulted from Robert Kennedy's passion. The younger Kennedy gained a rapid education in the realities of racism through events such as the Baldwin–Kennedy meeting. The president came to share his brother's sense of urgency on the matter, resulting in the landmark Civil Rights Address of June 1963 and the introduction of the first major civil rights act of the decade.

That same month, during the Freedom Rides, Robert Kennedy became concerned with the issue when photographs of the burning bus and savage beatings in Anniston and Birmingham were broadcast around the world. They came at an especially embarrassing time, as President Kennedy was about to have a summit with the Soviet premier in Vienna. The White House was concerned with its image among the populations of newly independent nations in Africa and Asia, and Robert Kennedy responded with an address for Voice of America stating that great progress had been made on the issue of race relations. Meanwhile, behind the scenes, the administration worked to resolve the crisis with minimal violence and to prevent the Freedom Riders from generating a fresh crop of headlines that might divert attention from the President's international agenda. The Freedom Riders documentary notes that, "The back burner issue of civil rights had collided with the urgent demands of Cold War realpolitik."

On May 21, when a white mob attacked and burned the First Baptist Church in Montgomery, Alabama, where King was holding out with protesters, Robert Kennedy telephoned King to ask him to stay in the building until the U.S. Marshals and National Guard could secure the area. King proceeded to berate Kennedy for "allowing the situation to continue". King later publicly thanked Kennedy for deploying the force to break up an attack that might otherwise have ended King's life.

With a very small majority in Congress, the president's ability to press ahead with legislation relied considerably on a balancing game with the Senators and Congressmen of the South. Without the support of Vice President Johnson, a former Senator with years of experience in Congress and longstanding ties there, many of the Attorney-General's programs would not have progressed.

By late 1962, frustration at the slow pace of political change was balanced by the movement's strong support for legislative initiatives, including administrative representation across all U.S. Government departments and greater access to the ballot box. From squaring off against Governor George Wallace, to "tearing into" Vice President Johnson (for failing to desegregate areas of the administration), to threatening corrupt white Southern judges with disbarment, to desegregating interstate transport, Robert Kennedy came to be consumed by the civil rights movement. He continued to work on these social justice issues in his 1968 bid for the presidency.

On the night of Governor Wallace's capitulation to African-American enrollment at the University of Alabama, President Kennedy gave an address to the nation, which marked the changing tide. This address would become a landmark in the ensuing shift in political policy regarding civil rights. In 1966, Robert Kennedy visited South Africa and voiced his objections to apartheid, the first time a major US politician had done so:

At the University of Natal in Durban, I was told the church to which most of the white population belongs teaches apartheid as a moral necessity. A questioner declared that few churches allow black Africans to pray with the white because the Bible says that is the way it should be, because God created Negroes to serve. "But suppose God is black", I replied. "What if we go to Heaven and we, all our lives, have treated the Negro as an inferior, and God is there, and we look up and He is not white? What then is our response?" There was no answer. Only silence.

— LOOK Magazine

Robert Kennedy's relationship with the movement was not always positive. As attorney general, he was called to account by activists—who booed him at a June 1963 speech—for the Justice Department's own poor record of hiring Black people. He also presided over FBI Director J. Edgar Hoover and his COINTELPRO program. This program ordered FBI agents to "expose, disrupt, misdirect, discredit, or otherwise neutralize" the activities of Communist front groups, a category in which the paranoid Hoover included most civil rights organizations. Kennedy personally authorized some of the programs. According to Tim Weiner, "RFK knew much more about this surveillance than he ever admitted." Although Kennedy only approved the limited wiretapping of King's phones "on a trial basis, for a month or so." Hoover extended the clearance so his men were "unshackled" to look for evidence in any areas of the black leader's life they deemed important; they then used this information to harass King. Kennedy directly ordered surveillance on James Baldwin after their antagonistic racial summit in 1963.

=== Johnson administration: 1963–1969 ===
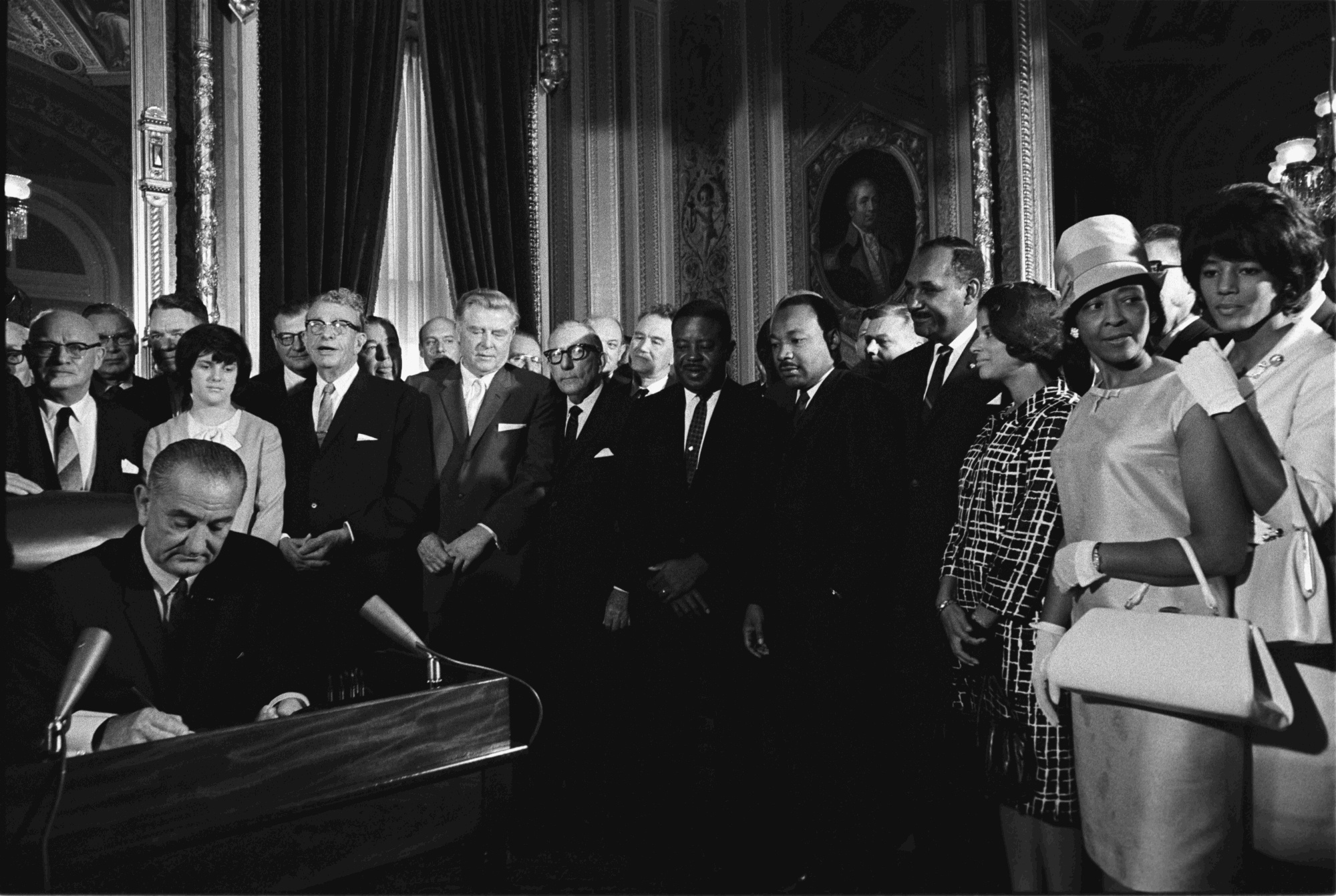
President Lyndon B. Johnson signs the Voting Rights Act of 1965

Lyndon Johnson made civil rights one of his highest priorities, coupling it with his War on Poverty. However, the increasing opposition to the Vietnam War, coupled with the cost of the war, undercut support for his domestic programs.

Under Kennedy, major civil rights legislation had been stalled in Congress. His assassination changed everything. On one hand, President Lyndon Johnson was a much more skillful negotiator than Kennedy, but he had behind him a powerful national momentum demanding immediate action on moral and emotional grounds. Demands for immediate action originated from unexpected directions, especially white Protestant church groups. The Justice Department, led by Robert Kennedy, moved from a posture of defending him against the quagmire of racial politics to one of fulfilling his legacy. The violent death and public reaction dramatically moved the conservative Republicans, led by Senator Everett McKinley Dirksen, whose support was the margin of victory for the Civil Rights Act of 1964. The act immediately ended de jure (legal) segregation and the era of Jim Crow.

With the civil rights movement at full blast, Lyndon Johnson coupled black entrepreneurship with his war on poverty, establishing special programs within the Small Business Administration, the Office of Economic Opportunity, and other agencies. This time, there was money for loans designed to boost minority business ownership. Richard Nixon greatly expanded the program, setting up the Office of Minority Business Enterprise (OMBE) in the expectation that black entrepreneurs would help defuse racial tensions and possibly support his reelection.

=== Foreign political reactions ===
==== China ====
In China, Mao Zedong in August 1963 expressed support for the U.S. civil rights movement, stating that the "fascist atrocities" committed against black people in the U.S. demonstrated the link between reactionary domestic U.S. policies and its policies of aggression abroad. In 1968, a mass rally in China condemned the assassination of Martin Luther King Jr. Mao stated that racial discrimination in the U.S. resulted from its colonial system and that the struggle of Black people in the U.S. was an anti-imperialist struggle. The Chinese Communist Party echoed this view of the civil rights movement. During the Cultural Revolution, the People's Daily repeated cited the example that King advocated nonviolence, but was violently killed, as an example of its view that violent struggle was necessary for the oppressed masses of the world to free themselves.

Maoism influenced some components of the Black liberation movement, including the Black Panther Party and black self-defense advocate Robert F. Williams.

==== Soviet Union ====
There was an international context to the U.S. federal government's actions during these years. The Soviet media frequently covered racial discrimination in the U.S. Deeming American criticism of its own human rights abuses hypocritical, the Soviet government would respond by stating "And you are lynching Negroes". In his 1934 book Russia Today: What Can We Learn from It?, Sherwood Eddy wrote: "In the most remote villages of Russia today Americans are frequently asked what they are going to do to the Scottsboro Negro boys and why they lynch Negroes."

In Cold War Civil Rights: Race and the Image of American Democracy, the historian Mary L. Dudziak wrote that Communists who were critical of the United States accused it of practicing hypocrisy when it portrayed itself as the "leader of the free world," while so many of its citizens were being subjected to severe racial discrimination and violence; she argued that this was a major factor in moving the government to support civil rights legislation.

== Popular reactions ==
=== Malcolm X's relationship with the movement, 1964–1965 ===
In March 1964, Malcolm X (el-Hajj Malik el-Shabazz), national representative of the Nation of Islam, formally broke with that organization, and made a public offer to collaborate with any civil rights organization that accepted the right to self-defense and the philosophy of Black nationalism (which Malcolm said no longer required Black separatism). Gloria Richardson, head of the Cambridge, Maryland, chapter of SNCC, and leader of the Cambridge rebellion, an honored guest at The March on Washington, immediately embraced Malcolm's offer. Mrs. Richardson, "the nation's most prominent woman [civil rights] leader," told The Baltimore Afro-American that "Malcolm is being very practical. ... The federal government has moved into conflict situations only when matters approach the level of insurrection. Self-defense may force Washington to intervene sooner." Earlier, in May 1963, writer and activist James Baldwin had stated publicly that "the Black Muslim movement is the only one in the country we can call grassroots, I hate to say it. ... Malcolm articulates for Negroes, their suffering ... he corroborates their reality." On the local level, Malcolm and the NOI had been allied with the Harlem chapter of the Congress of Racial Equality (CORE) since at least 1962.

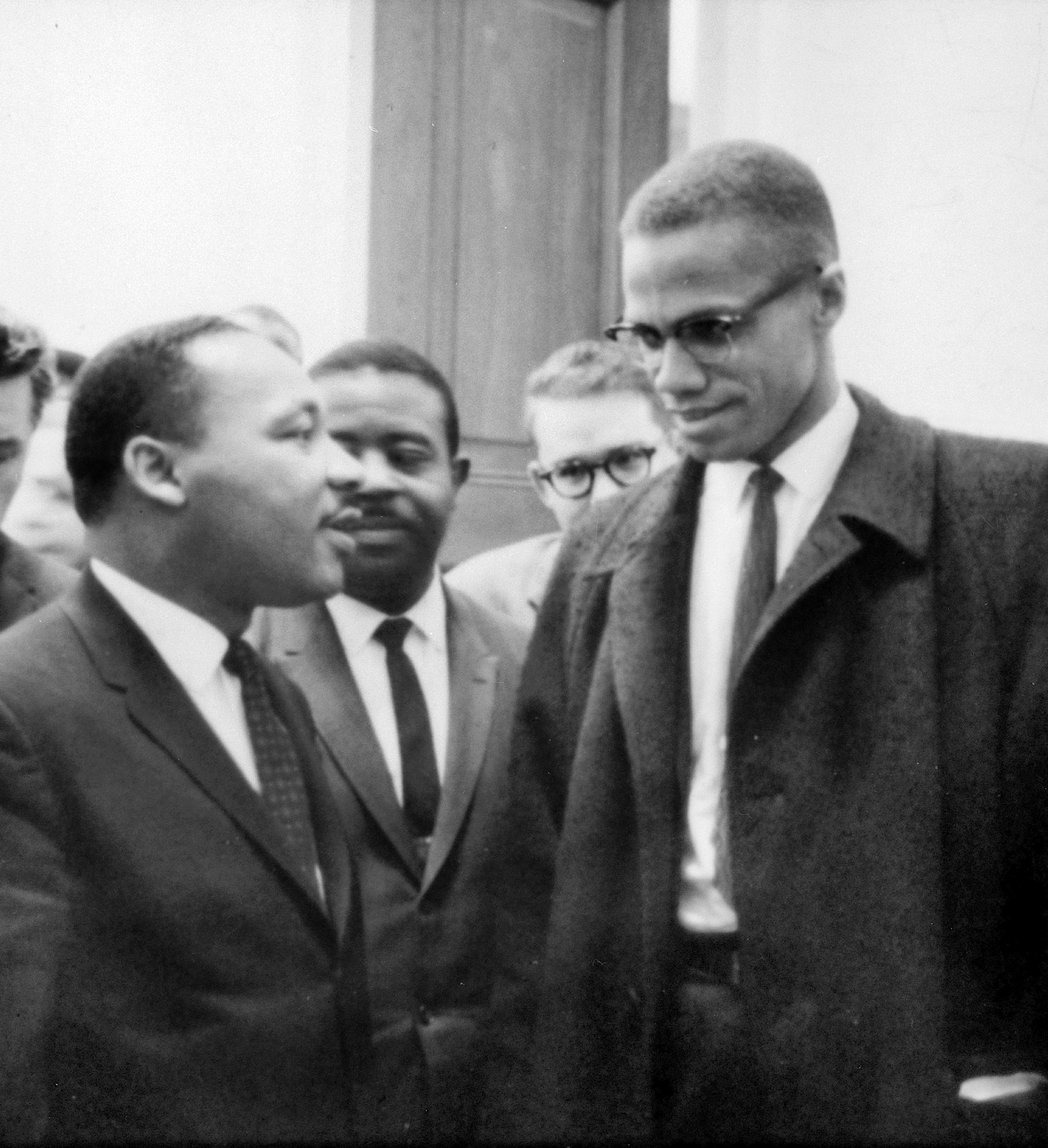
Malcolm X meets with Martin Luther King Jr., March 26, 1964

On March 26, 1964, as the Civil Rights Act faced stiff opposition in Congress, Malcolm held a public meeting with Martin Luther King Jr. at the Capitol. Malcolm had tried to begin a dialogue with King as early as 1957, but King had rebuffed him. Malcolm had responded by calling King an "Uncle Tom", saying he had turned his back on black militancy to appease the white power structure. But the two men were on good terms at their face-to-face meeting. There is evidence that King was preparing to support Malcolm's plan to formally bring the U.S. government before the United Nations on charges of human rights violations against African Americans. Malcolm now encouraged Black nationalists to get involved in voter registration drives and other forms of community organizing to redefine and expand the movement.

Civil rights activists became increasingly combative in the 1963 to 1964 period, seeking to defy such events as the thwarting of the Albany campaign, police repression, and Ku Klux Klan terrorism in Birmingham, and the assassination of Medgar Evers. The latter's brother Charles Evers, who took over as Mississippi NAACP Field Director, told a public NAACP conference on February 15, 1964, that "non-violence won't work in Mississippi ... we made up our minds ... that if a white man shoots at a Negro in Mississippi, we will shoot back." The repression of sit-ins in Jacksonville, Florida, provoked a riot in which black youth threw Molotov cocktails at police on March 24, 1964. Malcolm X gave numerous speeches in this period warning that such militant activity would escalate further if African Americans' rights were not fully recognized. In his landmark April 1964 speech "The Ballot or the Bullet", Malcolm presented an ultimatum to white America: "There's new strategy coming in. It'll be Molotov cocktails this month, hand grenades next month, and something else next month. It'll be ballots, or it'll be bullets."

As noted in the PBS documentary Eyes on the Prize, "Malcolm X had a far-reaching effect on the civil rights movement. In the South, there had been a long tradition of self-reliance. Malcolm X's ideas now touched that tradition". Self-reliance was becoming paramount in light of the 1964 Democratic National Convention's decision to refuse seating to the Mississippi Freedom Democratic Party (MFDP) and instead to seat the regular state delegation, which had been elected in violation of the party's own rules, and by Jim Crow law instead. SNCC moved in an increasingly militant direction and worked with Malcolm X on two Harlem MFDP fundraisers in December 1964.

When Fannie Lou Hamer spoke to Harlemites about the Jim Crow violence that she'd suffered in Mississippi, she linked it directly to the Northern police brutality against Black people that Malcolm protested against; When Malcolm asserted that African Americans should emulate the Mau Mau army of Kenya in efforts to gain their independence, many in SNCC applauded.

During the Selma campaign for voting rights in 1965, Malcolm made it known that he'd heard reports of increased threats of lynching around Selma. In late January he sent an open telegram to George Lincoln Rockwell, the head of the American Nazi Party, stating:

"if your present racist agitation against our people there in Alabama causes physical harm to Reverend King or any other black Americans ... you and your KKK friends will be met with maximum physical retaliation from those of us who are not handcuffed by the disarming philosophy of nonviolence."

The following month, the Selma chapter of SNCC invited Malcolm to speak to a mass meeting there. On the day of Malcolm's appearance, President Johnson made his first public statement in support of the Selma campaign. Paul Ryan Haygood, a co-director of the NAACP Legal Defense Fund, credits Malcolm with a role in gaining support from the federal government. Haygood noted that "shortly after Malcolm's visit to Selma, a federal judge, responding to a suit brought by the Department of Justice, required Dallas County, Alabama, registrars to process at least 100 Black applications each day their offices were open."

=== American Jewish People ===
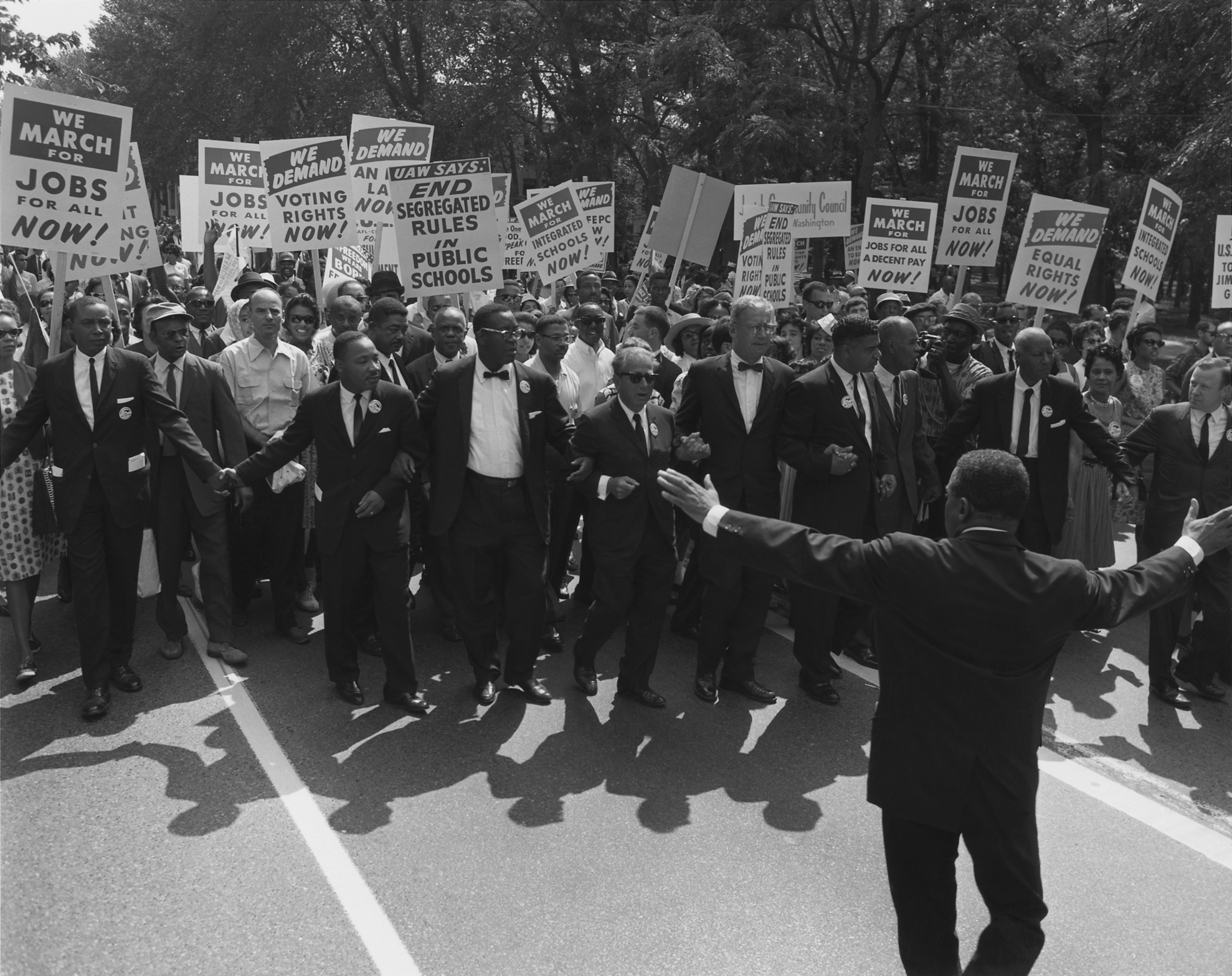
Jewish civil rights activist Joseph L. Rauh Jr. marching with Martin Luther King Jr. in 1963

Many in the Jewish community supported the civil rights movement. In fact, statistically, Jewish people were one of the most actively involved non-black groups in the Movement. Many Jewish students worked in concert with African Americans for CORE, SCLC, and SNCC as full-time organizers and summer volunteers during the Civil Rights era. Jewish people made up roughly half of the white northern and western volunteers involved in the 1964 Mississippi Freedom Summer project and approximately half of the civil rights attorneys active in the South during the 1960s.

Jewish leaders were arrested while heeding a call from Martin Luther King Jr. in St. Augustine, Florida, in June 1964, where the largest mass arrest of rabbis in American history took place at the Monson Motor Lodge. Abraham Joshua Heschel, a writer, rabbi, and professor of theology at the Jewish Theological Seminary of America in New York, was outspoken on the subject of civil rights. He marched arm-in-arm with King in the 1965 Selma to Montgomery march. In the 1964 murders of Chaney, Goodman, and Schwerner, the two white activists killed, Andrew Goodman and Michael Schwerner, were both Jewish.

Brandeis University, the only nonsectarian Jewish-sponsored college university in the world, created the Transitional Year Program (TYP) in 1968, in part response to the assassination of Martin Luther King Jr. The faculty created it to renew the university's commitment to social justice. Recognizing Brandeis as a university committed to academic excellence, these faculty members created an opportunity for disadvantaged students to participate in an empowering educational experience.

The American Jewish Committee, American Jewish Congress, and Anti-Defamation League (ADL) actively promoted civil rights. While Jewish people were very active in the civil rights movement in the South, in the North, many had experienced a more strained relationship with African Americans. It has been argued that with Black militancy and the Black Power movements on the rise, "Black antisemitism" increased, leading to strained relations between Black people and Jewish people in Northern communities. In New York City, most notably, there was a major socio-economic class difference in the perception of African Americans by Jewish people. Jewish people from better-educated upper-middle-class backgrounds were often very supportive of African American civil rights activities. In contrast, the Jewish people in poorer urban communities that became increasingly minority were often less supportive, largely due to more negative and violent interactions between the two groups.

According to political scientist Michael Rogin, Jewish-Black hostility was a two-way street extending to earlier decades. In the post-World War II era, Jewish people were granted white privilege, and most moved into the middle-class, while Black people were left behind in the ghetto. Urban Jewish people engaged in the same sort of conflicts with Black people—over integration busing, local control of schools, housing, crime, communal identity, and class divides—that other white ethnics did, leading to Jewish people participating in white flight. The culmination of this was the 1968 New York City teachers' strike, pitting largely Jewish schoolteachers against predominantly Black parents in Brownsville, New York.

Due to the prohibition against discrimination based on race, nationality, and religion, the Fair Housing Act of 1968 prohibited both antisemitic and anti-Black covenants from being enforced. The act was supported by many Jewish organizations.

==== Public profile ====
Many Jewish people in the Southern states who supported civil rights for African Americans tended to keep a low profile on "the race issue", to avoid attracting the attention of the anti-Black and antisemitic Ku Klux Klan. However, Klan groups exploited the issue of African-American integration and Jewish involvement in the struggle to commit violently antisemitic hate crimes. As an example of this hatred, in one year alone, from November 1957 to October 1958, temples and other Jewish communal gatherings were bombed and desecrated in Atlanta, Nashville, Jacksonville, and Miami, and dynamite was found under synagogues in Birmingham, Charlotte, and Gastonia, North Carolina. Some rabbis received death threats, but there were no injuries following these outbursts of violence.

=== Black segregationists ===
Despite the common notion that the ideas of Martin Luther King Jr., Malcolm X, and Black Power were in conflict with each other and constituted the only ideologies of the civil rights movement, many Black people held other views. Fearing that events during the movement were unfolding too quickly, some Black people felt that leaders should pursue their activism at an incremental pace. Others had reservations on how focused Black people were on the movement and felt that such attention was better spent on reforming issues within the black community.

While Conservatives, in general, supported integration, some defended incrementally phased-out segregation as a backstop against assimilation. Based on her interpretation of a 1966 study made by Donald Matthews and James Prothro detailing the relative percentage of Black people for integration, against it, or feeling something else, Lauren Winner asserts that:

Black defenders of segregation look, at first blush, very much like black nationalists, especially in their preference for all-black institutions; but black defenders of segregation differ from nationalists in two key ways. First, while both groups criticize NAACP-style integration, nationalists articulate a third alternative to integration and Jim Crow, while segregationists preferred to stick with the status quo. Second, absent from black defenders of segregation's political vocabulary was the demand for self-determination. They called for all-black institutions, but not autonomous all-black institutions; indeed, some defenders of segregation asserted that black people needed white paternalism and oversight in order to thrive.

Oftentimes, African-American community leaders would be staunch defenders of segregation. Church ministers, business people, and educators were among those who wished to keep segregation and segregationist ideals to retain the privileges they gained from patronage from whites, such as monetary gains. In addition, they relied on segregation to keep their jobs and economies in their communities thriving. It was feared that if integration became widespread in the South, black-owned businesses and other establishments would lose a large chunk of their customer base to white-owned businesses, and many Black people would lose opportunities for jobs that were presently exclusive to their interests. On the other hand, there were the everyday, average black people who criticized integration as well. They took issue with various aspects of the civil rights movement and with the potential for Black people to exercise consumerism and economic liberty without hindrance from white people.

For Martin Luther King Jr., Malcolm X, and other leading activists and groups during the movement, these opposing viewpoints posed obstacles to their ideas. These different views made these leaders' work much harder, but they were nonetheless important to the movement's overall scope. For the most part, the Black individuals who had reservations about various aspects of the movement and the activists' ideologies were not able to make a game-changing dent in the activists' efforts. Still, the existence of these alternative ideas gave some Black people an outlet to express their concerns about the changing social structure.

=== "Black Power" militants ===
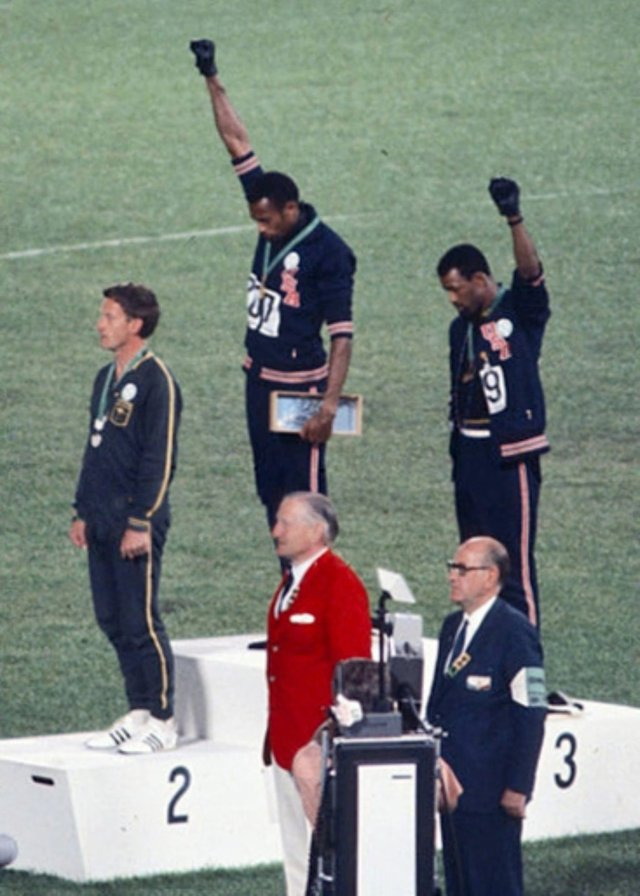
Gold medalist Tommie Smith (center) and bronze medalist John Carlos (right) showing the raised fist on the podium after the 200 m race at the 1968 Summer Olympics; both wear Olympic Project for Human Rights badges. Peter Norman (silver medalist, left) from Australia also wears an OPHR badge in solidarity with Smith and Carlos.

During the Freedom Summer campaign of 1964, numerous tensions within the civil rights movement came to the forefront. Many Black people in SNCC developed concerns that white activists from the North and West were taking over the movement. The participation by numerous white students did not reduce the amount of violence that SNCC suffered but seemed to exacerbate it. Additionally, there was profound disillusionment at Lyndon Johnson's denial of voting status for the Mississippi Freedom Democratic Party at the Democratic National Convention. Meanwhile, during CORE's work in Louisiana that summer, that group found the federal government would not respond to requests to enforce the provisions of the Civil Rights Act of 1964, or to protect the lives of activists who challenged segregation. The Louisiana campaign survived by relying on a local African-American militia called the Deacons for Defense and Justice, who used arms to repel white supremacist violence and police repression. CORE's collaboration with the Deacons was effective in disrupting Jim Crow in numerous Louisiana areas.

In 1965, SNCC helped organize an independent political party, the Lowndes County Freedom Organization (LCFO), in the heart of the Alabama Black Belt, also Klan territory. It permitted its black leaders to openly promote the use of armed self-defense. Meanwhile, the Deacons for Defense and Justice expanded into Mississippi and assisted Charles Evers's NAACP chapter with a successful campaign in Natchez. Charles had taken the lead after his brother Medgar Evers was assassinated in 1963. The same year, the 1965 Watts Rebellion took place in Los Angeles. Many black youths were committed to the use of violence to protest inequality and oppression.

During the March Against Fear in 1966, initiated by James Meredith, SNCC and CORE fully embraced the slogan of "black power" to describe these trends towards militancy and self-reliance. In Mississippi, Stokely Carmichael declared, "I'm not going to beg the white man for anything that I deserve, I'm going to take it. We need power."

Some people engaging in the Black Power movement claimed a growing sense of black pride and identity. In gaining more of a sense of a cultural identity, Black people demanded that whites no longer refer to them as "Negroes" but as "Afro-Americans," similar to other ethnic groups, such as Irish Americans and Italian Americans. Until the mid-1960s, Black people had dressed similarly to whites and often straightened their hair. As part of affirming their identity, Black people began wearing African-based dashikis and growing their hair out in natural afros. The afro, sometimes nicknamed the "'fro," remained a popular black hairstyle until the late 1970s. Other variations of traditional African styles have become popular, often featuring braids, extensions, and dreadlocks.

The Black Panther Party (BPP), founded by Huey Newton and Bobby Seale in Oakland, California in 1966, gained the most national attention for its Black Power activism. The group began following the revolutionary pan-Africanism of late-period Malcolm X, using a "by-any-means necessary" approach to stopping racial inequality. They sought to rid African-American neighborhoods of police brutality and to establish socialist community control in the ghettos. While they conducted armed confrontations with the police, they also set up free breakfast and healthcare programs for children. Between 1968 and 1971, the BPP was one of the most important black organizations in the country and had support from the NAACP, SCLC, Peace and Freedom Party, and others.

Black Power was taken to another level inside prison walls. In 1966, George Jackson formed the Black Guerrilla Family in the California San Quentin State Prison. The goal of this group was to overthrow the white-run government in America and the prison system. In 1970, this group displayed their dedication after a white correctional officer was found not guilty of shooting and killing three black prisoners from the prison tower. They retaliated by killing a white correctional officer.

"Say It Loud – I'm Black and I'm Proud"
James Brown's "Say It Loud – I'm Black and I'm Proud" (1968)

Numerous popular cultural expressions associated with black power appeared at this time. Released in August 1968, the number one Rhythm & Blues single for the Billboard Year-End list was James Brown's "Say It Loud – I'm Black and I'm Proud". In October 1968, Tommie Smith and John Carlos, while being awarded the gold and bronze medals, respectively, at the 1968 Summer Olympics, donned human rights badges; each raised a black-gloved Black Power salute during their podium ceremony.

King was not comfortable with the "Black Power" slogan, which sounded too much like black nationalism to him. When King was assassinated in 1968, Stokely Carmichael said that whites had murdered the one person who would prevent rampant rioting and that Black people would burn every major city to the ground. Riots broke out in more than 100 cities across the country. Some cities did not recover from the damage for more than a generation; other neighborhoods in those cities never recovered.

=== Native Americans ===
King and the civil rights movement inspired the Native American rights movement of the 1960s, as well as many of its leaders. Native Americans had been dehumanized as "merciless Indian savages" in the United States Declaration of Independence, and in King's 1964 book Why We Can't Wait he wrote: "Our nation was born in genocide when it embraced the doctrine that the original American, the Indian, was an inferior race". This view of the Natives appeared in statues which stood outside the U.S. Capitol for over a century: 1844's The Discovery of America which depicted a triumphant Columbus and a "female savage", and 1837's The Rescue which conveyed "the triumph of the whites over the savage tribes". King would write the U.S. is

"perhaps the only nation which tried as a matter of national policy to wipe out its indigenous population. Moreover, we elevated that tragic experience into a noble crusade. Indeed, even today we have not permitted ourselves to reject or to feel remorse for this shameful episode. Our literature, our films, our drama, our folklore all exalt it."

John Echohawk, a member of the Pawnee tribe and the executive director and one of the founders of the Native American Rights Fund, stated: "Inspired by Dr. King, who was advancing the civil rights agenda of equality under the laws of this country, we thought that we could also use the laws to advance our Indianship, to live as tribes in our territories governed by our own laws under the principles of tribal sovereignty that had been with us ever since 1831. We believed that we could fight for a policy of self-determination that was consistent with U.S. law and that we could govern our own affairs, define our own ways and continue to survive in this society". Native Americans were also active supporters of King's movement throughout the 1960s, which included a sizable Native American contingent at the 1963 March on Washington for Jobs and Freedom.

=== Northern Ireland ===
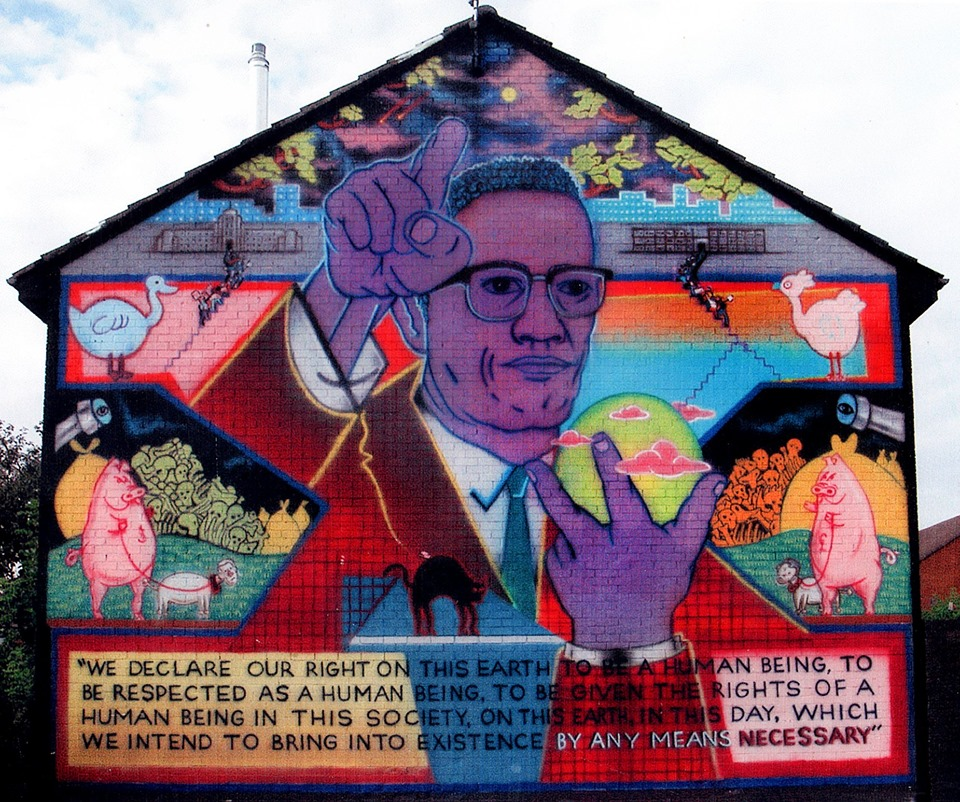
Mural of Malcolm X in Belfast

Due to policies of segregation and disenfranchisement present in Northern Ireland, many Irish activists took inspiration from American civil rights activists. People's Democracy had organized a "Long March" from Belfast to Derry which was inspired by the Selma to Montgomery marches. During the civil rights movement in Northern Ireland protesters often sang the American protest song We Shall Overcome and sometimes referred to themselves as the "negroes of Northern Ireland".

=== White "status quo" Southerners ===
A majority of White Southerners have been estimated to have been opposed to the civil rights movement and racial equality, though most did not engage in violence or join the Klan. Many did not enjoy the idea of expanding civil rights but were uncomfortable with the language and often violent tactics used by those who resisted the civil rights movement as part of the Massive resistance. Many only reacted to the movement once forced to by their changing environment, and when they did, their response was usually whatever they felt would disturb their daily life the least. Most of their personal reactions, whether eventually in support or resistance, were not extreme.

=== White segregationists ===
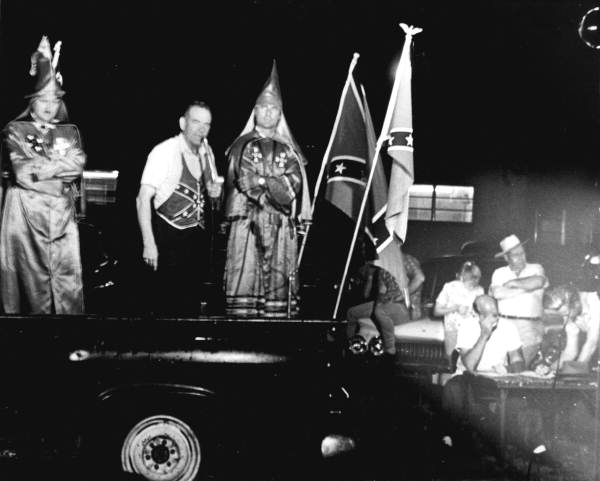
Ku Klux Klan demonstration in St. Augustine, Florida in 1964

King reached the height of his popularity in 1964, when he was awarded the Nobel Peace Prize. After that point, his career was filled with frustrating challenges. The liberal coalition that had gained passage of the Civil Rights Act of 1964 and the Voting Rights Act of 1965 began to fray.

King was becoming more estranged from the Johnson administration. In 1965, he broke with it by calling for peace negotiations and a halt to the bombing of Vietnam. He moved further left in the following years, speaking about the need for economic justice and thoroughgoing changes in American society. He believed that change was needed beyond the civil rights movement that had been gained.

However, King's attempts to broaden the scope of the civil rights movement were halting and largely unsuccessful. In 1965, King and James Bevel took the Movement north to address housing discrimination in Chicago. The SCLC's Chicago campaign publicly failed because Chicago's Mayor Richard J. Daley marginalized it by promising to "study" the city's problems. In 1966, after the Chicago open housing movement had ended, white demonstrators in notoriously racist Cicero, a suburb of Chicago, held "white power" signs and threw stones at marchers who were still demonstrating against housing segregation.

Politicians and journalists quickly blamed this white backlash on the movement's shift towards Black Power in the mid-1960s; today most scholars believe the backlash was a phenomenon that was already developing in the mid-1950s, and it was embodied in the "massive resistance" movement in the South where even the few moderate white leaders (including George Wallace, who had once been endorsed by the NAACP) shifted to openly racist positions. Northern and Western racists opposed the southerners on a regional and cultural basis, but also held segregationist attitudes which became more pronounced as the civil rights movement headed north and west. For instance, before the Watts riot, California whites had already mobilized to repeal the state's 1963 fair housing law.

Even so, the backlash at the time was unable to roll back the major civil rights victories achieved or swing the country into a reaction. Social historians Matthew Lassiter and Barbara Ehrenreich note that the backlash's primary constituency was suburban and middle-class, not working-class whites: "among the white electorate, one half of blue-collar voters ... cast their ballot for [the liberal presidential candidate] Hubert Humphrey in 1968 ... only in the South did George Wallace draw substantially more blue-collar than white-collar support."

== In popular culture ==
The 1954 to 1968 civil rights movement contributed strong cultural threads to American and international theater, song, film, television, and art.

== Activist organizations ==
=== National/regional civil rights organizations ===
- Congress of Racial Equality (CORE)
- Deacons for Defense and Justice
- Leadership Conference on Civil Rights (LCCR)
- Medical Committee for Human Rights (MCHR)
- National Association for the Advancement of Colored People (NAACP)
- National Council of Negro Women (NCNW)
- Organization of Afro-American Unity (OAAU)
- Southern Christian Leadership Conference (SCLC)
- Student Nonviolent Coordinating Committee (SNCC)
- Southern Conference Educational Fund (SCEF)
- Southern Student Organizing Committee (SSOC)
- American Council on Civil Rights (ACCR)

=== National economic empowerment organizations ===
- Operation Breadbasket
- Urban League

=== Local civil rights organizations ===
- Albany Movement (Albany, Georgia)
- Council of Federated Organizations (Mississippi)
- Montgomery Improvement Association (Montgomery, Alabama)
- Nashville Student Movement (Nashville, Tennessee)
- Regional Council of Negro Leadership (Mississippi)
- Women's Political Council (Montgomery, Alabama)

== Individual activists ==
- Ralph Abernathy
- Victoria Gray Adams
- Muhammad Ali
- Maya Angelou
- Louis Austin
- Ella Baker
- James Baldwin
- Marion Barry
- Daisy Bates
- Harry Belafonte
- Fay Bellamy Powell
- James Bevel
- Claude Black
- Unita Blackwell
- Julian Bond
- Anne Braden
- Carl Braden
- Stanley Branche
- Ralph Bunche
- Mary Fair Burks
- Stokely Carmichael
- James Chaney
- Shirley Chisholm
- Septima Poinsette Clark
- Xernona Clayton
- Albert Cleage
- Eldridge Cleaver
- Charles E. Cobb Jr.
- John Conyers
- Sam Cooke
- Annie Lee Cooper
- Dorothy Cotton
- Claudette Colvin
- Jonathan Daniels
- Ossie Davis
- Ruby Dee
- Annie Devine
- Doris Derby
- Marian Wright Edelman
- Medgar Evers
- James L. Farmer Jr.
- Walter E. Fauntroy
- Karl Fleming
- Sarah Mae Flemming
- James Forman
- Frankie Muse Freeman
- Georgia Gilmore
- Andrew Goodman
- Fred Gray
- Jack Greenberg
- Dick Gregory
- Prathia Hall
- Fannie Lou Hamer
- Lorraine Hansberry
- Robert Hayling
- Dorothy Height
- Lola Hendricks
- Aaron Henry
- Libby Holman
- Myles Horton
- T. R. M. Howard
- Winson Hudson
- Jesse Jackson
- Jimmie Lee Jackson
- Mahalia Jackson
- Esau Jenkins
- Clarence B. Jones
- Barbara Jordan
- Vernon Jordan
- Clyde Kennard
- Coretta Scott King
- Martin Luther King Jr.
- Bernard Lafayette
- James Lawson
- Bernard Lee
- John Lewis
- Stanley Levison
- Viola Liuzzo
- Audre Lorde
- Joseph Lowery
- Autherine Lucy
- Clara Luper
- Thurgood Marshall
- Benjamin Mays
- Franklin McCain
- Floyd McKissick
- James Meredith
- Loren Miller
- Jack Minnis
- Anne Moody
- Harry T. Moore
- E. Frederic Morrow
- Bob Moses
- Bill Moyer
- Elijah Muhammad
- Diane Nash
- Denise Nicholas
- E. D. Nixon
- David Nolan
- James Orange
- Nan Grogan Orrock
- Rosa Parks
- Rutledge Pearson
- Adam Clayton Powell Jr.
- Gloria Johnson-Powell
- A. Philip Randolph
- George Raymond
- George Raymond Jr.
- James Reeb
- Frederick D. Reese
- Walter Reuther
- Gloria Richardson
- David Richmond
- Paul Robeson
- Amelia Boynton Robinson
- Jackie Robinson
- Jo Ann Robinson
- Ruby Doris Smith-Robinson
- Bayard Rustin
- Michael Schwerner
- Cleveland Sellers
- Charles Sherrod
- Fred Shuttlesworth
- Modjeska Monteith Simkins
- Nina Simone
- Charles Kenzie Steele
- Annie Stein
- Dempsey Travis
- C. T. Vivian
- Wyatt Tee Walker
- Roy Wilkins
- Hosea Williams
- Robert F. Williams
- Andrew Young
- Whitney Young

== See also ==
- African-American Jeremiad
- American Indian Movement
- Asian American movement
- Chicano Movement
- Civil rights movement (1865–1896)
- Civil rights movement (1896–1954)
- History of civil rights in the United States
- Lay that Trumpet in Our Hands—2002 novel
- List of civil rights leaders
- List of Kentucky women in the civil rights era
- List of photographers of the civil rights movement
- South Carolina in the civil rights movement
- Timeline of the civil rights movement
- "We Shall Overcome", the unofficial anthem of the movement

=== History preservation ===
- Birmingham Civil Rights National Monument
- Civil Rights Movement Archive
- Freedom Riders National Monument
- Read's Drug Store (Baltimore), the site of a 1955 desegregation sit-in
- Seattle Civil Rights and Labor History Project
- Television News of the Civil Rights Era 1950–1970

=== Post–civil rights movement ===
- Black Lives Matter
- Post–civil rights era in African-American history

== Bibliography ==
- Arsenault, Raymond (2006). Freedom Riders: 1961 and the Struggle for Racial Justice. Oxford Press.
- Back, Adina "Exposing the Whole Segregation Myth: The Harlem Nine and New York City Schools" in Freedom north: Black freedom struggles outside the South, 1940–1980, Jeanne Theoharis, Komozi Woodard, eds. (Palgrave Macmillan, 2003).
- Bartley, Abel A. Keeping the Faith: Race, Politics and Social Development in Jacksonville, 1940–1970 (Greenwood Publishing Group, 2000)
- Bass, S. Jonathan (2001) Blessed Are The Peacemakers: Martin Luther King Jr., Eight White Religious Leaders, and the "Letter from Birmingham Jail". Baton Rouge: LSU Press. ISBN 0-8071-2655-1
- Beito, David T. and Beito, Linda Royster, Black Maverick: T.R.M. Howard's Fight for Civil Rights and Economic Power, University of Illinois Press, 2009. ISBN 978-0-252-03420-6
- Branch, Taylor. Parting the waters: America in the King years, 1954–1963. New York: Simon & Schuster, 1988
- Breitman, George ed. Malcolm X Speaks: Selected Speeches and Statements (Grove Press, 1965)
- Brown, Jennie Medgar Evers, Holloway House Publishing, 1994
- Bryant, Nicholas Andrew The Bystander: John F. Kennedy And the Struggle for Black Equality (Basic Books, 2006)
- Cannato, Vincent. "The Ungovernable City: John Lindsay and his struggle to save New York". Better Books, 2001. ISBN 0-465-00843-7
- Carson, Clayborne (1981). In Struggle: SNCC and the Black Awakening of the 1960s. Cambridge: Harvard University Press. ISBN 978-0-674-44727-1.
- Chafe, William Henry (1980). Civilities and civil rights: Greensboro, North Carolina, and the Black struggle for freedom. New York: Oxford University Press. ISBN 978-0-19-502625-2.
- Chafe, William Henry (2003). The Unfinished Journey: America since World War II. Oxford University Press. ISBN 978-0-19-515049-0.
- Cleaver, Eldridge (1967). Soul on Ice. New York: McGraw-Hill.
- Crump, Spencer Black riot in Los Angeles: the story of the Watts tragedy (1966)
- Davis, Mike; Wiener, Jon (2020). Set the Night on Fire: L.A. in the Sixties. New York: Verso Books.
- Davis, Townsend (1998). Weary Feet, Rested Souls: A Guided History of the Civil Rights Movement. New York: W. W. Norton & Company. ISBN 978-0-393-04592-5.
- Dudziak, M.L.: Cold War Civil Rights: Race and the Image of American Democracy
- Erikson, Erik (1969). Gandhi's Truth: On the Origins of Militant Nonviolence. New York: Norton. ISBN 978-0-393-31034-4.
- Eskew, Glenn T. But for Birmingham: The Local and National Struggles in the Civil Rights Movement (University of North Carolina Press, 1997)
- Fine, Sidney Expanding the Frontier of Civil Rights: Michigan, 1948–1968 (Wayne State University Press, 2000)
- Finkelman, Paul, ed. (2009). Encyclopedia of African American History. Oxford University Press. ISBN 978-0-19-516779-5.
- Forman, James (1972). The Making of Black Revolutionaries. New York: Macmillan. ISBN 978-0-940880-10-8.
- Friedman, Michael Jay (2008). Free at Last: The U. S. Civil Rights Movement (PDF). U.S. Department of State.
- Garrow, David J. Bearing the Cross: Martin Luther King Jr. and the Southern Christian Leadership Conference (HarperCollins, 1987)
- Gershenhorn, Jerry (2018). Louis Austin and The Carolina Times: A Life in the Long Black Freedom Struggle. Chapel Hill, NC: University of North Carolina Press.
- Goluboff, Risa L. The Lost Promise of Civil Rights, Harvard University Press, MA: Cambridge, 2007.
- Gregg, Khyree. A Concise Chronicle History of the African-American People Experience in America. Henry Epps.
- Hague, Euan; Sebesta, Edward H.; Beirich, Heidi (2008). Neo-Confederacy: A Critical Introduction. University of Texas Press. ISBN 978-0-292-71837-1.
- Hill, Lance The Deacons for Defense: Armed Resistance and the Civil Rights Movement (University of North Carolina Press, 2006)
- Hilty, James (2000). Robert Kennedy: Brother Protector. Temple University Press. ISBN 978-1-4399-0519-7.
- Hoose, Phillip (2009). Claudette Colvin: Twice Toward Justice. New York: Melanie Kroupa Books/Farrar Straus Giroux. ISBN 978-0-312-66105-2.
- Houston, Benjamin (2012). The Nashville Way: Racial Etiquette and the Struggle for Social Justice in a Southern City. Athens: University of Georgia Press. ISBN 978-0-8203-4326-6.
- Jackson, Thomas F. (July 17, 2013). From Civil Rights to Human Rights. Philadelphia: University of Pennsylvania Press. ISBN 978-0-8122-0000-3.
- Klarman, Michael J., Brown v. Board of Education and the Civil Rights Movement [electronic resource] : abridged edition of From Jim Crow to Civil Rights: The Supreme Court and the Struggle for Racial Equality, Oxford; New York : Oxford University Press, 2007.
- Levy, Peter B. "The Dream Deferred: The Assassination of Martin Luther King Jr., and the Holy Week Uprisings of 1968" in Baltimore '68 : Riots and Rebirth in an American city (Temple University Press, 2011)
- Lewis, John (1998). Walking With the Wind. Simon & Schuster. ISBN 978-0-684-81065-2.
- Locke, Hubert G. The Detroit riot of 1967 (Wayne State University Press, 1969)
- Logan, Rayford, The Betrayal of the Negro from Rutherford B. Hayes to Woodrow Wilson. New York: Da Capo Press, 1997.
- McAdam, Doug (1988). Freedom Summer. Oxford University Press. ISBN 978-0-19-504367-9.
- Marable, Manning Malcolm X: A Life of Reinvention (Penguin Books, 2011)
- Matusow, Allen J. "From Civil Rights to Black Power: The Case of SNCC" in Twentieth Century America: Recent Interpretations (Harcourt Press, 1972)
- Pinkney, Alphnso and Woock, Roger Poverty and Politics in Harlem, College & University Press Services, Inc., 1970
- Piven, Francis Fox and Cloward, Richard Regulating the Poor (Random House 1971)
- Piven, Francis Fox and Cloward, Richard Poor People's Movements: How They Succeed, How They Fail (Random House, 1977)
- Ransby, Barbara Ella Baker and the Black Freedom Movement: A Radical Democratic Vision (University of North Carolina Press, 2003).
- Reeves, Richard (1993). President Kennedy: Profile of Power. New York: Simon & Schuster. ISBN 978-0-671-64879-4.
- Robinson, Jo Ann & Garrow, David J. (foreword by Coretta Scott King) The Montgomery Bus Boycott and the Women Who Started It (1986) ISBN 0-394-75623-1 Knoxville, University of Tennessee Press.
- Rosenberg, Jonathan; Karabell, Zachary (2003). Kennedy, Johnson, and the Quest for Justice: The Civil Rights Tapes. WW Norton & Co. ISBN 978-0-393-05122-3.
- Saito, Leland T. (1998). Race and Politics: Asian Americans, Latinos, and Whites in a Los Angeles Suburb. University of Illinois Press.
- Schultz, Jeffrey D. (2002). Encyclopedia of Minorities in American Politics: African Americans and Asian Americans. Oryx Press. ISBN 978-1-57356-148-8.
- Schlesinger, Arthur M. Jr. (2002) [1978]. Robert Kennedy and His Times. Houghton Mifflin Books. ISBN 978-0-618-21928-5.
- Schoen, Douglas (2015). The Nixon Effect: How His Presidency Has Changed American Politics. Encounter Books. ISBN 978-1-59403-800-6.
- Self, Robert O. (2005). American Babylon: Race and the Struggle for Postwar Oakland. Princeton University Press. ISBN 978-1-4008-4417-3.
- Smith, Jean Edward (2001). Grant. Simon and Schuster. p. 544. ISBN 978-0-7432-1701-9.
- Stephens, Otis H. Jr.; Scheb, John M. II (2007). American Constitutional Law: Civil Rights and Liberties. Cengage Learning. ISBN 978-0-495-09705-1.
- Strain, Christopher Pure Fire:Self-Defense as Activism in the Civil Rights Era (University of Georgia Press, 2005)
- Sugrue, Thomas J. Sweet Land of Liberty: The Forgotten Struggle for Civil Rights in the North (2008). 720pp comprehensive history of civil rights issue in the North, 1930s–2000s online
- Sugrue, Thomas J. The origins of the urban crisis : race and inequality in postwar Detroit (2014) online
- Tucker, William H. The Funding of Scientific Racism: Wickliffe Draper and the Pioneer Fund, University of Illinois Press (2007)
- Tyson, Timothy B. Radio Free Dixie: Robert F. Williams and the Roots of 'Black Power' (University of North Carolina Press, 1999)
- Umoja, Akinyele We Will Shoot Back: Armed Resistance in the Mississippi Freedom Movement (NYU Press, 2013)
- Weems, Robert E. Jr., Business in Black and White: American Presidents and Black Entrepreneurs (2009)
- Weiner, Melissa F. (2010). Power, Protest, and the Public Schools: Jewish and African American Struggles in New York City. Rutgers University Press. ISBN 978-0-8135-4772-5.
- Wendt, Simon. The Spirit and the Shotgun: Armed Resistance and the Struggle for Civil Rights. (University of Florida Press, 2007).
- Williams, Juan. Eyes on the Prize: America's Civil Rights Years, 1954–1965. Penguin Books, 1987. ISBN 0-14-009653-1.
- Winner, Lauren F. "Doubtless Sincere: New Characters in the Civil Rights Cast." In The Role of Ideas in the Civil Rights South, edited by Ted Ownby. Jackson: University Press of Mississippi, 2002
- Woodward, C. Vann The Strange Career of Jim Crow, 3rd rev. ed. (Oxford University Press, 1974).
- Young, Coleman Hard Stuff: The Autobiography of Mayor Coleman Young (1994)
- Zarefsky, David President Johnson's war on poverty: Rhetoric and history (2005)

=== Further reading ===
- Abel, Elizabeth. Signs of the Times: The Visual Politics of Jim Crow. (U of California Press, 2010).
- Bader, Michael D.M., and Siri Warkentien. "The fragmented evolution of racial integration since the civil rights movement." Sociological Science 3 (2016): 135–166. online
- Barnes, Catherine A. Journey from Jim Crow: The Desegregation of Southern Transit (Columbia UP, 1983).
- Bennett, Lerone Jr. (1965). Confrontation Black and White. Chicago: Johnson Publishing Company, Inc.
- Bloom, Jack M. Class, race, and the civil rights movement (Indiana University Press, 2019).
- Branch, Taylor. Pillar of fire: America in the King years, 1963–1965. (1998)
- Branch, Taylor. At Canaan's Edge: America In the King Years, 1965–1968. New York: Simon & Schuster, 2006. ISBN 0-684-85712-X
- Chandra, Siddharth, and Angela Williams-Foster. "The 'Revolution of Rising Expectations,' Relative Deprivation, and the Urban Social Disorders of the 1960s: Evidence from State-Level Data." Social Science History, (2005) 29#2 pp:299–332, in JSTOR
- Cox, Julian. Road to Freedom: Photographs of the Civil Rights Movement, 1956–1968, Atlanta: High Museum of Art, 2008.
- Eig, Jonathan. King: A Life (Farrar, Straus and Giroux, 2023) won the Pulitzer Prize.
- Ellis, Sylvia. Freedom's Pragmatist: Lyndon Johnson and Civil Rights (U Press of Florida, 2013).
- Fairclough, Adam. To Redeem the Soul of America: The Southern Christian Leadership Conference & Martin Luther King. The University of Georgia Press, 1987.
- Faulkenbury, Evan. Poll Power: The Voter Education Project and the Movement for the Ballot in the American South. Chapel Hill: The University of North Carolina Press, 2019.
- Garrow, David J. The FBI and Martin Luther King. New York: W.W. Norton. 1981. Viking Press Reprint edition. 1983. ISBN 0-14-006486-9. Yale University Press; Revised and Expanded edition. 2006. ISBN 0-300-08731-4.
- Greene, Christina. Our Separate Ways: Women and the Black Freedom Movement in Durham. North Carolina. Chapel Hill: University of North Carolina Press, 2005.
- Hine, Darlene Clark, ed. Black Women in America (3 Vol. 2nd ed. 2005; several multivolume editions). Short biographies by scholars.
- Horne, Gerald. The Fire This Time: The Watts Uprising and the 1960s. Charlottesville: University Press of Virginia. 1995. Da Capo Press; 1st Da Capo Press ed. 1997. ISBN 0-306-80792-0
- Jones, Jacqueline. Labor of love, labor of sorrow: Black women, work, and the family, from slavery to the present (2009).
- Kasher, Steven. The Civil Rights Movement: A Photographic History, New York: Abbeville Press, 1996.
- Keppel, Ben. Brown v. Board and the Transformation of American Culture (LSU Press, 2016). xiv, 225 pp.
- Kirk, John A. Redefining the Color Line: Black Activism in Little Rock, Arkansas, 1940–1970. Gainesville: University of Florida Press, 2002. ISBN 0-8130-2496-X
- Kirk, John A. Martin Luther King Jr. London: Longman, 2005. ISBN 0-582-41431-8.
- Kousser, J. Morgan (April 2000). "The Supreme Court And The Undoing of the Second Reconstruction". National Forum. Archived from the original on October 14, 2007 – via FindArticles.
- Kryn, Randall L. "James L. Bevel, The Strategist of the 1960s Civil Rights Movement", 1984 paper with 1988 addendum, printed in We Shall Overcome, Volume II edited by David Garrow, New York: Carlson Publishing Co., 1989.
- Levy, Peter B. The Civil Rights Movement: A Reference Guide (ABC-CLIO, 2019).
- Lowery, Charles D. Encyclopedia of African-American civil rights: from emancipation to the present (Greenwood, 1992).
- Marable, Manning. Race, Reform and Rebellion: The Second Reconstruction in Black America, 1945–1982. 249 pages. University Press of Mississippi, 1984. ISBN 0-87805-225-9.
- McAdam, Doug. Political Process and the Development of Black Insurgency, 1930–1970, Chicago: University of Chicago Press. 1982.
- McAdam, Doug, 'The US Civil Rights Movement: Power from Below and Above, 1945–70', in Adam Roberts and Timothy Garton Ash (eds.), Civil Resistance and Power Politics: The Experience of Non-violent Action from Gandhi to the Present. Oxford & New York: Oxford University Press, 2009. ISBN 978-0-19-955201-6.
- Minchin, Timothy J. Hiring the Black Worker: The Racial Integration of the Southern Textile Industry, 1960–1980. University of North Carolina Press, 1999. ISBN 0-8078-2470-4.
- Morris, Aldon D. The Origins of the Civil Rights Movement: Black Communities Organizing for Change. New York: The Free Press, 1984. ISBN 0-02-922130-7
- Ogletree, Charles J. Jr. (2004). All Deliberate Speed: Reflections on the First Half Century of Brown v. Board of Education. New York: W.W. Norton. ISBN 978-0-393-05897-0.
- Payne, Charles M. I've Got the Light of Freedom: The Organizing Tradition and the Mississippi Freedom Struggle. U of California Press, 1995.
- Patterson, James T. Brown v. Board of Education : a civil rights milestone and its troubled legacy. Oxford University Press, 2002. ISBN 0-19-515632-3.
- Raffel, Jeffrey. Historical dictionary of school segregation and desegregation: The American experience (Bloomsbury, 1998) online
- Raiford, Leigh. Imprisoned in a Luminous Glare: Photography and the African American Freedom Struggle Archived August 22, 2016, at the Wayback Machine. (U of North Carolina Press, 2011).
- Reed, Thomas Vernon. The art of protest: Culture and activism from the Civil Rights Movement to the present (U of Minnesota Press, 2019).
- Richardson, Christopher M.; Ralph E. Luker, eds. (2014). Historical Dictionary of the Civil Rights Movement (2nd ed.). Rowman & Littlefield. ISBN 978-0-8108-8037-5.
- Riches, William. The civil rights movement: Struggle and resistance (Bloomsbury Publishing, 2017), short survey
- Sitkoff, Howard. The Struggle for Black Equality (2nd ed. 2008)
- Smith, Jessie Carney, ed. Encyclopedia of African American Business (2 vol. Greenwood, 2006). excerpt
- Sokol, Jason. There Goes My Everything: White Southerners in the Age of Civil Rights, 1945–1975. (Knopf, 2006).
- Tsesis, Alexander. We Shall Overcome: A History of Civil Rights and the Law. (Yale University Press, 2008). ISBN 978-0-300-11837-7
- Tuck, Stephen. We Ain't What We Ought to Be: The Black Freedom Struggle from Emancipation to Obama (2011).

=== Historiography and memory ===
- Armstrong, Julie Buckner, ed. (2015). The Cambridge Companion to American Civil Rights Literature. Cambridge University Press. pp. xxiv, 209. ISBN 978-1-316-24038-0.
- Berger, Martin A. Seeing through Race: A Reinterpretation of Civil Rights Photography. Berkeley: University of California Press, 2011.
- Berger, Maurice. For All the World to See: Visual Culture and the Struggle for Civil Rights. New Haven and London: Yale University Press, 2010.
- Carawan, Candie. Sing for freedom: The story of the civil rights movement through its songs (NewSouth Books, 2021).
- Catsam, Derek (January 2008). "The Civil Rights Movement and the Presidency in the Hot Years of the Cold War: A Historical and Historiographical Assessment". History Compass. 6 (1): 314–344. doi:10.1111/j.1478-0542.2007.00486.x.
- Cha-Jua, Sundiata Keita; Lang, Clarence (Spring 2007). "The 'Long Movement' as Vampire: Temporal and Spatial Fallacies in Recent Black Freedom Studies". The Journal of African American History. 92 (2): 265–288. doi:10.1086/JAAHv92n2p265. S2CID 140436349.
- Clayton, Dewey M. "Black Lives Matter and the civil rights movement: A comparative analysis of two social movements in the United States." Journal of Black Studies 49.5 (2018): 448–480.
- Eagles, Charles W. (November 2000). "Toward New Histories of the Civil Rights Era". The Journal of Southern History. 66 (4): 815–848. doi:10.2307/2588012. JSTOR 2588012.
- Fairclough, Adam (December 1990). "Historians and the Civil Rights Movement". Journal of American Studies. 24 (3): 387–398. doi:10.1017/S0021875800033697.
- Frost, Jennifer (May 2012). "Using 'Master Narratives' to Teach History: The Case of the Civil Rights Movement" (PDF). History Teacher. 45 (3): 437–446. Archived (PDF) from the original on April 12, 2015.
- Hall, Jacquelyn Dowd (March 2005). "The Long Civil Rights Movement and the Political Uses of the Past" (PDF). The Journal of American History. 91 (4): 1233–1263. doi:10.2307/3660172. JSTOR 3660172. Archived from the original (PDF) on July 27, 2019.
- Lang, Clarence. "Locating the civil rights movement: An essay on the Deep South, Midwest, and border South in Black Freedom Studies." Journal of Social History 47.2 (2013): 371–400. Online
- Lawson, Steven F. (April 1991). "Freedom Then, Freedom Now: The Historiography of the Civil Rights Movement". The American Historical Review. 96 (2): 456–471. doi:10.2307/2163219. JSTOR 2163219.
- Lawson, Steven F.; Payne, Charles M. (1998). Debating the Civil Rights Movement, 1945–1968. Rowman & Littlefield. ISBN 978-0-8476-9053-4.
- Lawson, Steven F. (2003). Civil Rights Crossroads: Nation, Community, and the Black Freedom Struggle. University Press of Kentucky. ISBN 978-0-8131-2693-7.
- Payne, Charles M. (2007). "Bibliographic Essay: The Social Construction of History". I've Got the Light of Freedom: The Organizing Tradition and the Mississippi Freedom Struggle. University of California Press. pp. 413–442. ISBN 978-0-520-25176-2.
- Robinson, Armstead L.; Sullivan, Patricia, eds. (1991). New Directions in Civil Rights Studies. University of Virginia Press. ISBN 978-0-8139-1319-3.
- Sandage, Scott A. (June 1993). "A Marble House Divided: The Lincoln Memorial, the Civil Rights Movement, and the Politics of Memory, 1939–1963" (PDF). The Journal of American History. 80 (1): 135–167. doi:10.2307/2079700. JSTOR 2079700. Archived from the original (PDF) on April 2, 2015.
- Strickland, Arvarh E.; Weems, Robert E., eds. (2001). The African American Experience: An Historiographical and Bibliographical Guide. Greenwood Press. ISBN 978-0-313-29838-7.
- Zamalin, Alex (2015). African American Political Thought and American Culture: The Nation's Struggle for Racial Justice. Springer. pp. xii, 192. ISBN 978-1-137-52810-0.

=== Autobiographies and memoirs ===
- Carson, Clayborne; Garrow, David J.; Kovach, Bill; Polsgrove, Carol, eds. Reporting Civil Rights: American Journalism 1941–1963 and Reporting Civil Rights: American Journalism 1963–1973. New York: Library of America, 2003. ISBN 1-931082-28-6, 1-931082-29-4.
- Dann, Jim. Challenging the Mississippi Firebombers, Memories of Mississippi 1964–65. Baraka Books, 2013. ISBN 978-1-926824-87-1.
- Holsaert, Faith et al. Hands on the Freedom Plow Personal Accounts by Women in SNCC. University of Illinois Press, 2010. ISBN 978-0-252-03557-9.
- Malcolm X (with the assistance of Alex Haley). The Autobiography of Malcolm X. New York: Random House, 1965. Paperback ISBN 0-345-35068-5. Hardcover ISBN 0-345-37975-6.
