= Timothy L. Jenkins =

American activist, business executive, attorney, and professor (b. 1938)

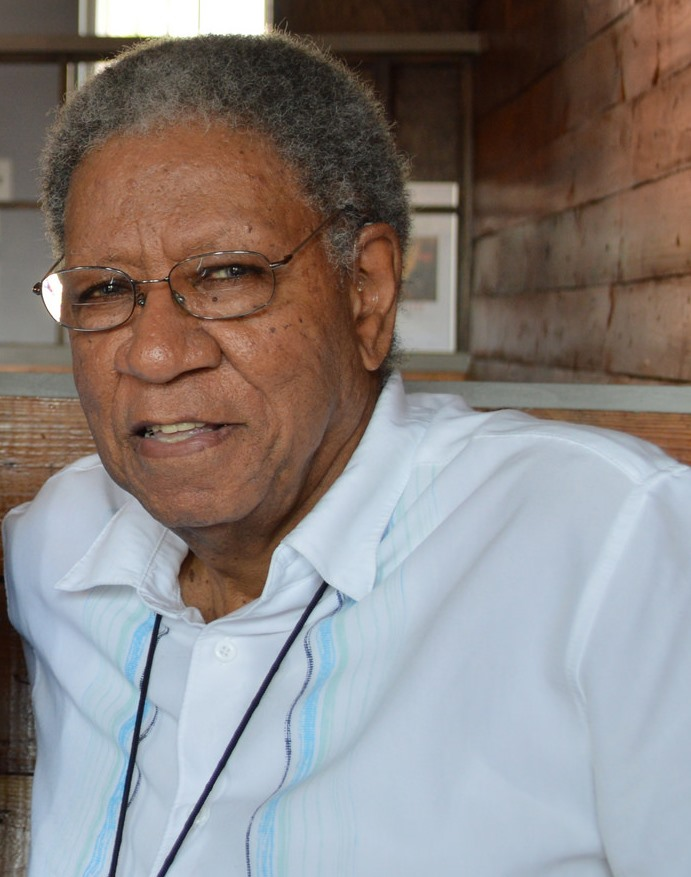
- Born: December 30, 1938 (age 87); Philadelphia, Pennsylvania, U.S.
- Education: Howard University; Yale University
- Occupations: Activist, Attorney, Business Executive, Professor
- Known for: National Student Association, Student Nonviolent Coordinating Committee

Timothy Lionel Jenkins (born December 30, 1938) is an American social and civil rights activist, attorney, educator, and former business and government executive. In the 1960s, he was a co-founder and leader of the Student Nonviolent Coordinating Committee (SNCC) as well as the National Conference of Black Lawyers (NCBL).

== Early life ==
Jenkins was born in Philadelphia, Pennsylvania, December 30, 1938, the last of nine children born of John Thomas Jenkins, a barbershop owner, and Naomi Elizabeth Jenkins, a homemaker. At the turn of the century, his paternal grandfather, Rev O. G Jenkins had been a leading minister in the AME Zion denomination and founder of Hood Temple Church in Richmond, Virginia. He also served as the first president of the historic Courtland Normal and Industrial Institute, an early Rosenwald School that provided education and technical training for African American youth in South Hampton County, Virginia until 1963.

His maternal grandfather was William Albert Jones, a militant black Republican and a Prince Hall Masonic leader in Philadelphia, Pennsylvania who served as a trustee on the city's school board for Colored Schools. As an inquisitive listener, Jenkins spent time after school at his shoeshine stool in his father's barbershop where he witnessed and learned of many of Philadelphia's famous black elites and North Philadelphia residents consisting of truck drivers, bartenders, and street corner" number writers,” and other wage owners. The shop was uniquely gifted by being located just around the corner from Philadelphia's premier social center for Black professionals and business leaders, The Philadelphia Pyramid Club. This allowed him to have frequent exchanges with his father's clientele which included prominent civic and social figures such as Presiding AME Bishop D. Ward Nichols, Rev William H. Gray Sr (father of later Congressman William Gray Jr), A. Leon Higginbotham Jr, Raymond Pace Alexander, Cecil B. Moore, and Reverend Leon Sullivan. All of this exposed Jenkins early on to the meaning of civic activism and leadership.

He simultaneously joined the NAACP Youth Council and frequented Philadelphia's legendary Fellowship House; a Quaker-run settlement house with summer camps devoted to the principles of international social justice and non-violent dispute settlement which had also attracted Martin Luther King Jr. when he was enrolled at Crozer Theological Seminary just outside of Philadelphia. Prior to the advent court- ordered busing to racially integrate public schools, Jenkins’ parents creatively engaged in private " affirmative action" to enroll him in a series of better public schools that were beyond his racially concentrated neighborhood in the Girard Avenue area of North Philadelphia. The first was his elementary school, Thaddeus Stevens School of Observation, a city-wide magnet school designed to train primary school teachers. This was followed by enrollment in Jay Cooke Junior High School, and finally, Central High School (Philadelphia). While at Central, his extracurriculars not only included varsity athletics, but prize-winning debate and oratorical competitions as well.

== Education and political organizing ==
In the Fall of 1956, Jenkins was recruited as a four-year scholarship student to Howard University in Washington D.C. majoring in Political Science and Philosophy. In his senior year, Jenkins was elected student body president and joined the intercollegiate debate team which was co-led by prize-winning writer, Toni Morrison. At Howard, he was significantly influenced by his fortuitous one-one interactions with the University's leading lights such as scholar-poet Sterling A. Brown, theologian-orator Mordecai Wyatt Johnson, historian-Africanist Rayford Logan, and philosophy professor William Banner.

With a keen interest in international affairs, Jenkins spent his sophomore and junior year summers abroad at no expense in France and Yugoslavia understanding global conflicts and cultural diversity under the program, Experiment in International Living. In 1960 he was inducted into Phi Beta Kappa and graduated magna cum laude. Thereafter, he was elected by unanimous membership acclamation to the office of National Affairs Vice President of the United States National Student Association (USNSA), comprising some 400 college and university government associations. After his year in office, he enrolled at Yale Law School, where he obtained a Juris Doctor in 1964. In his last year of law school, he won the school's senior Thurman Arnold Prize for appellate advocacy.

After graduating from law school, Jenkins took the Pennsylvania bar exam and fulfilled required apprenticeship at the prominent Black law firm of Norris, Schmidt, Green, Harris, Higginbotham and Brown. Thereafter, he detoured from legal practice to become the Head of Government Contracting at the international

pharmaceutical company, Smith, Kline, and French Laboratories now known as GlaxoSmithKline in Philadelphia.

=== SNCC ===
While in USNSA and continuing at Yale, Jenkins became one of the founders and principal lobbyist for the Student Non-Violent Coordinating Committee (SNCC). Previously while at Howard, he had engineered funds from the University for SNCC’s April 1960 founding conference in Raleigh, North Carolina. As National Affairs Vice President of USNSA, he was its first national officer from an HBCU and traveled the country mobilizing student government support for the lunch counter desegregation sit-in movement and later Black voting rights in the South, which had been violently suppressed since the Reconstruction era.

In June 1961, Jenkins was a part of the Capahosic Conference, a meeting to launch the coordination of what later became known as the Voter Education Project. A first of its kind effort funded to mobilize educators, civil rights and religious leaders, organizations, and others to develop strategies to promote Black voter education and registration, as well as the increase of Black elected officials in the South.

Following the Capahosic Conference, at the SNCC meeting in July 1961, Charles Sherrod, Joseph C. Jones, and Charles McDew with Jenkins advocated for making SNCC's prime civil rights focus voter registration. The initial call for this direct political shift was met with resistance, if not outright hostility, by other members who felt that the change of direction would demolish the lunch counter sit-ins and "freedom ride" forms of direct-action. Jenkins maintained that voter registration, uniquely protected by federal law and constitutional guarantee, was the best way to strengthen the movement and definitively resolve at once all the objectives of direct activism. Raging disagreements within SNCC extended well into the summer of 1961 until Ella Baker, a veteran civil rights activist and revered advisor, affectionately referred to by the members of SNCC as their " den mother," was able to reconcile the two camps. She urged that SNCC pursue both direct action and voter registration without having internal organizational conflict.

As a result, some became ever more heavily involved in voter registration and election campaigns while others were simultaneously leading direct-action demonstrations for employment and public accommodations. On July 21, 1961, Jenkins organized SNCC's first "Freedom Schools," a month-long residential workshop of student leaders, academics, and civil rights activists at Fisk University in Nashville, Tennessee. The comprehensive objective of the Seminar was to expose SNCC’S leadership to the broad systemic functions of racism in America that produced the economic, political, and social disenfranchisement of African Americans nationally but particularly in the South. This was for many participants, the first academic investigation of racism and its pervasive national and regional roots.

While active throughout the deep South, Mississippi became the primary location for SNCC’s Black voter registration campaign. While at Yale Law School in 1963, Jenkins coordinated a group of 65 students to travel to Mississippi to participate in canvassing for a protest ballot to emphasize the denial of African American voting rights throughout the state under the banner of the Mississippi Freedom Democratic Party (MFDP). According to historian William Chafe, the large scale creation of "Freedom Summer" and the protest election developed in part as a result of the Jenkins's group discovery of a vintage Mississippi legal statute that had been enacted in the late 1800s to enable former secessionist Confederates to cast provisional ballots during the Reconstruction era. "The idea for Freedom Summer emerged during the summer of 1963, when Tim Jenkins, now a Yale Law School student, brought some of his classmates down to Mississippi to see what—if anything—they could do to help Bob Moses register more voters. Someone in Jenkins's group stumbled on an obscure eighty-year-old Mississippi law allowing voters to cast protest ballots in a primary election. Mississippi had passed the law soon after the end of Reconstruction to allow potentially ineligible ex-Confederates to vote. The law students craftily suggested invoking the provision for African Americans denied a chance to vote by local registrars."

The vintage statute was further repurposed for the usage in developing the 1963 Freedom Ballot, in a mock election for the gubernatorial candidacies of the state's NAACP president Aaron Henry as governor and the Chaplain at Tougaloo College, Reverend Edwin King, as lieutenant governor. The objective was to "register" as many African Americans as possible to dispel the racist canard that African Americans were not interested in voting or the political process of running for office. Using funds obtained through the non-profit state-wide Voter Education Project and the local Council of Federated Civic Organizations (COFO), the Mississippi Freedom Ballot initiative commenced from October 14, 1963, to November 4, 1963, and concluded with approximately 80,000 protest voter ballots cast.

In 1965, Jenkins and SNCC were invited by the Chairman of the United States House Judiciary Committee, Emanuel Celler, to appear before the House Judiciary Committee to offer SNCC's testimony on the Voting Rights Act of 1965. SNCC's resulting statement successfully proposed a unique provision requiring two trial judges appointed by the Federal Circuit Court to sit alongside the local lone district court judge in all voting rights cases under the 1965 Voting Rights Act. The provision was designed to dilute the pervasive regional judicial bias of the existing federal bench due to bold segregationist Senatorial nominations. While SNCC's legislative strategy prevailed, many civil rights leaders and organizations were critical of SNCC's provision and opposed it. They argued that the provision was an unnecessary waste of judiciary power that would likely result in fewer cases tried in court. These opponents included civil rights icons Roy Wilkins, Clarence Mitchell Jr, Floyd McKissick, A. Philip Randolph, Whitney Young, Dorothy Height, and Martin Luther King Jr., each of whom later acknowledged the error of their opposition to SNCC's "three-judge" provision and its revolutionary impact.

== Professional career ==
=== Legal ===
In 1964, Jenkins accepted a federal government position as deputy to Richard Alton Graham, a Republican businessman new to civil rights law when appointed by president Lyndon B. Johnson to the original five-member panel of commissioners under Title VII for the Equal Employment Opportunity Commission (EEOC). Under the 1964 Civil Rights Act, the EEOC began working on Title VII without any guidance of legislative history on sex discrimination from Congress. This was due to the fact that the Edith Green, senior member of the Judiciary Committee, had surreptitiously waited until after all of the hearings to insert her sex discrimination provision into the final Act. Jenkins assisted Graham and Women's' rights activist Aileen Hernandez and veteran civil rights attorney Samuel C. Jackson, who had been on the team of Kansas lawyers who argued Brown v. Board, in constructing the first-ever legal definition of sex discrimination as a novel matter of federal law.

Several years after leaving the EEOC, Jenkins partnered with two of his undergraduate honors classmates from Howard University to found a tri-city law firm "Jones, Jenkins, and Warden", with downtown offices in Washington, D.C., San Francisco, New York, as well as satellite branches in Africa and the Caribbean.

Beyond civil rights, he subsequently morphed his legal practice into a management consulting firm under the name of The MATCH Institution to service client needs beyond just legal representation. Along the way, he served simultaneously as both a trustee and special counsel to Howard University during the presidency of James E. Cheek. In this capacity, he facilitated the novel acquisition of both WHUT-TV as an educational television station and WHUR-FM as a commercial radio station. This acquisition allowed Howard to become the only Historically Black College or University to own a television and radio station.

In 1972, Jenkins was additionally charged by Dr. Cheek to legally design and structure Howard University Press, which operated as a publishing house producing revolutionary Black literary works until 2011 without the taint of academic censorship or bias.[

=== Academia ===
Jenkins regularly took "reverse sabbatical" leaves of absence from the professional work of his law and management consulting to accept short term academic posts at Howard University's Law School, The University of the District of Columbia David A. Clarke School of Law, Johns Hopkins University's Institute for Policy Studies and State University of New York at Old Westbury. In 2001, he then was asked by his fellow UDC trustees to serve as the president of the University of the District of Columbia for an interim period assisting in it winning long sought accreditations for both its Nursing and Business schools.

=== Government ===
In 1998, Jenkins was appointed by president Jimmy Carter and confirmed by the United States Senate in 1998 to serve as a Governor of the United States Postal Service. While serving, he chaired its Corporate Responsibility Committee, examining all Postal Service practices to advance minorities and women as supervisors and managers in then the largest civilian workforce in America. During his tenure, Jenkins engaged noted psychologist Kenneth B. Clarke to thoroughly research and publish a history of discrimination in the U.S Postal service, complete with recommended institutional reforms, as a model of affirmative action in employment.

=== Collaborations ===
Beyond SNCC, Jenkins was a founding member of the National Conference of Black Lawyers (NCBL). NCBL considered itself the legal vanguard revolutionary arm of the Black Liberation Movement and variously defended as clients dissident-professor Angela Davis in California, insurrectionists inmates at New York's Attica Prison riot, the Black Panther Party in Illinois, and The Deacons for Defense in Lowndes County, Alabama. As a part of that Black Power era, Jenkins helped to create the National Conference of Black Mayors, Blacks in Government, the National Caucus of Black State Legislators, and the Black Leadership Forum among others.

Against this Avant-Garde record, he also co-founded the Council of 100, an organization of Black Republicans with a mission to master the ropes of government policy procedures for the benefit of the Black community's interests. The Council of 100 was instrumental in lobbying for an unprecedented number of federal government appointments of blacks to high office nationally and regionally. Their efforts resulted in innovative affirmative actions in federal business and housing policies such as "The Selma Accord," the first of its kind in the South, a detailed Federal reparations strategy, as well as minority business set-asides and programs in the Small Business Administration known as "The Revised Philadelphia Plan" during the Republican presidencies of Ronald Reagan, Richard Nixon, Gerald Ford, and George H. W. Bush.

== Personal life ==
In Jenkins' final year of law school he married Lauretta C. Sotak, whom he had met years before at an activist meeting of the U.S National Student Association. Their private wedding was performed on the campus of Yale University with the celebrated Chaplain of Yale, William Sloane Coffin officiating. Purposely, no family members from either side were invited to the ceremony. Their marriage produced two sons, Sterling Augustus Jenkins, a concert violinist, and Nelson Chaka Jenkins, an architect and electrical engineer.

== Current projects ==
Jenkins is on the boards of Teaching for Change, the SNCC Legacy Project[1], the DC School of Law Foundation, and is co-founder and archives committee member of the Friends of Andrew Rankin Memorial Chapel at Howard University.

In 2021, Attorney Jenkins became the lead plaintiff, as one of ten loyal Howard University alumni, in a lawsuit challenging the Board of Trustees' abolishment of Affiliate Trustees (Alumni, Student and Faculty Trustees) without getting any input of those constituent groups. As of January 2026, after the Federal Appeals Court reversed a lower court and returned the case to DC Superior Court, a new lawsuit has been filed. https://akilaworksongs.com/plaintiffs-against-howardu-2021/ In a short video, he and another plaintiff explain their reasons for joining the lawsuit: https://www.instagram.com/p/CXeIWIfJ4sc/

== Publications and articles ==
- Black Futurists in the Information Age: Vision of a 21st Century Technological Renaissance

== Public media ==
Timothy Jenkins on the March on Washington for WITNIFY, Aug 27, 2013, (c) The Washington Post.

Timothy Lionel Jenkins Interview on the Rock Newman Show, October 7, 2015, WHUT-TV.

Timothy Jenkins at the Memorial for Ivanhoe Donaldson, May 13, 2016 at the Metropolitan African Methodist Episcopal Church.

What does "Protect & Serve" mean?" Timothy Jenkins on a multi-media campaign by WHUT on #BlackLivesMatter, August 25, 2016, WHUT-TV.

Timothy Jenkins receives Howard University’s Capstone Group 2022 John Lewis “Good Trouble” award. https://download-video.akamaized.net/2/download/67ec575f-995b-470f-bfbe-498627da2365/f089270d-f428f3a4/timothy_l._jenkins_-_2023_capstone_award%20%281080p%29.mp4?__token__=st=1679667857~exp=1679682257~acl=%2F2%2Fdownload%2F67ec575f-995b-470f-bfbe-498627da2365%2Ff089270d-f428f3a4%2Ftimothy_l._jenkins_-_2023_capstone_award%2520%25281080p%2529.mp4%2A~hmac=5dd472d3d603fc134d8d664ad0ee3290ef0bdf53b0c41a1ea949f38e5069323c&r=dXMtY2VudHJhbDE%3D
