= Council of Federated Organizations =

Coalition of advocacy groups in the Civil Rights Movement

The Council of Federated Organizations (COFO) was a coalition of the major United States Civil Rights Movement organizations operating in Mississippi. COFO was formed in 1961 to coordinate and unite voter registration and other civil rights activities in the state and oversee the distribution of funds from the Voter Education Project. It was instrumental in forming the Mississippi Freedom Democratic Party. COFO member organizations included the National Association for the Advancement of Colored People.

== NAACP ==
The prelude to the Civil Rights Movement in Mississippi began after World War II when veterans such as Medgar Evers, his brother Charles Evers, Aaron Henry, and Amzie Moore returned home from fighting Nazi Germany. These veterans led and revitalized defunct chapters of the National Association for the Advancement of Colored People (NAACP) throughout the state.

After the war, Evers took a job as an insurance salesman. His travels took him to the poorest areas of rural Mississippi. His guilt over attempting to sell insurance policies to families who could barely afford food led to him joining the NAACP in the early 1950s. He soon became the organization's first field secretary in 1954. Friend, fellow veteran, and pharmacist, Aaron Henry also took up the reins of activism by founding and becoming the first president of the Clarksdale, Mississippi branch of the NAACP. Henry organized the local group to have two white men indicted for the kidnapping and rape of two young black girls. The men were acquitted, but getting an indictment at all was a major victory for the young organization. Evers also found organizing work frustrating throughout the 1950s. This work mainly included traveling throughout the state giving "pep talks" to local chapters and investigating racially motivated murders. Despite limited success, the theme of rivalry would reappear in these early stages. Evers, Henry, and fellow NAACP leader Amzie Moore would join the Regional Council of Negro Leadership (RCNL) in 1951 despite objections from the national NAACP office. In addition to joining what Henry called the "homegrown" NAACP, Evers and Henry traveled to New Orleans, Louisiana for the organizational meeting of the Southern Christian Leadership Conference (SCLC). Roy Wilkins, national director of the NAACP, felt threatened by the charismatic leadership of the new organization's leader, Martin Luther King Jr. Evers objected to the national office's concerns on the basis that both organizations' goals were "identical", but respected the national leadership and opposed the SCLC's talk of an office in Jackson, Mississippi. Henry, however remained on the SCLC board and was soon elected state president in 1960. Ironically, this early rivalry would lead to the NAACP devoting more time and attention to its Mississippi chapters.

== SNCC ==
The reluctance of the NAACP to accept new ideas led Amzie Moore to a student conference in Atlanta in 1960. Moore, president of the Cleveland, Mississippi chapter and state vice-president of the NAACP, had become frustrated with the legalistic and slow moving national office, and respected the idealism and devotion of the new student movement in other parts of the country. In Atlanta, Moore met Bob Moses, a young teacher from Harlem in New York City. Moses, a Harvard graduate, was inspired by the North Carolina student sit-ins in February 1960. That summer he volunteered in the corner of the Atlanta SCLC office with the small staff of the newly formed Student Nonviolent Coordinating Committee (SNCC). Moses traveled through Alabama, Mississippi, and Louisiana recruiting young people for SNCC's fall conference. On this tour, Moore shared a vision with Moses that included a statewide, grassroots, voter registration drive spearheaded by students. Concerned about family and career matters at home, Moses agreed to return one year later to embrace Moore's dream. However, it was Moore who was not quite ready for Moses when he returned in the summer of 1961, so Moses found himself farther south in McComb, Mississippi alongside NAACP member C.C. Bryant. The McComb movement consisted of voter registration classes and local student protests. The work in McComb failed to bring any immediate results, but was invaluable training for Moses and the SNCC workers who followed him. They next took their new experiences and reputations with them into the Mississippi Delta.

== CORE ==
The SNCC and NAACP McComb project coincided with the early days of the Freedom Rides sponsored by the Congress of Racial Equality (CORE). The Freedom Riders were an integrated group of students and veteran participants of CORE activities who intended to challenge local segregation laws, and test new federal laws regarding interstate travel by riding together from Washington, D.C., to New Orleans, Louisiana. After the initial thirteen students were stopped by violence in Alabama, SNCC's Diane Nash and other members of the Nashville Student Movement, which had recently finished the Nashville sit-ins, recruited students from Nashville, Tennessee, to finish the Rides. After continued local violence, and protests by the Kennedy administration, these new Riders arrived in Jackson on May 24, 1961. Governor Ross Barnett, promising the Kennedys peace, ordered state and local police to enforce the law. The Freedom Riders were swiftly arrested, tried, and sent to the notorious state prison in Parchman. Replacement riders soon flooded the state and were also sent to Parchman. One of these "replacements" was Dave Dennis of New Orleans. Dennis's future friendship with Moses soon became the vital glue that would maintain the COFO coalition.

== Growing need for unity ==
Several events set the context of the creation of the statewide COFO group. John Doar of the Justice Department arrived in Mississippi to begin investigating claims of people who were prevented from voting and found local support from Aaron Henry. As Freedom Riders converged upon Jackson, Mississippi, Henry and the Clarksdale NAACP attempted to set up a meeting with the Governor Barnett. On his refusal to meet with the civil rights group, they created the Clarksdale Council of Federated Organizations for the meeting. Under this new name, the active middle-class of Clarksdale would continue their ongoing voter registration drive. King briefly appeared in Jackson to make a speech in support of the Freedom Riders. This again worried the national NAACP office, but Evers reassured them that strong chapters in Mississippi would prevent the student movement from gaining local ground. Contrary to Evers' statement, the student movement soon swept through Jackson. Tougaloo College students joined with SNCC workers to create the Non-Violent Action Group to sponsor workshops on nonviolent philosophy, and hold local sit-ins and demonstrations. Evers and black Jacksonians viewed these "outsiders" with contempt. The conflict between the various groups was "generational, organizational, and ideological".

Evers slowly warmed up to the dedication of the young activists of 1961-1962 and asked the national office for permission to endorse the direct action activities. These activities violated the NAACP's traditional practice of working through court cases and pushing voter registration. The request was quickly rejected. Evers was so frustrated by national leaders that he considered leaving the organization. Despite national objections, Henry sent requests in support of the Clarksdale registration drives and boycotts to King in Atlanta and Tom Gaither of CORE. Gaither and Moses joined forces in a memo to national SNCC and CORE offices about a coordinated voter registration drive throughout Mississippi focusing primarily on areas where blacks made up 45 percent of the population. Evers and Henry became convinced of the need for unity, instead of an overlap in operation, on a trip to Los Angeles. During the trip the Mississippi activists observed local Jewish groups working in harmony towards a common cause. Soon Henry, Evers, Moses, and Dennis met in Jackson to discuss the possibilities of a coordinated effort throughout Mississippi.

== COFO ==
Nationally, many members of the Justice Department took a vengeful attitude towards the hostile southern states after the Freedom Rides. The Atlanta-based Southern Regional Council found this new aggression helpful in creating the Voter Education Project (VEP). VEP funded registration activities under the supervision of the Justice Department throughout the south. Soon after the Evers-Henry-Moses-Dennis Jackson meeting, VEP director Wiley A Branton, and James Bevel of the SCLC, traveled to Clarksdale to meet with the Jackson planners and other Mississippi leaders. Branton found the local activists receptive to the coordinated effort and grants that VEP could provide. The main opposition again came from Roy Wilkins of the national NAACP office. He considered Mississippi to be NAACP territory and did not want his organization's funds to be spent through groups like SNCC. Since the heads of each national organization had veto power in decisions regarding VEP funds, Branton proposed a smokescreen organization that would allow local groups to cooperate, but would avoid the interference of detached national groups. This need, and the vision discussed in the Jackson meeting, gave birth to the statewide revamp of the Council of Federated Organizations (COFO).

The leadership of the new organization included President Henry, Program Director Moses, Assistant Program Director Dennis, and Secretary Carsie Hall, a Jackson attorney. The Presidency was supposed to rotate among the heads of each major organization, but Henry retained the role because "no one else seemed interested". Membership included all four national organizations and local groups like the RCNL, Jackson Nonviolent Group, and the Holmes County Voters League. COFO staff members retained their organizational affiliation, with SNCC providing most of the workers. For the most part, the work of individual organizations also fell under the COFO umbrella. SNCC and CORE were especially bound by the friendship and close partnership of Moses and Dennis making their activities "indistinguishable". The coordinated effort made several key accomplishments. It legitimized the work of the younger students by bonding them to older and respected leaders. This opened long-established networks to SNCC and CORE workers. Moreover, coordination cut through age, economic, and organizational rivalries which had hindered mass efforts for years.

As COFO's new staff began their organizing work throughout the state, they chose to concentrate mostly on the Mississippi Delta. This region held the highest black population of any in the state, and the sharecropper population provided a natural constituency. The new organization had two main purposes: attracting more Federal support, and creating a truly grassroots movement. There would be some direct action demonstrations, but the focus was massive voter registration, a federally protected act. The SNCC and CORE workers found mentors in older activists like Henry and Moore. These more established leaders provided the inroads that the new arrivals needed, and liked their focus on creating local leaders. A truly grassroots movement would debunk the myth of outside agitators that the state of Mississippi commonly used to defend its own position. Many of these new recruits were teenagers and young adults. In examples like Moses, Sam Block (a local student) found courage to challenge the Leflore County Sheriff and the discipline to continue these challenges. Women, like Fannie Lou Hamer were also a major part of this new spring of leadership. Traditionally, the NAACP and SCLC put women into offices and background positions, but mentors like Ella Baker had a lasting influence on SNCC workers that extended to the local women they contacted. The increased use of women and young people caused some tension among COFO's contributing organizations, but it only proved to be one of many coming disagreements.

Worker recruitment, and new registration activities around the state, created a stir among the white population. Though this caused fear among the local blacks and civil rights workers, it did not slow the activities. Violence continued as boycotts of businesses began in Jackson, Clarksdale, and Greenwood. Gun ownership was a way of life in rural Mississippi. The nonviolent "outside" organizers had to learn to reconcile this fact with their nonviolence. After brutal attacks on workers, including the very visible and vocal Hamer and Ed King (a white chaplain at Tougaloo College), nonviolent subscribers came to accept armed self-defense as necessary and even compatible with the nonviolent philosophy. A 1963 NAACP newsletter stated, "We will never strike the first violent blow. We point out to our white attackers that in the future… you are going to get your lick right back."

The violence reached new heights and again gained national attention on June 12, 1963. Shortly after midnight, Evers who for many symbolized the Mississippi movement, was assassinated in his driveway after returning from a rally. Minor rioting after his funeral was followed by an increase in sit-ins and protests throughout the state. This was met with more violence by whites. In an attempt to avoid frustration, COFO workers organized the Freedom Vote to coincide with Mississippi's gubernatorial elections. This provided focus for the black population and showed the federal government that local blacks would vote if allowed. A convention for this massive mock election was held in Jackson. Henry and Ed King were selected as candidates for governor and lieutenant governor. Approximately, seventy white students from Stanford and Yale were brought in for a week to "register" "voters." Many of these students were harassed, but there were no major violent incidents. Debate over the use of white volunteers was an ongoing issue, but many believed these outside workers were useful and necessary. Dennis believed that after the Freedom Vote, "there was less fear in the Negro community in taking part in civil rights activities".

This new boldness contributed to two very different actions. COFO planners began to discuss a mass influx of volunteers for actual voter registration in the summer of 1964. In response to these activities and rumors of more actions, the Ku Klux Klan experienced a revival in late 1963 to early 1964. To make planning easier, steps were taken to make COFO into a firmer organization. A constitution was adopted, and monthly meetings were held in Jackson. Moses, Dennis, and others discussed plans to turn their positions over to local leaders. SNCC's national office opposed a strengthened COFO. This opposition was connected to the competition over funds with the NAACP. It became heated after VEP cut off its funding. VEP did not see the relevance of the Freedom Vote despite its popularity within the state. Moses reaffirmed his loyalty to the SNCC executive committee. Lawrence Guyot came to his defense by asserting that "in Mississippi SNCC is COFO." COFO also asserted its authority over the recruitment of volunteers for the summer. Allard Lowenstien, a white, northern activist assumed that he could use his contacts from the Freedom Vote to recruit for the summer project. Moses and others worked quickly to inform him that "all decisions on volunteers would be made in Jackson".

== Freedom Summer ==
White violence became more intense as the summer approached. Volunteers were recruited from mostly northern, white campuses. They became voter registration canvassers and Freedom School teachers. CORE staff members Michael Schwerner and wife Rita arrived in Meridian, Mississippi in spring to prepare for the new volunteers. Schwerner befriended James Chaney, a local black activist. Chaney and Schwerner spoke at Mt. Zion Methodist Church in Neshoba County only a few days before traveling to Oxford, Ohio with other COFO workers to train the volunteers. During this orientation, the Klan burned Mt. Zion Church. On hearing this news, Chaney and Schwerner decided to return early to Mississippi. They carried six of the volunteers with them to Meridian, including Andrew Goodman who had been personally recruited for the project by Schwerner.

The following day, Chaney, Schwerner, and Goodman traveled to Neshoba County to investigate the church fire. The trio was arrested following a traffic stop outside Philadelphia, Mississippi, for speeding, escorted to the local jail and held for several hours. As they left town in their car after being released, the trio were followed by law enforcement and others. Before leaving Neshoba County their car was pulled over and they were abducted, driven to another location, and shot at close range. Their bodies were then transported to an earthen dam where they were buried. They were only discovered two months later thanks to a tip-off. During the investigation, it emerged that members of the local White Knights of the Ku Klux Klan, the Neshoba County Sheriff's Office and the Philadelphia, Mississippi Police Department were involved in the incident. Their arrest, kidnapping, and murder were intended to intimidate the incoming volunteers. Instead, it invigorated the already determined 'outside agitators' and brought international attention to the state.

The summer newcomers included experienced activists like Stokely Carmichael. He became the head of the Greenwood summer project. Summer projects in Greenwood and other parts of the state created Freedom Schools mostly in the homes of local people to supplement the lack of black schools in the area. It was believed that education would create more and well-informed voters. Forty-one Freedom Schools, with over 2100 students, were held around the state. In these schools, teachers discussed current topics with their students who in turn produced newspapers. In many parts of the state, these "Freedom Papers" were the only source of civil rights news. As well as the debate over white volunteers, another rivalry existed among the volunteers. Voter registration was considered the most sought after job. Many of these "lucky" workers considered Freedom School teachers to be beneath their position. Some viewed the teaching jobs as "woman's work." These small rivalries contributed to already strained feelings exacerbated by the ongoing violence.

== MFDP ==
COFO leaders decided before the Freedom Vote that the Democratic Party was their best inroad to political power. At a meeting on March 15, 1964, it was decided that an alternate party should be formed to challenge the regular state delegation to the Democratic National convention to be held on August 24. This was the birth of the Mississippi Freedom Democratic Party (MFDP). By July, the summer project's focus began to shift toward preparations for the convention. Moses sent notice to workers throughout the state that, "everyone who is not working in Freedom Schools ... devote all their time organizing for the convention challenge". On August 6, the MFDP held a statewide convention in Jackson (two days after the discovery of the bodies of Chaney, Schwerner, and Goodman). The delegation of sixty-eight was formed with Henry as chairman, and Ed King as vice-chair, with the aim of convincing the Credentials Committee of the unjust practices of the regular state delegation, and that the MFDP was the true Mississippi delegation. Moses felt that the mostly middle-class representatives of Jackson looked down on Hamer and the delegation's poorer, rural members.

Former Governor Barnett was the first member of the regular Democratic Party to express his concerns. He stated that blacks were "unqualified to vote" and that "we don't believe in having ignorant people elect our officials." Delegations from other southern states threatened to walk out of the convention if the MFDP were seriously entertained. President Lyndon Johnson, who was struggling to satisfy various factions within the party, reached out to Wilkins. Wilkins (overlooking the MFDP's chairman was his organization's state president) assured Johnson that the NAACP's participation in the challenge was token and a face-saving move within the state. Upon arriving in Atlantic City, the MFDP staged various protests inside and outside the convention hall, the most famous being Hamer's "Is this America?" speech. Johnson was so angry and embarrassed by the incident that he interrupted the end of the speech to update the nation on Vietnam. Hubert Humphrey, whose vice-presidential nomination hinged on his "handling" of the MFDP distraction, brought the Credential Committee's compromise offer to Moses, Henry, Ed King, and Martin Luther King Jr. (who had come to support the MFDP). Henry and Ed King received two "at-large" seats on the convention floor, and non-discrimination standards were put in place for the 1968 convention. Ed King offered to give his seat to a more representative farm worker. Humphrey (fearing that he had Hamer in mind) responded that "the President will not allow that illiterate woman to speak from the floor of the convention". This turned Moses against any form of compromise, but the group took the proposal back to the MFDP delegation. Henry, Ed King, and most of the delegation's middle class members were in favor of the compromise. The delegation's rural members, backed by SNCC workers, cast their vote with Hamer, who responded "We didn't come all this way for no two seats." On hearing of the rejection, Wilkins told Hamer, "You people are ignorant, you don't know anything about politics ... Why don't you pick up and return to Mississippi?" After more demonstrating, this is exactly what the delegation did, but not before one last appeal by Congressman William L. Dawson of Chicago to accept the compromise and "follow leadership".

== Dissatisfaction ==
Bitterness set in after the convention. The middle class was even more resentful of their poorer representatives in the COFO leadership. Many workers later saw the convention as the beginning of the split between the political sides of the movement and the more militant activists. SNCC worker Cleveland Sellers noted that after the convention, the "movement was not for civil rights, but for liberation". Moses especially came to resent the Democratic Party. He felt it was willing to allow poorer blacks to receive benefits from civil rights legislation, but not participate in decision-making.

Despite what many saw as a failure at the Atlantic City convention, the MFDP continued to gain support in Mississippi. Many middle class and "established" black leaders blamed SNCC (which they equated with COFO) for the lack of compromise. Northern liberals who were a key source of funds shifted their support to the now independent MFDP. Gloster B. Current, director of branches for the NAACP, complained to Wilkins that COFO was stealing the NAACP's territory, and that SNCC was turning the young people against them. In November, the state branch withdrew its support from COFO. Henry remained COFO president and was confronted at the state convention the following month. He complained that the NAACP had been excluded from the planning of many activities and was called "only after people were in jail". He also stated that the casual dress and attitude of the COFO staff were offensive to traditional leaders. Hamer responded that local decision-making had been a priority and that the casual dress is what attracted the young people.

Moses was extremely disillusioned after the convention. The success of the MFDP did not encourage him. He felt that the party was "following national programs" (continued attempts at voter registration, party conventions), and was alienating the poorer portions of the population. He resigned from COFO in late 1964 and left the state in early 1965. Dennis had also grown bitter after the convention and the murders of Chaney, Schwerner, and Goodman. He began to question if COFO's tactics were effective given the high costs and limited gains that could be seen. He returned to New Orleans in early 1965, where he attempted to continue work with CORE. He soon quit and opened his own law practice. With the MFDP taking over most political activities, the remaining COFO staff began to sponsor medical services, and provide legal assistance in rural areas. This stretched the already thin funds even more. The ongoing SNCC debate over the role of white volunteers and staff weakened its organization in the state, which in turn weakened an already splintering COFO. At a SNCC executive committee, Jim Foreman called for the dismantling of COFO citing the withdrawal of the NAACP, and the growing political influence of the MFDP. He also raised concerns about the low morale, and the lack of active projects and effective leadership after Moses' departure. COFO's July state meeting in Tougaloo was its last. Members voted to abolish the organization. Staff members were offered positions with the MFDP, which would also take up the remaining projects. CORE and SNCC became less active in the years following COFO's demise. Disagreements, although present from the beginning, seemed to get most of the attention after the return of the MFDP delegation. Like Moses, many workers believed that the abolition of the COFO coalition was a mistake. He felt that it was the only organization to represent the entire black community in Mississippi.

== Historiography ==
There seem to be two views among historians and researchers concerning the role of COFO in Mississippi – the "national" view and the "local" view. The national view is demonstrated in Taylor Branch's Parting the Waters. In his account, Wiley Branton presents the idea of COFO at the VEP Clarksdale meeting solely for the purpose of distributing funds. This explains how COFO as an organization was so easily lost in the activities of the early 1960s. Most historical accounts focus on SNCC's work and the MFDP's trip to the Atlantic City convention. Others have acknowledged its existence but merely stated that SNCC and CORE worked together under the auspices of COFO. In the mid-1990s, two now standard works were written about the Mississippi efforts. John Dittmer's Local People and Charles Payne's I've Got the Light of Freedom brought to life the contributions of local activists and indigenous leadership. Dittmer acknowledges the traditional view, but makes clear that many participants opposed this notion. Moses and Dennis in particular felt that COFO's primary function was to provide native Mississippians with their own organization, something that they could control. Payne so wholly incorporates the "local view" into his work that he barely mentions the influence of VEP funds in COFO's creation or maintenance. Likewise, in their autobiographies, Henry and Moses view the founding of COFO as an effort to unify all the organizations within the state and make no mention of outside influences. In the context of the wider Mississippi Movement, COFO can only be viewed as a logical and necessary step towards accomplishing common goals. Like the whole Civil Rights Movement, COFO's ultimate effectiveness is debated, but for a time, it brought together rivals and people of competing philosophies to build a better society.

== Bibliography ==
- Branch, Taylor. Parting the Waters: America in the King Years, 1954- 1963. New York: Simon & Schuster Inc., 1988.
- Branch, Taylor. Pillar of Fire: America in the King Years, 1963-1964. New York: Simon & Schuster Inc., 1998.
- Dirks, Annelieke. "Between Threat and Reality: The National Association for the Advancement of Colored People and the Emergence of Armed Self-Defense in Clarksdale and Natchez, Mississippi, 1960-1965." Journal for the Study of Radicalism 1 (2007): 71–98.
- Dittmer, John. Local People: The Struggle for Civil Rights in Mississippi. Urbana and Chicago: University of Illinois Press, 1994.
- Henry, Aaron and Constance Curry. Aaron Henry: The Fire Ever Burning. Jackson, Ms: University of Mississippi Press, 2000.
- Marsh, Charles. God's Long Summer: Stories of Faith and Civil Rights. Princeton: Princeton University Press, 1997.
- Moses, Robert P. and Charles E. Cobb. Radical Equations: Math Literacy and Civil Rights. Boston: Beacon Press, 2001.
- Payne, Charles M. I've Got the Light of Freedom: The Organizing Tradition and the Mississippi Freedom Struggle. Berkeley: University of California Press, 1995.
- Polletta, Francesca. "The Structural Context of Novel Rights Claims: Southern Civil Rights Organizing, 1961- 1966." Law & Society Review 34 (2000): 367–406.
- Sturkey, William. "'I Want to Become a Part of History': Freedom Summer, Freedom Schools, and the Freedom News." Journal of African American History (2010): 348- 368.
