= Ed King (activist) =

American minister and activist (1936–2026)

- Born: Ralph Edwin King Jr. September 20, 1936; Vicksburg, Mississippi, U.S.
- Died: July 4, 2026 (aged 89); Jackson, Mississippi, U.S.
- Occupations: Civil rights leader, minister, politician, educator
- Known for: Chaplaincy at Tougaloo College; Faculty at University of Mississippi Medical Center; Civil Rights Movement; Freedom Summer; Mississippi Freedom Democratic Party
- Spouse: Jeannette Sylvester (m. 1958–1984)
- Children: 2

Ralph Edwin King Jr. (September 20, 1936 – July 4, 2026), better known as Ed King, was a United Methodist minister, civil rights activist and educator. He was a key figure in historic civil rights events taking place in Mississippi, including the Jackson Woolworth's sit-in of 1963 and the Freedom Summer project in 1964. King held the position of chaplain and dean of students, 1963–1967, at Tougaloo College in Jackson, Mississippi. At this critical juncture of the civil rights movement, historian John Dittmer described King as "the most visible white activist in the Mississippi movement."

As Tougaloo College chaplain, King collaborated with many of the key figures in the civil rights movement, including Bob Moses and others from the Student Nonviolent Coordinating Committee (SNCC), Medgar Evers of the NAACP, James Farmer and David Dennis of CORE, Dr. Martin Luther King of the Southern Christian Leadership Conference (SCLC), and activists from the Mississippi COFO (Council of Federated Organizations), including Fannie Lou Hamer, Lawrence Guyot, and John Salter.

King was also a co-founder of the Mississippi Freedom Democratic Party (MFDP), a member of the Democratic National Committee, and a delegate to three Democratic National Conventions. He and other surviving MFDP delegates were honored at the 2004 Democratic National Convention in Boston on the 40th anniversary of their efforts to end racial discrimination in the Democratic party.

== Early life ==
King was born on September 20, 1936, in Vicksburg, Mississippi, to Ralph Edwin King Sr. and Julia Wilma Tucker King. His father, whose family came from West Virginia and Louisiana, was an engineer with the Mississippi River Commission. His mother's family had deep roots in the antebellum history of Mississippi. King's great-grandfather had served under General Robert E. Lee, and his grandfather, J. W. Tucker, was sheriff of Warren County, Mississippi.

As a youngster growing up in historic Vicksburg, King was deeply moved by stories of the deprivation his family suffered during what was called the "Yankee torture" of the besieged city near the end of the Civil War. King spent many hours at the Vicksburg battleground, reflecting on the great costs of war. While still in his teens, he was drawn to pacifism and became an admirer of Mahatma Gandhi. Later, he recalled that pacifism came to him much earlier than more progressive attitudes about race.

A good but not overly distinguished student, King was never subjected to standardized testing until his senior year at Carr Central High School. Suffering a sinus infection while taking the SAT test, he was convinced he had done poorly and would never be admitted to Millsaps College, a popular destination for high achievers. "Two weeks later I learned I had won a scholarship," King said, "having probably placed second or third in the state."

== Education ==
=== Millsaps College (1954–1958) ===
While still in high school, King attended church youth meetings at Millsaps College, a Methodist liberal arts school in Jackson. He never considered going to any college other than Millsaps, where, as a student, he was to witness firsthand the depth of white resistance to the Supreme Court's landmark desegregation decision, Brown v. Board of Education.

As an undergraduate at Millsaps, King attended all-white Citizens' Councils meetings and was dismayed to see how white moderates were forced into silence. He also participated in interracial meetings at nearby Tougaloo College, where he met Medgar Evers and other prominent black civil rights leaders. Other important influences for King at Millsaps were sociology chair Ernst Borinski (a refugee from Nazi Germany), vocal critic of segregation George Maddox, and philosophy chair Robert Bergmark.

=== Boston University (1958–1963) ===
After graduating from Millsaps in 1958, King left Mississippi to attend Boston University School of Theology, where he became a regular participant in interdisciplinary meetings of religious, pacifist, and civil rights activists.

In December 1958, he met Martin Luther King Jr. in Montgomery, Alabama, starting a friendship that led to his involvement in the planning of the 1960 civil rights sit-ins with Rev. Jim Lawson of the Fellowship of Reconciliation. It was in Montgomery in March 1960 that Ed King was first arrested for acts of civil disobedience.

King received two degrees from Boston University: Master of Divinity (1961) and Master of Sacred Theology (1963).

=== Other education ===
King also attended the University of Michigan (summer 1956) and Harvard Divinity School (on a Merrill Fellowship, 1966).

== Activism ==
=== Roots of dissent ===
Like the majority of middle-class white Southerners of his era, King was raised to embrace a noblesse oblige attitude toward blacks. He would later describe this as "a practice that manifested itself in occasional donations of used clothing or holiday baskets of food or a comfortable paternalism that allowed many whites to believe that their duties—as Christians or otherwise—toward their black neighbors had been satisfied."

=== Early arrests ===
In March 1960, King took leave from his seminary studies to volunteer in Montgomery, Alabama, where, on behalf of the Fellowship of Reconciliation, he helped organize secret interracial meetings where black students could mingle with white ministers and students from Huntingdon College. At this point, King preferred to work behind the scenes, building bridges between blacks and whites. He had made it clear to the Fellowship that he did not want to take part in sit-ins or other activities that could result in his arrest—and bring notoriety that would prevent him from becoming the pastor of a white church in Mississippi. But the course of events led in another direction.

While attending a lunch-time meeting at the black-owned Regal Cafe, King was arrested along with 20 other people—including Rev. Ralph Abernathy—by police targeting activists affiliated with the SCLC. The local press played up the presence of "northern agitators" at the restaurant, including a young minister from Boston. Represented in court by civil rights attorneys Fred Grey and Clifford Durr, all of the arrested were found guilty of "disturbing the peace." Native white southerners, Durr and his wife convinced King that the arrest and imprisonment of white ministers would be of great benefit to the civil rights movement.

When the national media picked up on the story, repercussions from the arrest were felt by King's family in Vicksburg, who were horrified to see a photo of their son on the Today show. Years later, King wrote, "My father was calm but angry as he condemned my foolishness and the people who had 'misled' me."

White Methodist church leaders in Mississippi told the Kings that their son was under the influence of liberal Communist teachers who had infiltrated the seminary at Boston University. Others in the community believed King's parents were also culpable. "Although his parents did not share King's beliefs and remained segregationists themselves, they were the subject of attacks by the Citizens' Councils and the John Birch Society. Neighbors and fellow church members shunned the couple." A second arrest in Montgomery followed on June 7, this time the result of a deliberate action planned by King and attorney Fred Grey. King invited Rev. Elroy Embry, a black Methodist clergyman, to dine with him at the Plantation Dining Room in the Jefferson Davis Hotel, where the younger man was staying. Alerted to the meeting, the police arrested the two ministers, both of whom were subsequently convicted of disorderly conduct and trespassing. King and Embry were each sentenced to two weeks of service on a prison work gang. (A local newspaper published a photo of King wearing the striped work clothing routinely issued to prisoners.) The arrests and King's growing involvement in civil rights activities effectively ended any hopes the young minister might have had of serving a white Methodist church in his home state.

=== Tougaloo College ===
With their hopes of a future in Mississippi in doubt after his arrests, King and his wife Jeannette, a Jackson native, considered putting down roots in Massachusetts. But events unfolding around the admission of James Meredith to Ole Miss inspired the couple to return to Mississippi to take part in a growing civil rights movement that was now centered in their home state.

In 1962, Ernst Borinski alerted King that the chaplaincy of Tougaloo College was vacant and urged him to apply for the post. Medgar Evers was more direct about the opportunity: "You have to come back because we need you, because this, my friend, is your calling."

Any resentment over hiring a white Southern man as the chaplain of a predominately black student body was deflected by King's history as a civil rights activist who was willing to put himself at risk. His arrests for defying Jim Crow laws made him a relevant candidate: "I couldn't have done it [become Chaplain] if I had not had a prison record," King later wrote.

As chaplain, King expected that he would provide background support for student activists, but once again he was propelled into a more active role by events that made Tougaloo the unofficial capital of the civil rights movement in Mississippi.

=== Jackson Woolworth's sit-in ===
In 1963, King played a part in an act of civil disobedience that gave the movement some of its most iconic images. On May 28, he and a small group of Tougaloo students and faculty drove 10 mi (16 km) to downtown Jackson, joining multiracial demonstrators attempting to dine at a whites-only lunch counter in the Woolworth's store near the Governor's mansion. As one of several demonstrations planned with guidance from Medgar Evers of the NAACP, the sit-in was a small-scale challenge to the Jim Crow custom of denying black Americans their most basic rights.

King had been assigned the role of "spotter," so he could avoid arrest and provide regular, live telephone reports to John Salter and Evers, who were monitoring the action from the Jackson NAACP office. Wearing his ministerial clerical collar (often called a bullet-proof vest by members of SNCC), King stood behind three black students, Anne Moody, Pearlena Lewis, and Memphis Norman, who had volunteered to sit at the lunch counter.

News of the sit-in spread quickly, and soon a large crowd of whites descended on the store. The mob crowded the aisles near the counter, screaming obscenities, dumping condiments on the students, and even punching and kicking demonstrators. As the confrontation escalated, King phoned Evers to report what was happening at the counter.

The police gathered outside the building made no attempt to curb the violence. The only people taken into custody were several whites picketing outside (including King's wife Jeanette, arrested for blocking the sidewalk). At one point, King went outside to confront Police Captain John Lee Ray and plead for the police to protect the demonstrators. Ray refused, claiming that the Supreme Court's desegregation ruling prevented officers of the law from interfering unless a store manager requested help. King rushed back into the store to ask management to intervene, but was unable to find anyone who would admit to being in charge. He then phoned Tougaloo College's president, Dr. A. D. Beittel, who in turn asked national church leaders to help bring Woolworth's corporate executives into the conversation. The situation was not defused until three hours later, when local management finally closed the store on orders from the national headquarters in New York City.

A few weeks later—and just six days after the assassination of Medgar Evers in Jackson— King and John Salter were injured in a suspicious car crash—victims of what official police records called a traffic accident. The crash shattered King's jaw, causing disfiguring facial damage that would require numerous surgeries over the next 12 years.

=== Freedom Vote and campaign for lieutenant governor ===
In 1963, very few black citizens were registered to vote in the American South. To demonstrate that black Americans were willing and able to participate in the electoral process, civil rights activists invited the state's black population to participate in the Freedom Vote, a non-binding mock election scheduled to take place in parallel with the 1963 Mississippi gubernatorial race between two white establishment candidates, Paul B. Johnson Jr. and Rubel Phillips.

In October 1963, SNCC organizer and voting rights activist Bob Moses asked King to become the Freedom Vote candidate for Lieutenant Governor of Mississippi and running mate of the Mississippi Freedom Democratic Party (MFDP) candidate for Governor, black pharmacist Aaron Henry.

King and Henry campaigned side by side at traditional sites of Mississippi political rallies, including the base of the Washington County Confederate Memorial statue near the courthouse in Greenville. Over 80,000 black Mississippians participated in the mock election, casting votes at local churches, beauty parlors, and a handful of black-owned service stations across the state. SNCC was joined by Al Lowenstein in promoting the campaign and enlisting students from Stanford and Yale to help after local staff had been jailed. The Freedom Vote successfully demonstrated the desire of black Americans to vote when free from the fear of harassment by whites.

=== Freedom Summer ===
Building on the success of the Freedom Vote, King become a leading organizer of Freedom Summer (1964), a volunteer campaign to help black Mississippians reclaim their right to vote, a basic civil right they were denied by Jim Crow societal barriers built into the voter registration process and other discriminatory laws and regulations. Over 1,000 volunteers from all over the country—mostly white college students—came to Mississippi to help canvas black communities, encouraging people to register and instructing them in the process.

As local organizers for Freedom Summer and the MFDP, Ed and Jeannette King were heavily involved with the voter registration initiative, the formation of Freedom Schools, and the MFDP challenge to the legitimacy of the Mississippi Democratic party, which limited participation to whites at a time when blacks made up 40 percent of the state's population. To extend its reach to the local black population, the project set up Freedom Houses to shelter volunteers and established community centers in small towns throughout Mississippi.

Historian John Dittmer observed that by the summer of 1964, King had become "the most visible white activist in the Mississippi [civil rights] movement, and he paid a heavy price for honoring his convictions." Since becoming a civil rights activist, King had been arrested and jailed, beaten, and even hospitalized with injuries related to an attempt on his life.

King actively worked to disrupt and desegregate white churches that had helped create the conditions that made Freedom Summer necessary. He believed that "[i]f white moderates, stirred by a Christian conscience … began to support any kind of change in racial patterns in Jackson … then the door was open, not just the church door, but the door to the possibilities of moderate, gradual change in all Mississippi."

King's focus was on getting white moderates across the state involved while preventing an eruption of racial violence in response to the federally-mandated integration of public schools scheduled for the fall of 1964.

=== MFDP challenge at the 1964 Democratic National Convention ===
Recognizing that state officials had made it almost impossible to register black voters as members of the traditional Democratic party, civil rights activists shifted their focus to building the Mississippi Freedom Democratic Party (MFDP), through an alternative signup process that made registration simple and safe. By registering with the MFDP, black Mississippians were spared from having to submit to a literacy test designed to humiliate them, or trying to register at courthouses where white segregationists controlled the process.

On August 6, 1964, the MFDP held a statewide convention in which membership decided to mount a challenge to the credentials of the Mississippi Democratic party by naming their own alternate slate of electors to attend the Democratic National Convention scheduled to take place in Atlantic City, New Jersey, later in the month. King was elected as National Committeeman and a member of the MFDP leadership, along with Victoria Gray, Lawrence Guyot, Fannie Lou Hamer, and Aaron Henry. Despite unrelenting pressure from the White Citizens' Council and other Jim Crow supporters, the MFDP elected 68 delegates to the Democratic National Convention. (Of the four whites on the delegate list, three were connected to Tougaloo College.)

Soon after arriving In Atlantic City, the MFDP challenged the right of the Mississippi Democratic party's delegation to participate in the convention because the delegates had been elected illegally, as part of a segregated process violating both party regulations and federal law. The MFDP asked the Credentials Committee to seat its own slate of delegates instead of the white-only regulars. At the official hearing, MFDP speakers included King, Fannie Lou Hamer, Aaron Henry, Martin Luther King, and Rita Schwerner. Hamer gave an emotionally charged speech, describing how her attempt to register as a voter resulted in the loss of her job, eviction from her home, and a savage beating—a testimony that galvanized voters across the nation, bringing considerable pressure upon the Democratic party.

Despite evidence that most Democrats favored ousting the regular delegates, party leadership feared that delegations from other Southern states would bolt the party if the MFDP challenge was successful.

The political jockeying was intense. At the same time the Credentials Committee was meeting, MFDP delegates Aaron Henry and King were closeted in a hotel room with COFO (Council of Federated Organizations) chair Bob Moses, trying to fashion a compromise with Hubert Humphrey, Walter Reuther, Bayard Rustin, Martin Luther King Jr., and Andrew Young. In an effort to defuse the controversy, party leaders, acting on behalf of President Lyndon Johnson offered the MFDP two at-large seats to be filled by Aaron Henry and Ed King.

Believing it was paternalistic of Johnson to name the two at-large delegates instead of allowing the delegates to vote on the two-seat proposal and choose who should represent them, King offered a counterproposal that gave MFDP delegates more of a voice at the convention. "In his comparatively mild manner, he [King] pushed for a modification in the compromise: Break the two at-large votes in half, then apportion the four half-votes to Henry, King, Fannie Lou Hamer, and another Negro woman, Victoria Gray."

Humphrey rejected the proposal, insisting that President Johnson was adamantly opposed to allowing an "illiterate woman" (Hamer) to speak on the floor of the Democratic Convention. Afterwards, Aaron Henry said about the offer: "Now, Lyndon made the typical white man's mistake: Not only did he say, 'You've got two votes,' which was too little, but he told us to whom the two votes would go. He'd give me one and Ed King one; that would satisfy. … But now, what kind of fool am I, or what kind of fool would Ed have been, to accept gratuities for ourselves?"

The MFDP delegation refused the offer and left the convention rather than be forced to accept token representation. National media condemned the MFDP for being naïve and unready for political participation, insisting that the time was past for protest.

=== MFDP National Committeeman and delegate to DNC ===
From 1964 to 1968, King served as MFDP National Committeeman with Victoria Gray as Committeewoman, on the Democratic National Committee. He was also served as a delegate to the Democratic National Convention in 1968 and 1972. In 2004, at the Democratic National Convention held in Boston, Massachusetts, delegates recognized the 40th anniversary of the MFDP challenge by honoring Fannie Lou Hamer, King and the other "outlaw" delegates who championed desegregation of the Democratic party.

=== 1966 Third District Congressional race ===
In 1966, King was nominated as MFDP candidate for the Third District Congressional seat. King ran against incumbent John Bell Williams as part of another interracial ticket with Rev. Clifton Whitley. King received 22 percent of the vote, the best showing of any MFDP candidate that year.

=== Delta Ministry ===
In 1967, King left Tougaloo to devote himself to the Delta Ministry, the church group he founded to support the Freedom Summer initiative. The Delta Ministry would grow into a longer-term project promoting the economic development of the Mississippi Delta region.

=== Methodist Board of Missions ===
In 1970, King joined the Methodist Board of Missions (later known as Global Ministries) as a special envoy giving lectures and sermons in New York and India, where he and his family lived during 1971 while King was involved with nonviolence development research at the Mahatma Gandhi Peace Foundation in New Delhi.

=== ACLU leadership ===
From 1973 to 1977, King served as president of the American Civil Liberties Union of Mississippi and a member of the ACLU's National Board.

== Later years ==
King continued to lecture extensively on his experiences during the civil rights movement and was a frequent participant in political seminars. He has spoken at universities and churches throughout the U.S., as well as in Afghanistan and Moscow. He also assisted in worship services at Galloway United Methodist Church in Jackson.

=== Ed King's Mississippi: Behind the Scenes of Freedom Summer ===
In 2014, King collaborated with Trent Watts on Ed King's Mississippi: Behind the Scenes of Freedom Summer, a book documenting civil rights activities in Mississippi during 1964. In addition to King's personal accounts of pivotal events in his home state, the book includes dozens of previously unpublished photographs taken by the minister, including informal images of Martin Luther King Jr., Andrew Young, and Mississippi civil rights workers.

== Death ==
King died in Jackson, Mississippi, on July 4, 2026, at the age of 89.

== In popular culture ==
King has been portrayed in several dramatic treatments of landmark events associated with the civil rights movement.

=== Play ===
King appears as a character in All the Way, a Robert Schenkkan play depicting the first year of Lyndon Johnson's presidency, with an emphasis on events surrounding the passage of the Civil Rights Act of 1964. After successful passage of the historic legislation, Johnson's bid to retain the White House in the 1964 presidential election is complicated by turmoil at the Democratic National Convention in Atlantic City, where the upstart Mississippi Freedom Democratic Party bids to unseat the all-white, official delegation that claims to represent the state.

All the Way captured the 2014 Tony Award for Outstanding Play, and Bryan Cranston, in the role of Lyndon B. Johnson, won the Tony Award for Best Actor in a Play. Ethan Phillips portrays Rev. King in a pivotal scene in which Hubert Humphrey presents the President's compromise solution that gives the renegades two at-large seats at the convention.

EDWIN KING I don't, uh, feel comfortable being the representative here in place of the grass-roots leadership. Maybe I should step aside, let Mrs. Hamer take my place.

SENATOR HUBERT HUMPHREY The President is insisting on your presence Edwin because he wants an interracial delegation!

EDWIN KING I'm sure that Mrs. Hamer has to be a part of this.

SENATOR HUBERT HUMPHREY The President has said that he will not let that illiterate woman speak on the floor of the Democratic convention.

=== Film ===
All the Way is a 2016 drama based on the historic events of 1964, the first year of the presidency of Lyndon B. Johnson. Originally broadcast on HBO, the film was directed by Jay Roach and adapted by Robert Schenkkan from his original play of the same name. Bryan Cranston reprised his role as Johnson from the 2014 Broadway production of the play. Gregory Marcel portrays King in a version of the scene from the play in which Hubert Humphrey offers the President's compromise solution to the renegade delegation.

== Awards ==
- John F. Kennedy Freedom Award, Catholic Council of Civil Liberties, 1965
- Merrill Fellowship, Harvard University, 1966
- President, ACLU of Mississippi, 1973–1977
- "Icon of the Civil Rights Movement", National Civil Rights Museum, 20th Annual Freedom Awards, 2011. The museum cited King's work with Medgar Evers in advancing civil rights in Mississippi and the South, as well his leadership of the MFDP. According to the museum, King's "outspoken and unwavering support of racial equality led to threats, violence, incarceration and often repudiation for his efforts."

== Published and unpublished works ==
- "Opening Mississippi: 1964 Freedom Summer" for Sociology Series on the 1960s, Rutgers University Press (unpublished)
- Preface, Jackson, Mississippi: An American Chronicle of Struggle and Schism, by John R. Salter Jr., Bison Books, 2011 (paperback edition, reprint)
- "Woolworth's Lunch Counter Sit-In," working draft from The Project on Lived Theology archive (unpublished)
- Ed King's Mississippi: Behind the Scenes of Freedom Summer, with Trent Watts, University Press of Mississippi, Jackson, MS, 2014

== See also ==
- Disfranchisement after the Reconstruction Era
- Sit-in movement
