= Annie Bell Robinson Devine =

American activist

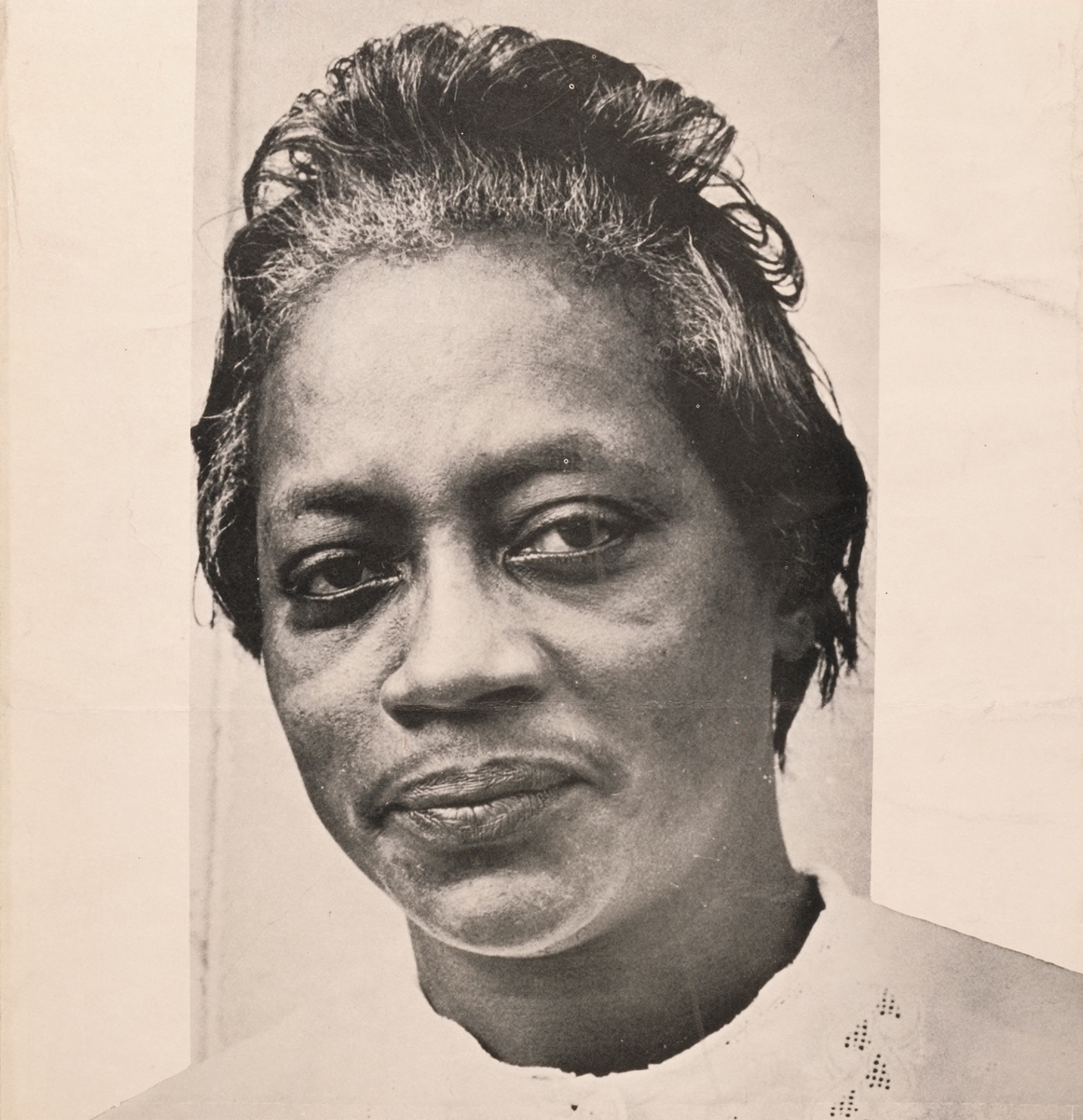
Devine c. 1964

Annie Bell Robinson Devine (1912–2000) was an American activist in the Civil Rights Movement.

== Early life ==
Born in Mobile, Alabama and raised in Canton, Mississippi, Devine attended Tougaloo College, similar to Anne Moody (also in the Civil Rights Movement). After college, Annie became an insurance agent and later a schoolteacher.

== Involvement with the movement ==
Annie Devine wasn't very interested in the Civil Rights Movement until Dave Dennis, George Raymond (NAACP) and some others started using C.O. Chinn's motel to hold NAACP meetings. She would pass by their meetings on her way home some nights, and one night she decided to join in after they moved the meetings to a church away from the city center. Annie became interested in Civil Rights after a quick encounter with a cop at that specific meeting. That very next day, Devine started canvassing for votes on the streets of Mississippi; she began meeting with other blacks in Canton to discuss civil rights issues. Eventually, Devine quit her job selling insurance to work full-time for the Congress of Racial Equality (CORE). Quickly realizing that canvassing and asking for votes wasn't making a huge dent in the movement, Annie wanted to be a part of the bigger phase two. In 1964, Devine joined Fannie Lou Hamer and Victoria Gray Adams to become the first black women to speak before the United States House of Representatives. The three were elected state representatives for the progressive Mississippi Freedom Democratic Party. Devine helped found the party, and was a member of its delegation to the 1964 Democratic National Convention in New Jersey. Upon returning from the convention, Annie decided to accept running for congresswoman of her district. She was declined by the secretary of state to have her name on the ballot. The Mississippi Freedom Democratic Party (MFDP) was also denied to run individually in the election even though they had the right number of qualified electors. Annie was then elected by freedom votes. She makes sure to state in her interview, “... very strong feeling there had to be some political force other than civil rights organizations in this state to bring about change” (Devine). Annie also had a very strong opinion about the Voting Rights bill passed by president Lyndon B. Johnson in 1965. She said, “there’s nothing in the voting bill that can really protect you. You can get registered, the federal registrar will register you, there’s some clause in there that says the FBI can see to it that you’re protected when you go down to vote, but before voting day and after voting day there’s no protection provided.. And that’s where the trouble comes in” (Devine). Mrs. Devine was set on the bigger picture of having full rights and not bits and pieces of equality.

== Freedom Summer ==
External videos
- “Interview with Annie Devine” conducted in 1985 for the Eyes on the Prize documentary in which she discusses the disappearance of James Chaney, Andrew Goodman (activist), and Michael Schwerner and the effect on other civil rights workers.

Annie Devine was heavily involved with the movement in the summer of 1964 which was named Freedom Summer. Although these few months did so much good for the moment with the main goal of getting more registered black voters in Mississippi, there were still many tragedies involving police brutality, lynchings, the Ku Klux Klan, etc. One instance which Annie relays in an interview is the murders of Chaney, Goodman, and Schwerner. At the beginning of Freedom Summer, James Chaney, Andrew Goodman, and Michael Schwerner, all taking part in the movement, disappeared. The bodies of the young three men were finally found on August 4. Annie Devine has a specific memory of this horrible occurrence and how it shaped the movement: “The, the incident, you know, where the volunteers were missing and couldn’t anybody tell what had happened to them. We, you know, you could think anything... We weren’t playing. Our organization was tight. We knew from Atlanta to Washington day by day what was happening in the communities and, I think, that, that encourage the local people to open wider their doors” (Devine). Annie explains how the movement was in its height when these young men were murdered and while it was devastating, their work became as focused as ever to prove that there would be a positive outcome.

== Bibliography ==
- Hine, Darlene; Thompson, Kathleen (1999). A Shining Thread of Hope. Broadway Books. ISBN 0-7679-0110-X.
