= Aaron Henry (politician) =

American civil rights leader and politician (1922–1997)

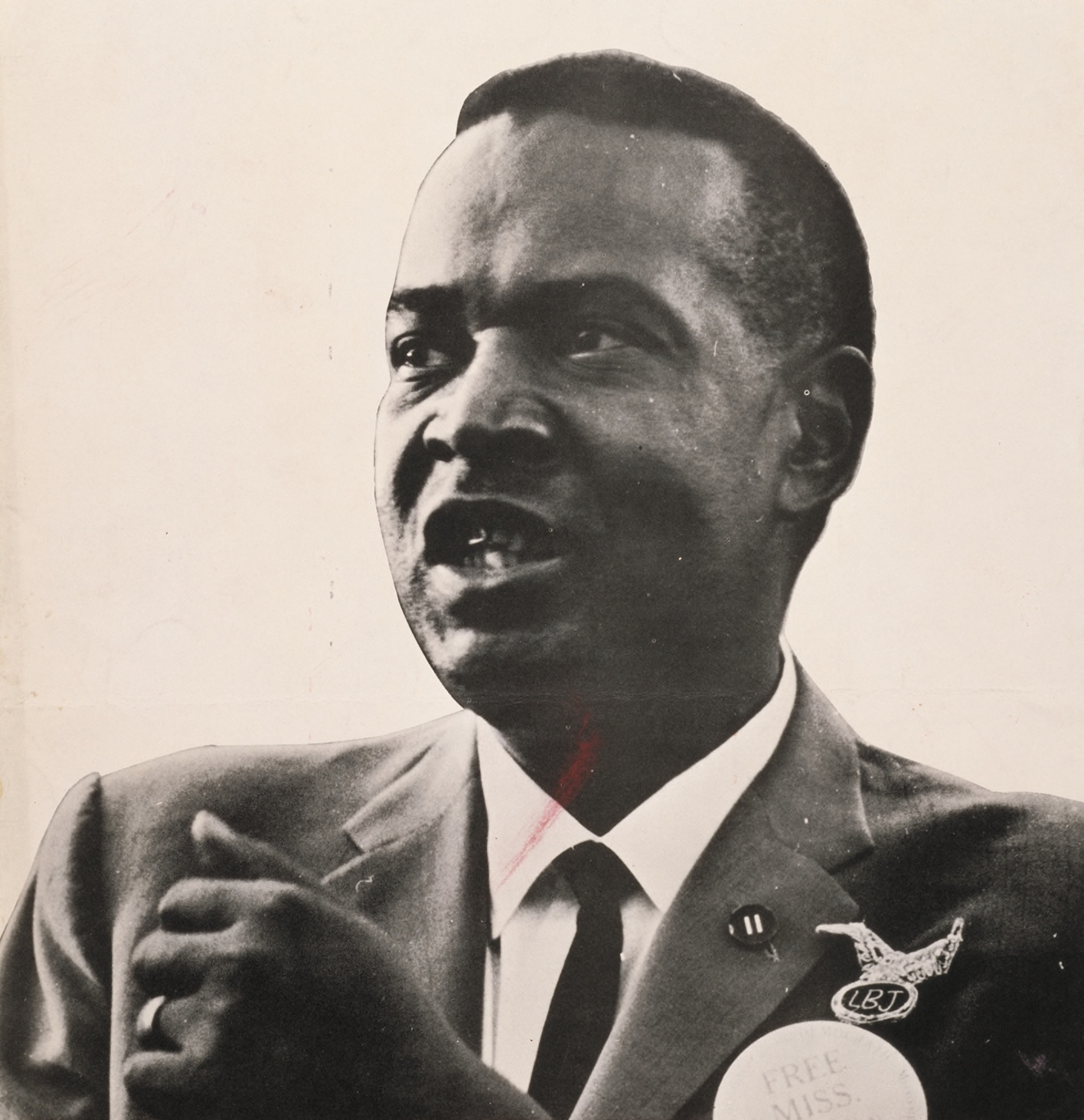
- Henry c. 1964

Member of the Mississippi House of Representatives from the Clarksdale district
- In office January 8, 1980 – January 2, 1996
- Succeeded by: Leonard Henderson

Personal details
- Born: July 2, 1922 Dublin, Mississippi, U.S.
- Died: May 19, 1997 (aged 74) Clarksdale, Mississippi, U.S.
- Party: Democratic
- Other political affiliations: Mississippi Freedom Democratic (1964–1968)
- Education: Xavier University of Louisiana
- Occupation: Civil rights leader, politician
- Known for: Civil Rights Movement; NAACP; Mississippi Freedom Democratic Party

Aaron Henry (July 2, 1922 – May 19, 1997) was an American civil rights leader, politician, and head of the Mississippi branch of the NAACP. He was one of the founders of the Mississippi Freedom Democratic Party, which tried to seat their delegation at the 1964 Democratic National Convention.

== Early life ==
Aaron Henry was born in Dublin, Mississippi to parents Ed and Mattie Henry, who worked as sharecroppers. While growing up, he worked on the Flowers brothers' plantation, which was twenty miles east of Clarksdale in Coahoma County. Henry detested everything about growing cotton because of the hardships that it brought upon the African Americans working on the plantation. Henry's parents believed education to be essential for the future of Henry and his family; they enabled him to attend the all-black Coahoma County Agricultural High School. After graduating from high school, Henry worked as a night clerk at a motel to earn money for college, but ended up enlisting in the Army. Three years in the army taught him that racial discrimination and segregation were common, many instances of which he described to Robert Penn Warren; these were used in his book Who Speaks for the Negro?. At the same time, his Army years confirmed Henry's feelings that segregation was worse in his home state. He decided that he would work for equality and justice for black Americans as soon as he returned home after the war. When he returned to Clarksdale in 1946, a Progressive Voters' League had been formed to work to implement the 1944 Supreme Court decision abolishing white primaries.

Henry noted that the Mississippi legislature had exempted returning veterans from paying the poll tax. This had been a barrier to voter registration and voting by Blacks, who were often cash poor and found it hard to pay such fees. Under the poll tax laws, a person had to have paid his poll tax for two years prior to the time that he voted. Therefore, Henry tried to get black veterans to go down to the courthouse and register to vote. However, several Black veterans were unable to register.

When Henry went to the circuit clerk's office to register, he was also rejected. The clerk asked Henry to bring a certificate showing that he was exempt from the poll tax. After he brought the certificate, the clerk said that Henry still needed to pass various tests to show that he was qualified to vote; such as a literacy or comprehension test, all administered subjectively by the clerk. After he successfully read several sections of the state constitution and passed other tests, Henry finally was able to register to vote.

He used the G.I. Bill, a law that provided educational benefits for World War II veterans, to enroll in the pharmacy school at Xavier University of Louisiana. When he graduated in 1950 with a pharmaceutical degree, he married Noelle Michael and started his own pharmacy business.

As a businessman in Clarksdale, he became involved in local and state activities, particularly events such as African-American voter registration. He decided to organize an NAACP branch in Clarksdale, and was encouraged by W.A. Higgins, an NAACP member and principal of the Black high school. A catalyst was the acquittal of two white men charged with raping two Black girls.

The NAACP national headquarters encouraged the two men to found the Mississippi chapter in Clarksdale. In 1959, Henry was elected president of the Mississippi organization, and served in the NAACP for decades. He became close friends with Medgar Evers, who had worked as a secretary for the NAACP in 1950. He continued to be active in civil rights, based in Jackson. On June 12, 1963, Evers was assassinated in his driveway at home. Henry was shocked and outraged.

== Regional Council of Negro Leadership ==
In 1951, Henry was a founding member of the Regional Council of Negro Leadership (RCNL). The main leader and head of the organization was T.R.M. Howard, a prominent black surgeon, fraternal organization leader, and entrepreneur in the all-black town of Mound Bayou, Mississippi.

The RCNL promoted a program of civil rights, voting rights, self-help, and business ownership. It sought to “reach the masses through their chosen leaders” by harnessing the talents of blacks with proven records in business, the professions, education, and the church. Henry headed the RCNL's committee on "Separate but equal," which zeroed in on the need to guarantee the "equal" in such areas as education and public facilities.

Other key members of the RCNL included Amzie Moore, an NAACP activist and gas station owner from Cleveland, Mississippi and Medgar Evers, who sold insurance for Dr. Howard in Mound Bayou. Henry aided the RCNL's boycott of service stations that failed to provide restrooms for blacks. As part of this campaign, the RCNL distributed an estimated twenty thousand bumper stickers with the slogan “Don't Buy Gas Where You Can't Use the Rest Room." Beginning in 1953, it directly challenged separate but equal policies and demanded integration of schools.

Henry participated in the RCNL's annual meetings in Mound Bayou between 1952 and 1955, which often attracted crowds of over ten thousand.

Frequently a target of racist violence, Henry was repeatedly arrested in Clarksdale. In one noted incident, the police chained him to the rear of a city garbage truck and led him through the streets of Clarksdale to jail.

== Civil rights movement activism ==
While Henry remained active in the RCNL until its demise in the early 1960s, he also joined the Mississippi branch of the NAACP in 1954. He eventually worked his way up to state president in 1959.

He started the Mississippi Freedom Democratic Party (MFDP) and the Council of Federated Organizations (COFO). In 1961 he organized a boycott of stores in the Clarksdale, Mississippi area that discriminated against African Americans both as customers and employees. He chaired delegations of Loyalist Democrats to the 1968 and 1972 Democratic National Conventions.

In 1976 the Loyalist Democrats (primarily Black) and opposing Regular Democrats of Mississippi (primarily white) agreed to reunify the state party. As part of the agreement, the party would be co-chaired by one white person and one black person until the beginning of 1980. Henry served as the black co-chairman.

In mid-20th century United States, homosexuality was widely illegal. In 1962, Henry was arrested for picking up an eighteen-year-old man from Memphis, Tennessee. By 1968, after several appeals, the charge was not voided. In 1972, he was arrested again, on charges of soliciting sodomy from two undercover policemen. Unusually for politicians of the time, Henry was able to survive such scandals in part because they originated with Whites. Blacks justifiably suspected the motives of those who brought charges, and they also recognized Henry's skill and ability as a proven leader.

== Freedom Vote campaign ==
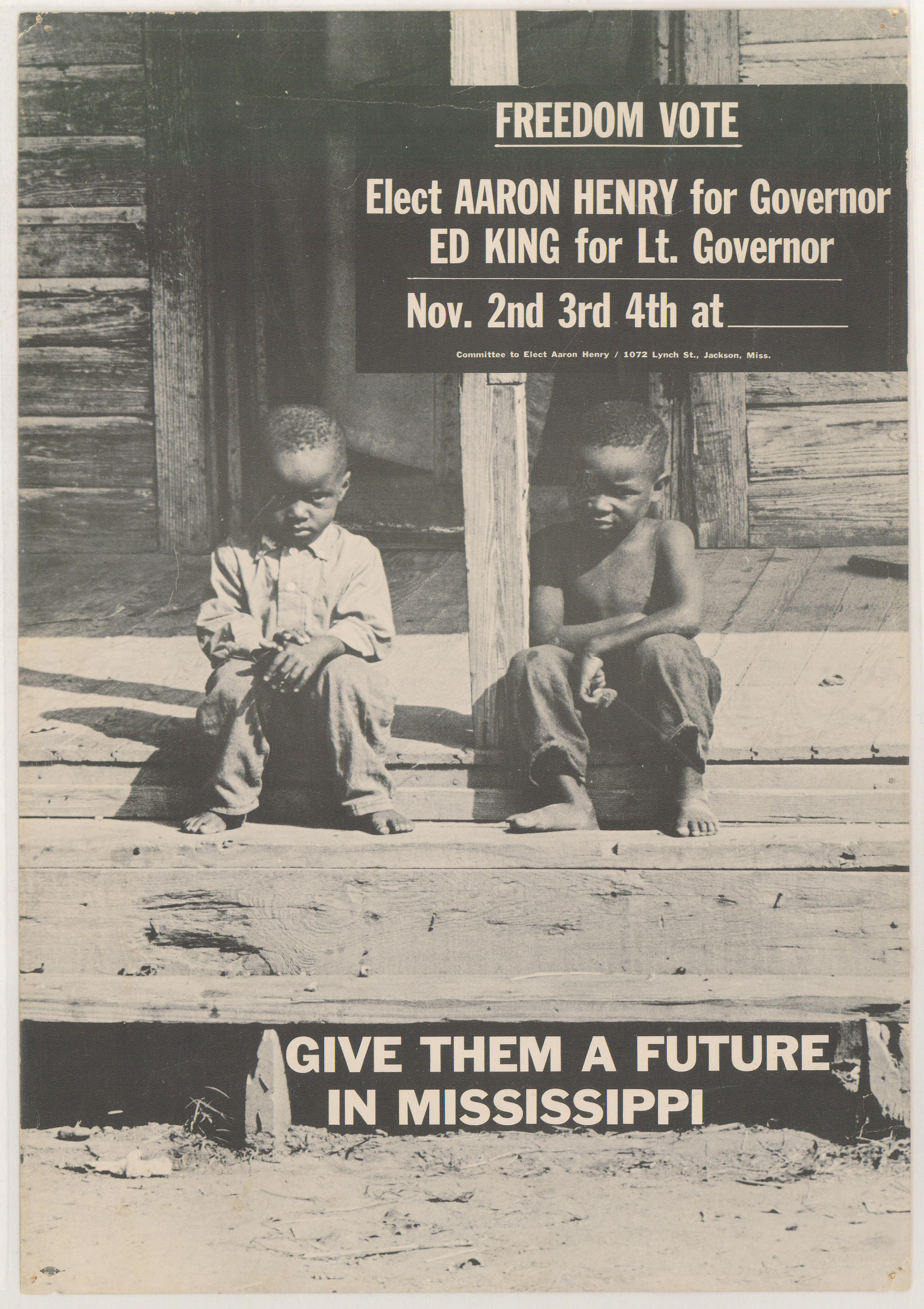
Freedom Vote broadside, 1963

While Henry served as president of COFO in 1962, he made an effort to organize the Freedom Vote, which was the mock participation in the state gubernatorial election in November 1963. Henry worked this campaign with Allard K. Lowenstein. They thought that showing black voters' willingness to vote in the mock election would make the nation realize that black Americans would participate in the electoral process if given the opportunity. (They were still largely disenfranchised in the South by a variety of discriminatory practices.)

In this mock election, Henry was the candidate for governor, and Edwin King, a white Methodist minister at Tougaloo College in Jackson, was candidate for lieutenant governor. With Bob Moses, who managed the campaign, Henry and King tried to raise awareness of how Paul B. Johnson Jr. and Rubel Phillips, who were candidates of the actual election in 1963, ignored the Freedom Vote campaign and potential strength of black Americans' will to vote.

With little experience in formal politics, Henry and King needed people who knew about political elections. At that time, Joe Lieberman, who was an editor of the Yale Daily News, was in Mississippi to work on a series of reports on the activities and programs of SNCC. Lieberman found the Freedom Vote Campaign interesting, so he spread the word at Yale about what type of help the campaign would need. After a few weeks, students from Yale, Harvard, Dartmouth, and Fordham came to help with the campaign. With their participation, the Freedom Vote Campaign gained enough awareness and was reported in a newspaper, The Free Press, by Bill Minor and R. L. T. Smith.

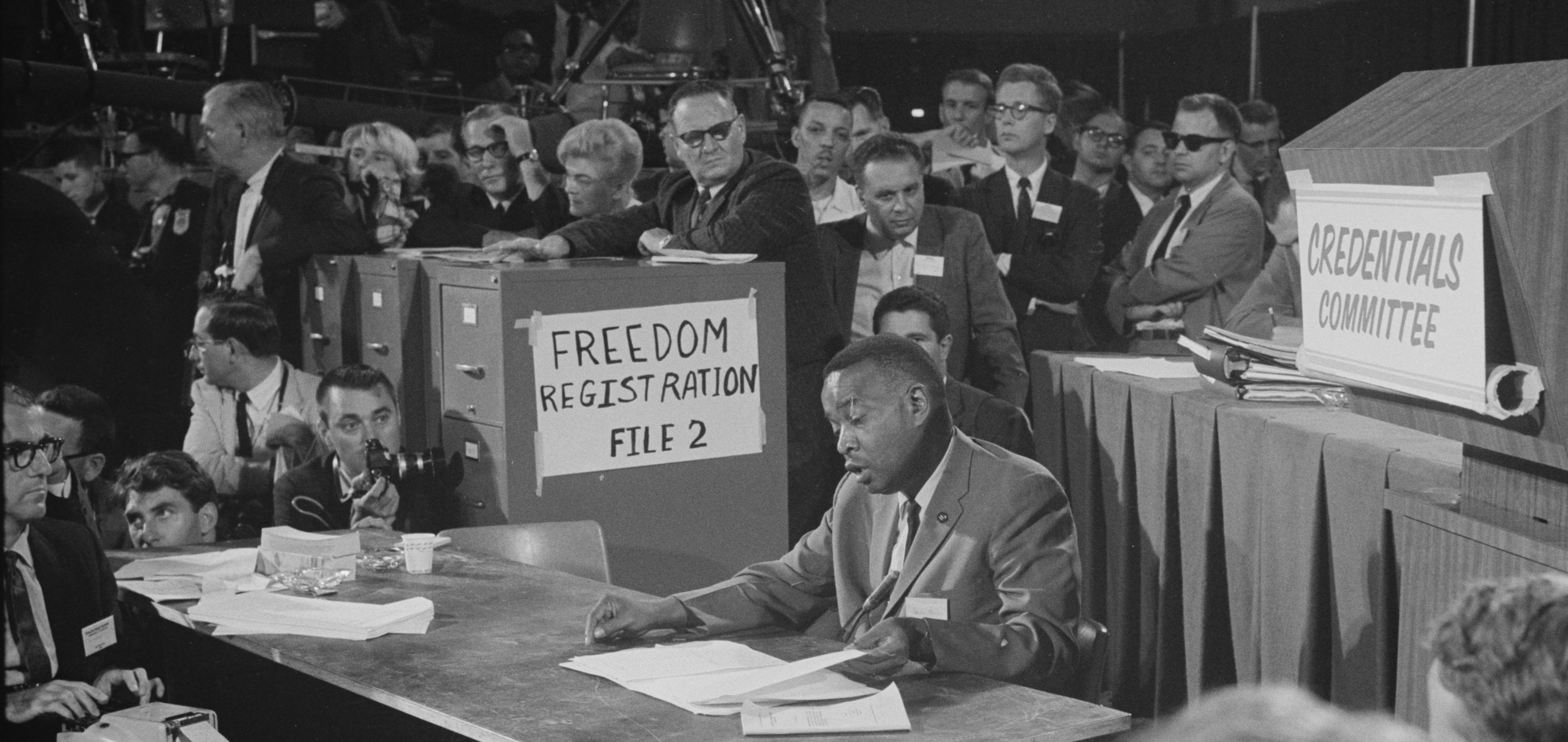
Henry reads from a document while seated before the credentials committee of the 1964 Democratic National Convention, August 22, 1964

To tabulate the result of the campaign, ballot boxes were placed in churches, business, and homes. Voting took place over a whole weekend so that many church congregations could vote at Sunday services. Although there were incidents where several voters were arrested, the campaign finished as a great success in demonstrating the willingness of African Americans to vote; more than eighty thousand people participated. Within a week of the freedom election, Lowenstein and others began to work on recruiting volunteers to aid local efforts for what would be called Freedom Summer in 1964: to educate and prepare Blacks to get through barriers and register to vote in preparation for the November Presidential election. The campaign also encouraged Paul Johnson to hint at a change in Mississippi's official line on race. After this campaign, Henry helped to create the Mississippi Freedom Democratic Party to address civil rights in Mississippi.

== Later life ==
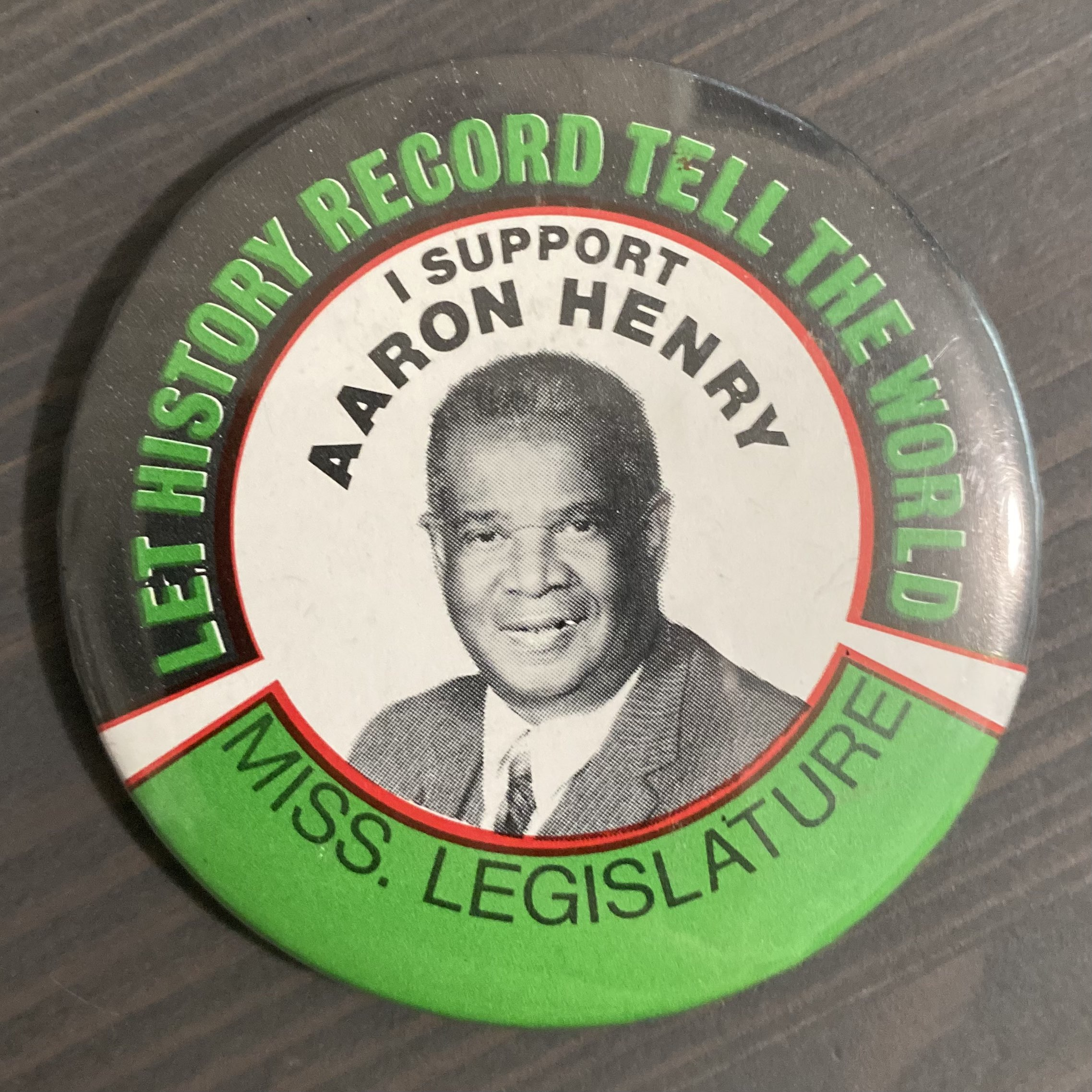
Button from Henry's time in the Mississippi State Legislature.

In 1977, U.S. Senator James Eastland, a longtime Mississippi incumbent who had historically opposed civil rights measures, approached Henry and asked if he, as state NAACP chairman, would help him in his reelection bid the following year. Somewhat surprised, Henry said he would offer assistance only if Eastland agreed to some conditions, including the hiring of a black staffer. Eastland hired Ed Cole, the 1971 gubernatorial campaign manager for Charles Evers, to work in his office, and Henry subsequently endorsed Eastland's reelection. Eastland later withdrew from the race, though he and Henry remained friends.

Henry was elected to the Mississippi House of Representatives in 1979. He was re-elected in 1983, 1987, and 1991. In August 1995, he lost a reelection bid to Leonard Henderson by a margin of 65 votes.

Following a stroke, he died in 1997 of congestive heart failure at a hospital near his home in Clarksdale.

== Works cited ==
- Nash, Jere; Taggart, Andy (2009). Mississippi Politics: The Struggle for Power, 1976-2008 (second ed.). University Press of Mississippi. ISBN 9781604733570.
