= Lawrence Guyot =

American activist (1939–2012)

- Born: July 17, 1939; Pass Christian, Mississippi, U.S.
- Died: November 23, 2012 (aged 73); Mount Rainier, Maryland, U.S.
- Education: Tougaloo College
- Occupation: Director Mississippi Freedom Democratic Party
- Organization: Mississippi Freedom Democratic Party
- Known for: Civil rights activist
- Movement: Civil Rights Movement; Peace movement
- Spouse: Monica Klein Guyot
- Children: Julie Guyot-Diangone, Lawrence Guyot III

Lawrence Guyot Jr. (July 17, 1939 – November 23, 2012) was an American civil rights activist and the director of the Mississippi Freedom Democratic Party in 1964.

== Biography ==
Guyot was a native of Pass Christian, Mississippi, where he was raised Catholic.

He joined the Freedom Movement in Mississippi in 1961, when he was a student at Tougaloo College in Mississippi. He graduated with a bachelor's degree in biology and chemistry in 1963. Guyot also directed the Congress of Racial Equality (CORE) project in Hattiesburg, Mississippi, and later became director of the Mississippi Freedom Democratic Party via the 1963 Freedom Ballot of 80,000 participants and the Summer Project of 1964. The major accomplishment of SNCC/MFDP was to establish a close bond with the United States Department of Justice. In 1966, Guyot ran for Congress as an anti-war candidate.

Guyot was severely physically beaten many times, including while at the Mississippi State Penitentiary, also known as Parchman Farm, in the early 1960s. He has stated that his testicles were burned with sticks by police officers.

Guyot helped lay the groundwork for the Voting Rights Act of 1965. He received a degree in law in 1971 from Rutgers University, and then moved to Washington, D.C., where he worked for the election of Marion Barry as mayor in 1978.

Muhammad Ali, the world boxing champion, was a good friend of Lawrence Guyot.

Guyot has appeared in many documentaries such as Eyes on the Prize, released in 1987. From the 1990s until the mid-2000s, Guyot often appeared as a commentator on Fox News, defending the legacy of the civil rights movement in heated discussions with hosts Bill O'Reilly and Sean Hannity. He continued speaking out on voting rights issues and encouraged people to vote for President Barack Obama. Until his retirement in 2004, Guyot was a program monitor for the D.C. Department of Human Services' Office of Early Childhood Development.

His daughter Julie Guyot-Diangone announced on November 24, 2012, that her father had died at home, in Mount Rainier, Maryland. She said he had had heart problems and had suffered from diabetes.
