= Mississippi Freedom Democratic Party =

Branch of Freedom Democrat party during 1960s Civil Rights Movement

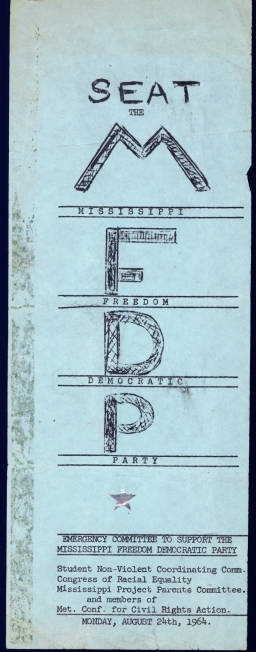
- Chairperson: Lawrence Guyot
- Vice Chairperson: Fannie Lou Hamer
- Founded: 1964
- Dissolved: 1968
- Split from: Mississippi Democratic Party
- Merged into: Mississippi Democratic Party
- Headquarters: Jackson, Mississippi
- Ideology: Civil Rights; Desegregation; Liberalism; Social liberalism Progressivism
- Political position: Center-left
- National affiliation: Democratic Party
- Colors: Blue

The Mississippi Freedom Democratic Party (MFDP), also referred to simply as the Freedom Democratic Party, was an American political party that existed in the state of Mississippi from 1964 to 1968 during the Civil Rights Movement. Created as the partisan political branch of the Freedom Democrat organization (a contemporary Civil Rights activist group aligned with the national United States Democratic Party), the party was organized by African Americans and White Americans from Mississippi who were sympathetic to the Civil Rights Movement.

== Origins ==
In Mississippi, African Americans were restricted from registering and voting by means of intimidation, harassment, terror, and literacy tests. They had been limited from participation in the political system since 1890 by passage that year of a new state constitution, and by the practices of the governing white Democrats in the decades since, with participation in the state Democratic Party limited to whites. Starting in 1961, the Student Nonviolent Coordinating Committee (SNCC) and Council of Federated Organizations (COFO) had implemented campaigns to register black voters.

In June 1963, African Americans attempted to cast votes in the Mississippi primary election but were prevented from doing so. This contest to determine Democratic candidates was essentially the only competitive race, as the state was a de facto one-party jurisdiction under the control of the Mississippi Democratic Party. Unable to vote in the official election, an alternative "Freedom Ballot" was organized to take place at the same time as the scheduled November voting. With this election seen as a protest action to dramatize the denial of their constitutional voting rights, close to 80,000 people cast freedom ballots for an integrated slate of candidates. In response, James W. Wright, Fannie Lou Hamer, Ella Baker, and Bob Moses, founded the Mississippi Freedom Democratic Party in 1964. As a result, they encountered violent opposition that included activists being intimidated with church, home, and business burnings and bombings, beatings, and arrests.

== Building the party ==
With partial participation in the regular Mississippi Democratic Party blocked by segregationists, the COFO built on the success of the Freedom Ballot by formally establishing the MFDP in April 1964 as a non-discriminatory, non-exclusionary rival to the regular party organization. The MFDP hoped to become the officially recognized Democratic Party organization in Mississippi by winning the Mississippi seats at the 1964 Democratic National Convention for a slate of delegates elected by some black and white Mississippians.

Building the MFDP was a major thrust of the Freedom Summer project. After it proved to be impossible to register black voters against the opposition of state officials, Freedom Summer volunteers switched to building the MFDP using a simple, alternate process of signing up party supporters. This new process did not require people to take unfair literacy tests or to register for voting at the courthouse in public opposition to existing power structures.

By the end of August 1964, the Mississippi Freedom Democratic Party had gained so much attention nationally that its delegates had 80,000 members belonging to their racially integrated party.

In time, some activists from the Northeast, including some of the Freedom Riders, would come to dominate the administration of the new party.

== State Convention in Jackson, Mississippi ==
On August 4, before the state convention, the bodies of James Chaney, Michael Schwerner and Andrew Goodman were discovered buried in an earthen dam. They had been workers with the Congress of Racial Equality (CORE), registering people to vote for the MFDP, and had been murdered for their activism. Missing for weeks since disappearing after investigating a church burning in June 1964, they were subjects of a massive manhunt that involved the FBI and United States sailors from a nearby base. The murders drew national attention and generated outrage, emboldening the MFDP to be the party to represent the state of Mississippi.

On August 6, 1964, the MFDP held a statewide convention before attending the DNC; 2,500 people showed up at the Masonic Temple. They decided to take the party to the national credentials committee and attempt to be seated as the delegation from Mississippi. Joseph Rauh, the MFDP legal counsel and a foremost civil liberties attorney, spoke at the convention. He said that the MFDP was the only party in the state loyal to the national Democratic Party and that its chances of success were excellent.

Ella Baker was the keynote speaker at the state convention. She did not deliver the kind of address that the people were expecting on voting and rights but made a statement about society:

I'm not trying to make you feel good. We have to know what we are dealing with and we can't deal with things just because we feel we ought to have our rights. We have to deal with them on the basis of knowledge that we gain ... through sending our children through certain kinds of courses, through sitting down and reading at night instead of spending our time at the television and radio just listening to what's on. But we must spend our time reading some of things that help us to understand this South we live in.

The state convention gave the MFDP confidence in their ability to effect change on the national level. They elected Fannie Lou Hamer, E.W. Steptoe, Winson Hudson, Hazel Palmer, Victoria Gray, Rev. Ed King, Aaron Henry and Annie Devine as electors from the state to the national convention. The day after the state convention, James Chaney was buried in his hometown of Meridian, Mississippi. Dave Dennis gave an impassioned speech about the loss of this young man.

Those are the people who don't care. ... That includes the President on down to the governor of the state of Mississippi ... I blame the people in Washington D.C., and on down in the state of Mississippi for what happened just as much as I blame those who pulled the trigger. ... He's got his freedom, and we're still fighting for ours.

In the face of unrelenting violence and economic retaliation by the White Citizens Council, the Mississippi State Sovereignty Commission, and other opponents, the MFDP held local caucuses, county assemblies, and a statewide convention (as prescribed by Democratic Party rules) to elect 68 delegates (including four whites) to the 1964 Democratic National Convention scheduled for Atlantic City, New Jersey in August.

== 1964 Democratic National Convention ==
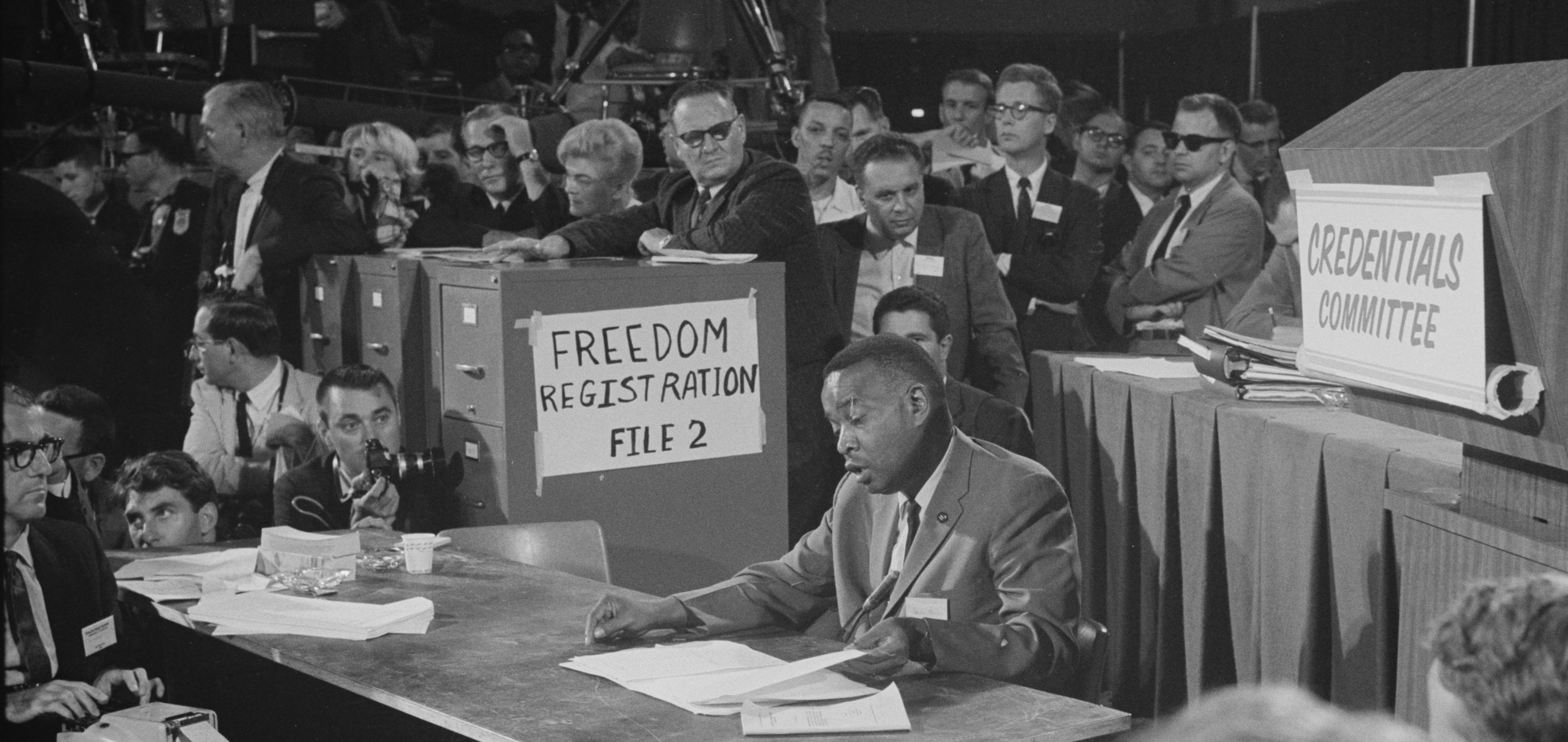
Aaron Henry reading from a document while seated before the credentials committee

The MFDP sent its elected delegates by bus to the convention. They challenged the right of the Mississippi Democratic Party's delegation to participate in the convention, claiming that the regulars had been illegally elected in a completely segregated process that violated both party regulations and federal law, and that the regulars had no intention to support President Lyndon B. Johnson, the party's candidate, in the November election. They asked that the MFDP delegates be seated rather than the segregationist regulars.

Some of the original members of the Mississippi Freedom Democratic Party delegation in 1964 were Lawrence Guyot, Peggy J. Conner, Victoria Gray, Edwin King, Aaron Henry, James W. Wright, Fannie Lou Hamer, Annie Devine, and Bob Moses.

Martin Luther King told President Johnson that he would "do everything in my power to urge (The MFDP) being seated as the only democratically constituted delegation from Mississippi." King also voiced his support to Congress, "I pledge myself and the Southern Christian Leadership Conference to the fullest support of the challenges of the Mississippi Freedom Democratic party and call upon all Americans to join with me in this commitment."

The Democratic Party referred the challenge to the convention credentials committee. The MFDP delegates lobbied and argued their case, and large groups of supporters and volunteers established an around-the-clock picket line on the boardwalk just outside the convention. The MFDP prepared a legal brief detailing the reasons why the "regular" Mississippi delegation did not adequately represent their state's residents, including the tactics employed to exclude participation by Black citizens. Jack Minnis wrote, "MFDP, with the help of SNCC, produced brochures, mimeographed biographies of the MFDP delegates, histories of the MFDP, legal arguments, historical arguments, moral arguments" that were distributed to all of the convention's delegates. Their actions attracted considerable publicity.

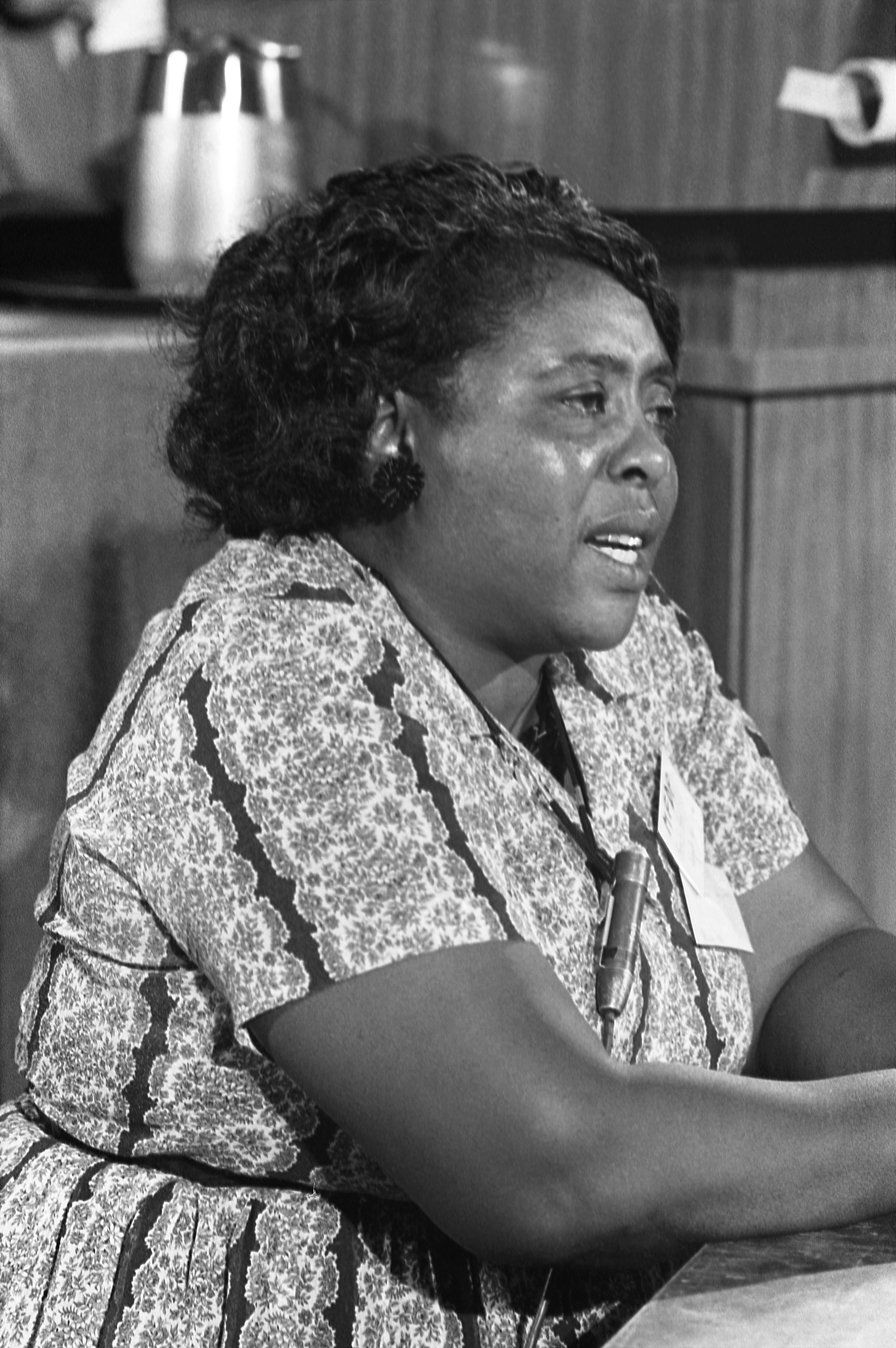
Fannie Lou Hamer, mid-speech to the credentials committee

The credentials committee televised its proceedings, which allowed the nation to see and hear the testimony of the MFDP delegates, particularly the testimony of Fannie Lou Hamer. She gave a moving and evocative portrayal of her hard brutalized life as a sharecropper on a cotton plantation in the Mississippi Delta and the retaliation inflicted on her for trying to register to vote.

After that, most knowledgeable observers thought the majority of the delegates were ready to unseat the regulars and seat the MFDP delegates in their place. But some of the all-white delegations from other southern states threatened to leave the convention and bolt the party (as they had done in previous years) if the regular Mississippi delegation was unseated. President Johnson had wanted a convention stressing unity and feared losing Southern support in the coming campaign against Republican Party candidate Barry Goldwater. To ensure his victory in November, Johnson maneuvered to prevent the MFDP from replacing the regulars. After a frantic scramble, he ordered the chairman of the credentials committee to avoid deciding the matter or sending the issue to the convention.

With the help of Senator Hubert Humphrey (a potential candidate for vice president) and Party leader Walter Mondale, Johnson engineered a "compromise" in which the national Democratic Party offered the MFDP two at-large seats, rather than replacing the regular Democratic delegates from their state. This allowed them to watch the floor proceedings but not take part. The MFDP refused this "compromise", which permitted the white-only regulars, who had not been democratically elected, to keep their seats and denied votes to the MFDP.

MFDP leader and Mississippi NAACP President Aaron Henry stated:

Now, Lyndon made the typical white man's mistake: Not only did he say, 'You've got two votes,' which was too little, but he told us to whom the two votes would go. He'd give me one and Ed King one; that would satisfy. But, you see, he didn't realize that sixty-four of us came up from Mississippi on a Greyhound bus, eating cheese and crackers and bologna all the way there; we didn't have no money. Suffering the same way. We got to Atlantic City; we put up in a little hotel, three or four of us in a bed, four or five of us on the floor. You know, we suffered a common kind of experience, the whole thing. But now, what kind of fool am I, or what kind of fool would Ed have been, to accept gratuities for ourselves? You say, Ed and Aaron can get in but the other sixty-two can't. This is typical white man picking black folks' leaders, and that day is just gone.

The MFDP was willing to accept a compromise proposed by Oregon Congresswoman Edith Green, that "loyal" Democrats of both delegations be seated. This compromise was not accepted by the national party, which instead selected the "regular" party to represent the state of Mississippi, those who, on July 28, 1964, had passed the following resolution:

We opposed, condemn and deplore the Civil Rights Act of 1964 ... We believe in separation of the races in all phases of our society. It is our belief that the separation of the races is necessary for the peace and tranquility of all the people of Mississippi and the continuing good relationship which has existed over the years ...

The MFDP left the Convention rather than be compromised by accepting the two seats. President Johnson had tried to prevent Fannie Lou Hamer from making her speech. After the United States heard her speech, different parts of the population were outraged and began calling into the White House seeking justice for African Americans in the South. The next year President Johnson persuaded Congress to pass the Voting Rights Act of 1965, which authorized the federal government to oversee elections at the state and local level, and enforce practices that would support legitimate voter registration and voting in areas with an historic under-representation of certain parts of the population.

Fannie Lou Hamer said, "We didn't come all this way for no two seats, 'cause all of us is tired." Although denied official recognition, the MFDP kept up their agitation within the convention. When all but three of the regular Mississippi delegates left because they refused to support Johnson against Goldwater, the Republican Party candidate, the MFDP delegates borrowed passes from sympathetic northern delegates and took the vacated seats. The national Party would not allow them to stay. The next day the MFDP delegates returned to discover that convention organizers had removed the empty seats; they stayed to sing freedom songs.

Johnson lost Mississippi in the 1964 presidential election, as whites had still suppressed the black vote. White Democrats were becoming more conservative and voted for Goldwater. With the exception of the 1976 presidential election, when favorite son Jimmy Carter of Georgia was the Democratic candidate, Mississippi has never voted for the Democratic presidential candidate since.

== Aftermath ==
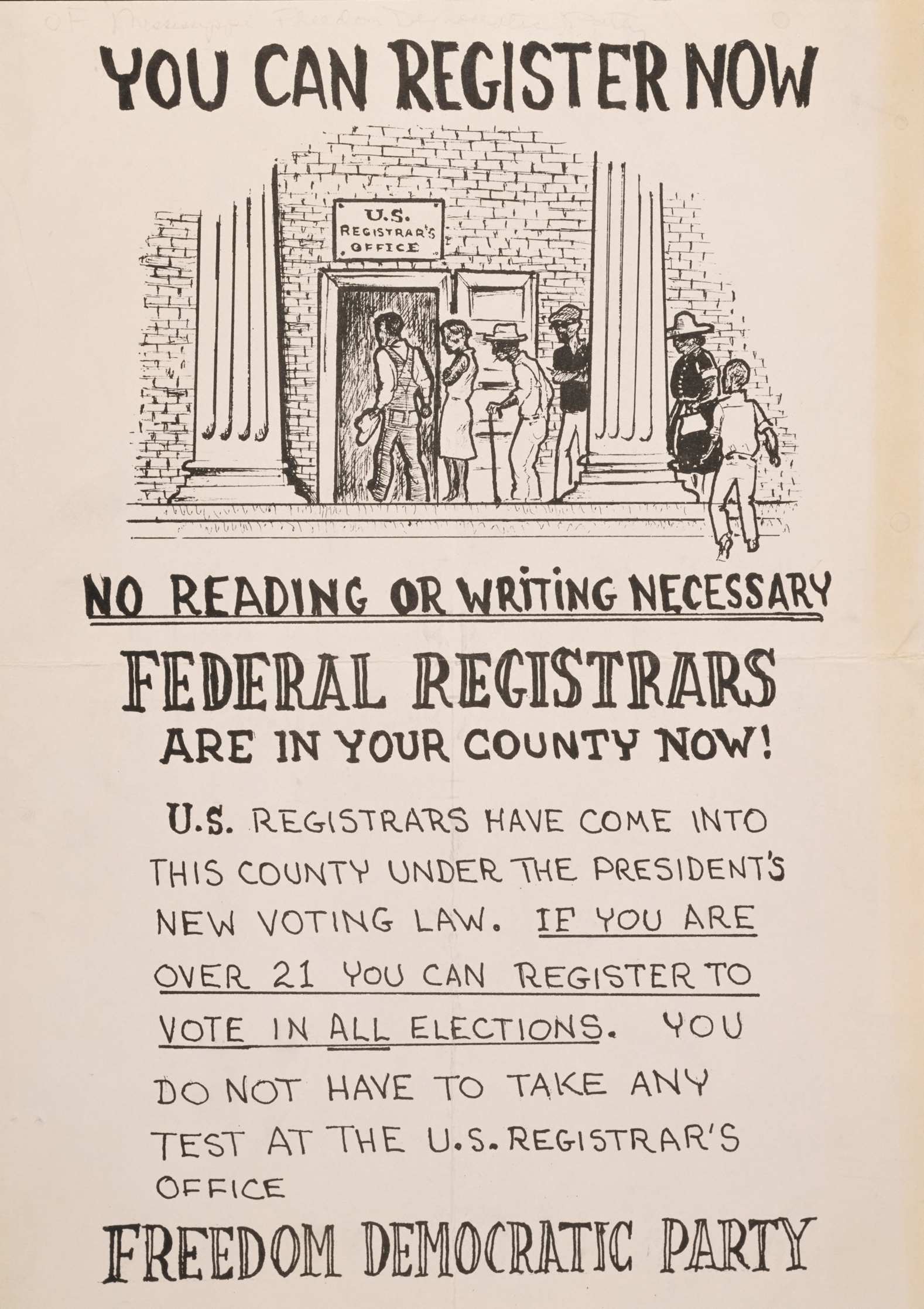
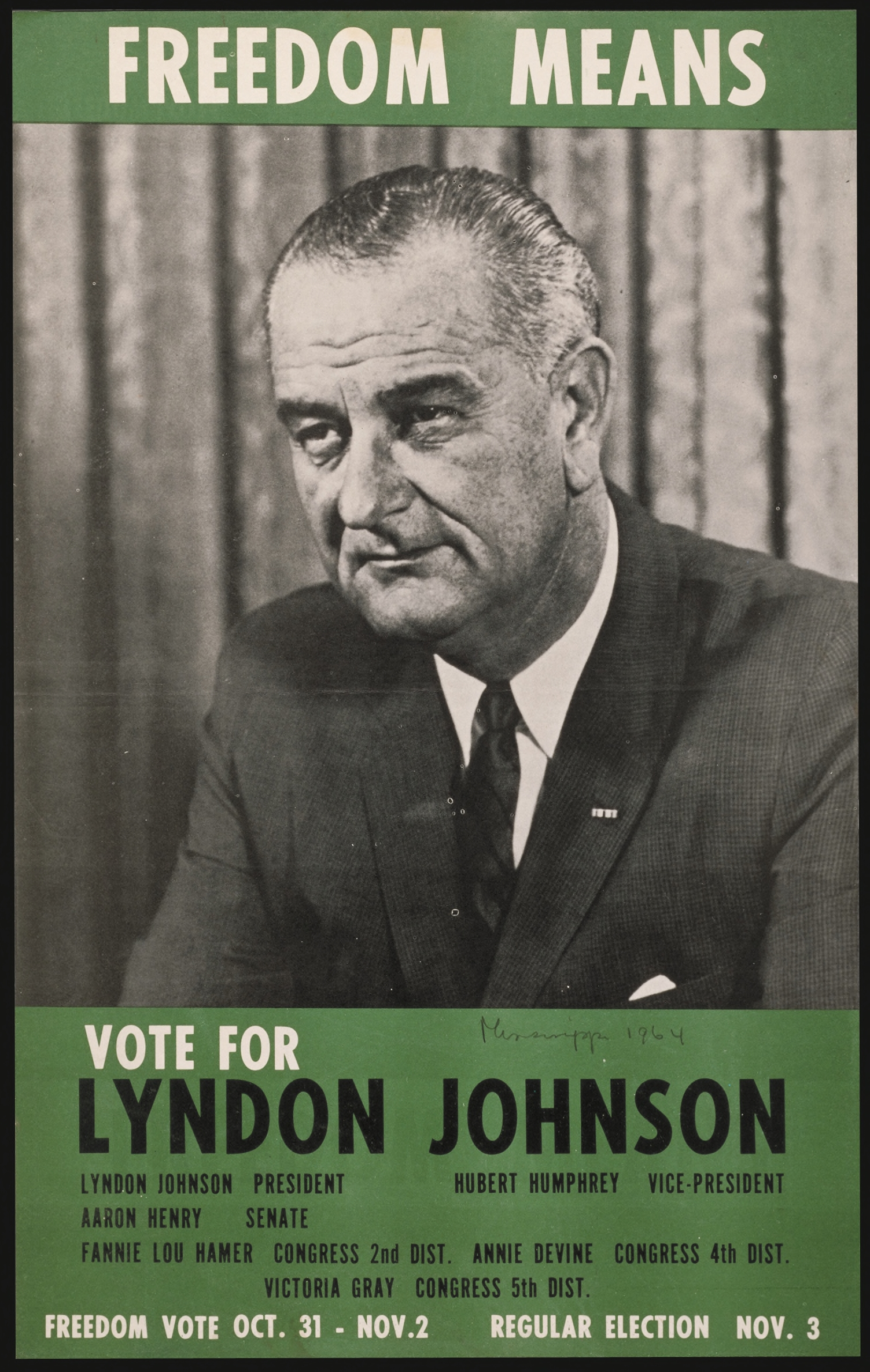
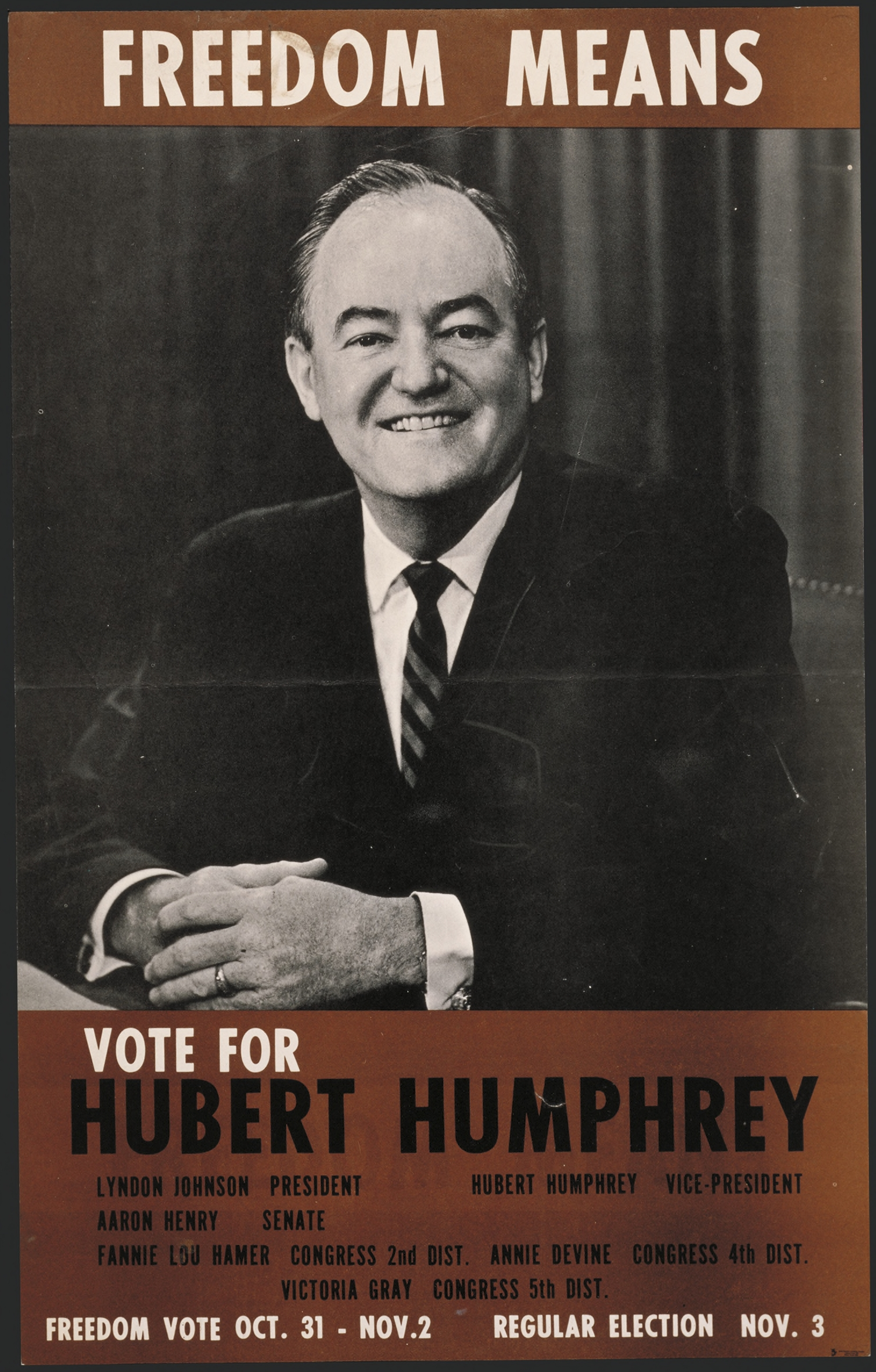
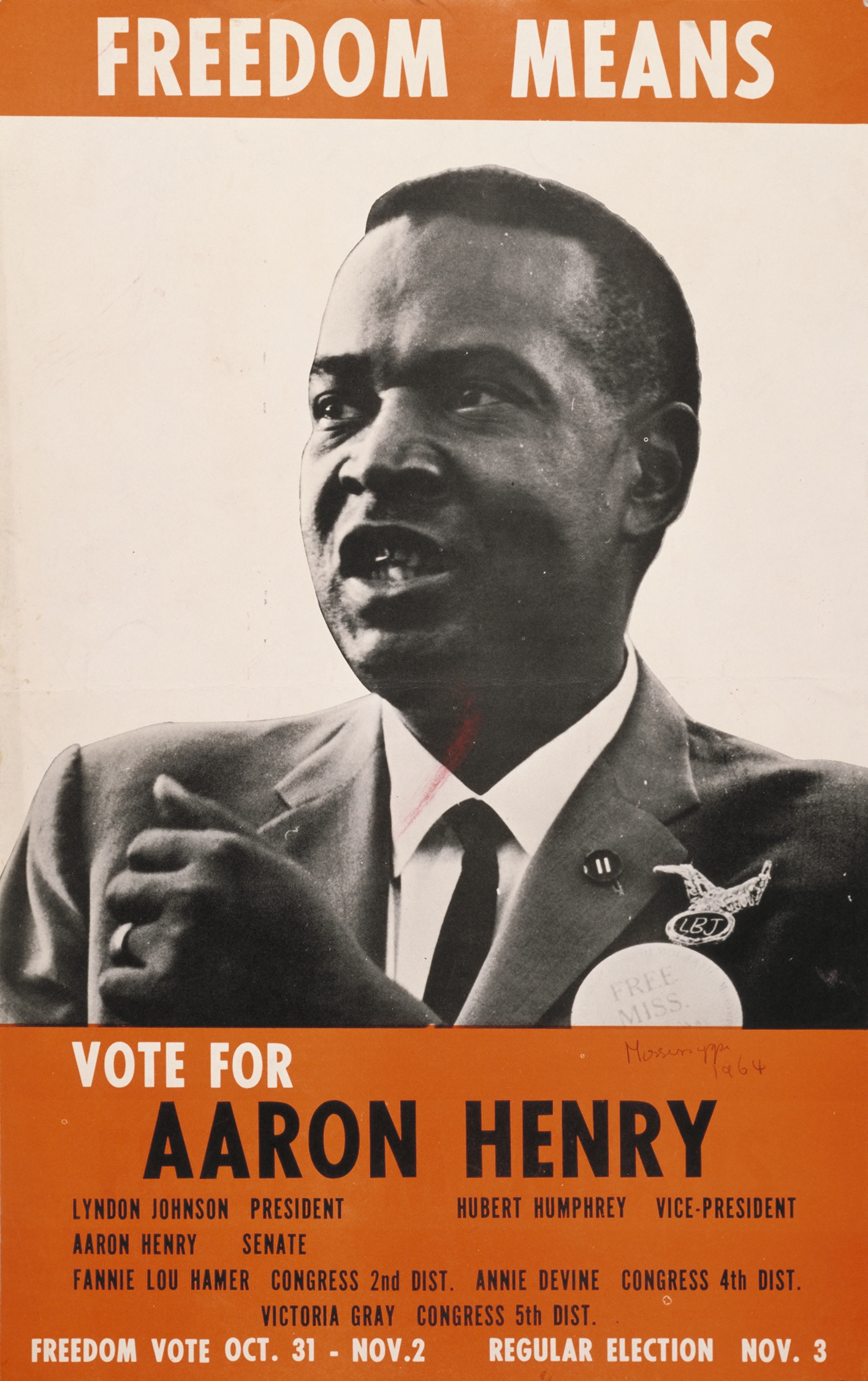
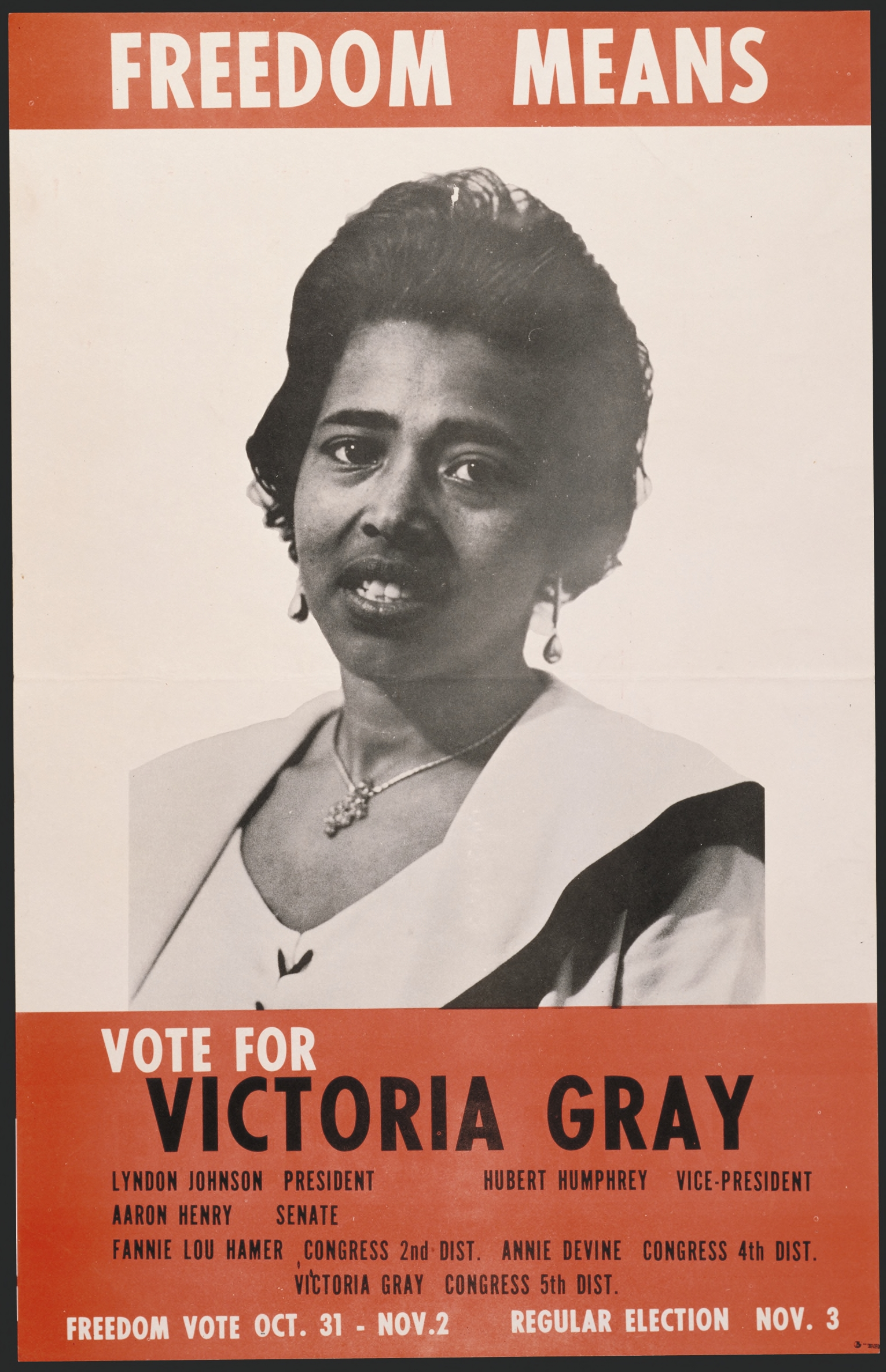
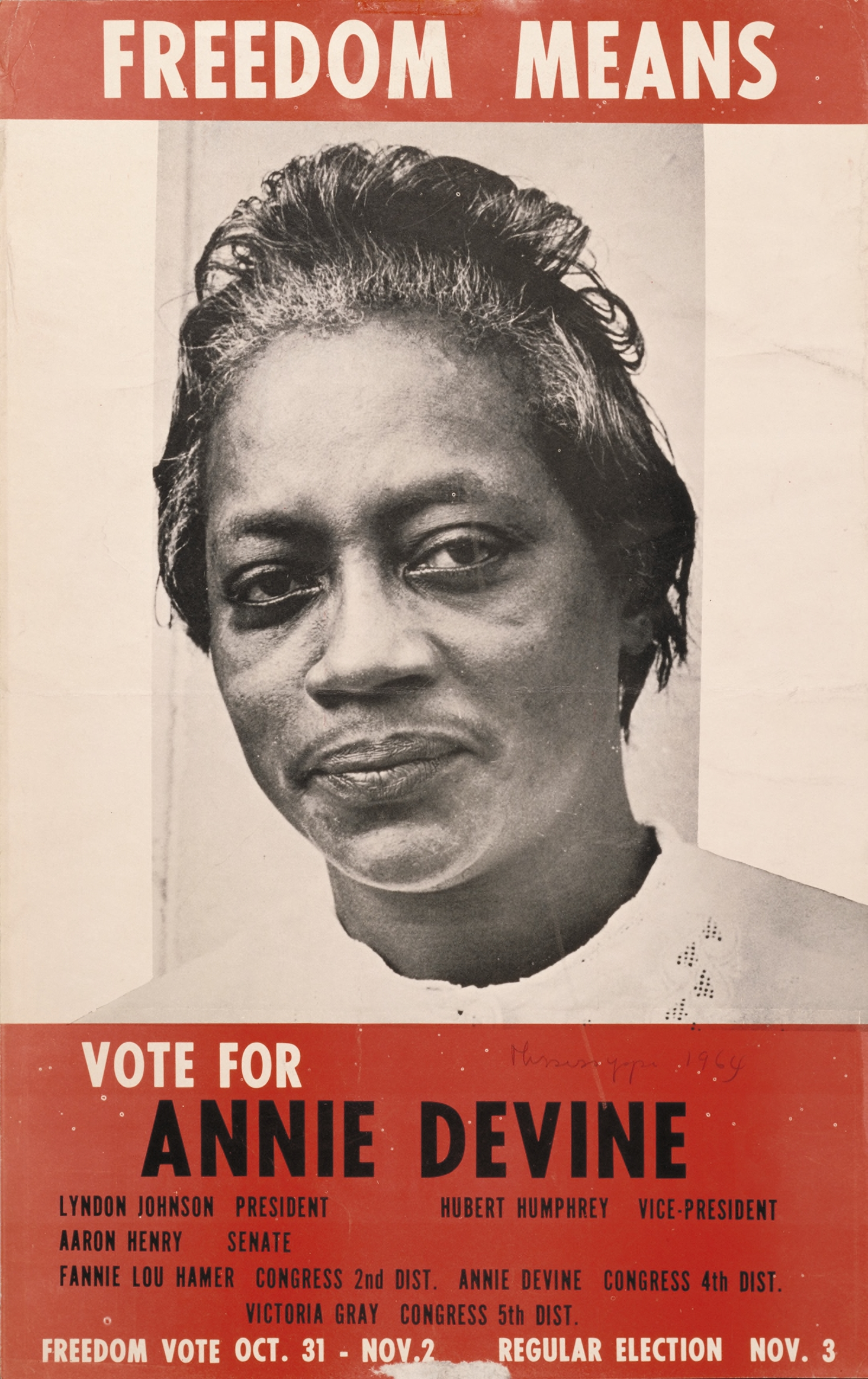
Various MFDP campaign posters from the 1964 election featuring, clockwise from top left:
- Information on the Civil Rights Act of 1964, Lyndon B. Johnson, and Hubert Humphrey
- Annie Devine, Victoria Gray, and Aaron Henry

The 1964 Democratic Party convention disillusioned many within the MFDP. For a while, it became more radical after Atlantic City. It invited Malcolm X to speak and opposed the war in Vietnam.

For the better part of a year after hosting the statewide mock election in November 1963, most of the organization's efforts went into challenging the seating of the elected congresspersons of Mississippi to the U.S. House of Representatives. They argued to Congress that, because of the state's disfranchisement, half of the electorate was prevented from participating in the election of those representatives. The FDP had 149 votes in Congress supporting its position; however, the House leadership (dominated by senior Southern Democrats) and Johnson's White House were appalled at this idea and rejected overturning the Democratic representatives from Mississippi.

Many Civil Rights Movement activists felt betrayed by Johnson, Humphrey, and the liberal establishment. The movement had been promised that if it concentrated on voter registration rather than protests, it would be supported by the federal government and the liberal wing of the Democratic Party. Instead, at the decisive moment, they believed that black civil rights and justice had been sacrificed for the political interests of white politicians. As SNCC Chairman John Lewis later wrote:

As far as I'm concerned, this was the turning point of the civil rights movement. I'm absolutely convinced of that. Until then, despite every setback and disappointment and obstacle we had faced over the years, the belief still prevailed that the system would work, the system would listen, the system would respond. Now, for the first time, we had made our way to the very center of the system. We had played by the rules, done everything we were supposed to do, had played the game exactly as required, had arrived at the doorstep and found the door slammed in our face.

Though the MFDP failed to unseat the regulars at the convention, they did succeed in publicizing the violence and injustice by which the white power structure governed Mississippi and disenfranchised black citizens. The dramatic elements of the MFDP and its convention challenge eventually helped gain congressional passage of the Voting Rights Act of 1965.

The MFDP actions resulted in the national party adopting a new policy: its credentials committee banned seating delegations that had been chosen through racial discrimination. The MFDP continued as an alternate for several years as African Americans began to register and vote in the regular political system. Many of the people associated with it continued to press to implement civil rights in Mississippi. After passage of the Voting Rights Act, the number of registered black voters in Mississippi grew dramatically. The regular party stopped discriminating against blacks and agreed to conform to the Democratic Party rules guaranteeing fair participation. Eventually, the MFDP merged into the regular party and many MFDP activists became party leaders. The FDP has only one active chapter, in Holmes County.

After the MFDP was disbanded, many formed a new party, the Loyal Democrats of Mississippi. In 1968, they were successful at the DNC in being seated as the only delegation from Mississippi. Several of these delegates were members of the MFDP.

Militants, including John Buffington (S. N. C. C. (Student Nonviolent Coordinating Committee) field worker in Clay County, chairman of the Clay County Community Development Organization and member of the Mississippi Freedom Democratic Party) and Rudy A. Shields (S. N. C. C. (Student Nonviolent Coordinating Committee) field worker in Copiah County), challenged the white Mississippi power structure, economically and electorally. They were charged with the firebombing of the office of the Clay County Community Development Organization on 24 January 1970. The next day, dynamite exploded the Clay County Courthouse. A grand jury declined to indict them. Several months later, one of the militants, John Thomas Jr., was assassinated in broad daylight, and the accused killer was found not guilty, claiming self-defense.

== See also ==
- National Democratic Party of Alabama
- Progressive Democratic Party (South Carolina)
- Vicksburg Citizens' Appeal
