= Freedom Vote =

Mock election

- Part of the Civil Rights Movement
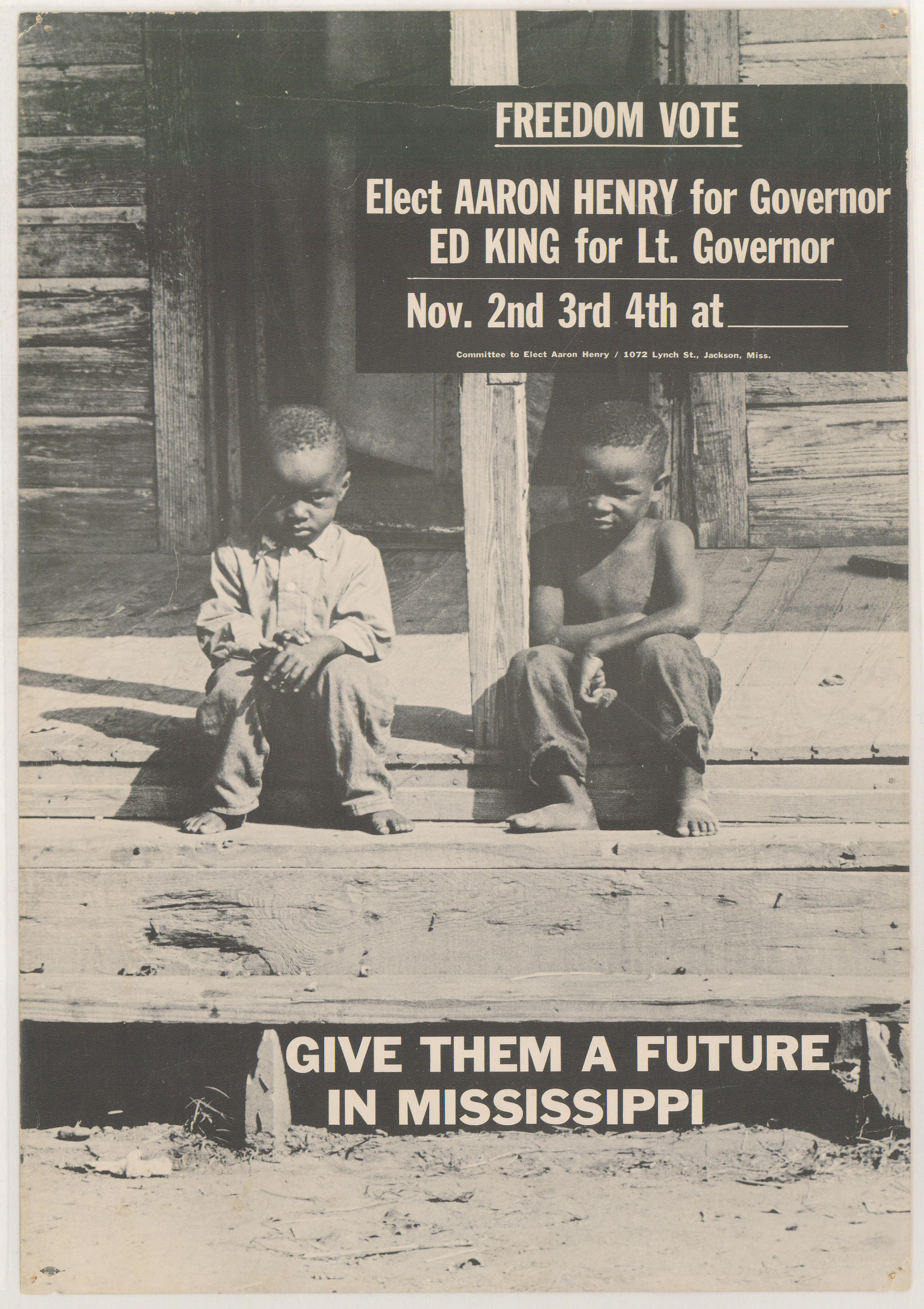
- Freedom Vote broadside
- Date: 1963
- Location: Mississippi
- Caused by: Disenfranchisement of African-Americans in Mississippi
- Result: Submission of 78,869 ballots Creation of Freedom Summer Establishment of Mississippi Freedom Democratic Party

The Freedom Vote, also known as the Freedom Ballot, Mississippi Freedom Vote, Freedom Ballot Campaign, or the Mississippi Freedom Ballot, was a 1963 mock election organized in the U.S. state of Mississippi to combat disenfranchisement among African Americans. The effort was organized by the Council of Federated Organizations (COFO), a coalition of Mississippi's four most prominent civil rights organizations, with the Student Nonviolent Coordinating Committee (SNCC) taking a leading role. By the end of the campaign, over 78,000 Mississippians had participated. The Freedom Vote directly led to the creation of the Mississippi Freedom Democratic Party (MFDP).

== Background ==
In addition to a poll tax, the Mississippi voting registration procedure in 1963 required Mississippians to fill out a 21-question registration form and to answer, to the satisfaction of the white registrars, a question on the interpretation of any one of the 285 sections of the state's constitution. As a result, African-Americans made up a large portion of the voting-age population, yet only a small fraction of them were registered; in Mississippi's 2nd Congressional District, despite making up more than half of the total adult population, fewer than 3% of eligible black voters were registered. Statewide, between 5% and 6% of eligible blacks were registered to vote.

== Freedom Vote ==
On October 6, 1963, a convention at the Masonic Temple in Jackson nominated Clarksdale, Mississippi, pharmacist and NAACP leader Aaron Henry for governor, and activist Edwin King for lieutenant governor. It was the first black-white integrated ticket for state leadership of Mississippi since the Reconstruction era. From October 14 to November 4, volunteers worked to spread information about the Freedom Vote as widely as possible amongst voters.

Beginning on November 2, polling stations set up in barber shops, churches, drug stores in black neighborhoods and began accepting ballots. When polling concluded on November 4, 78,869 ballots had been submitted by blacks across Mississippi, four times the number of blacks registered to vote.

== Impact ==
The Freedom Vote accomplished four goals: It protested the exclusion of blacks by the Mississippi Democratic Party, educated black Mississippians about how to register and vote, proved that black Mississippians were interested in voting and interested in change, and helped attract the attention of the federal administration to the fact that voting rights were being violated in Mississippi.

== See also ==
- Disfranchisement after the Reconstruction Era
- Poll taxes in the United States
