= Voter Education Project =

Organization aimed at registering minority voters

The Voter Education Project (VEP) raised and distributed foundation funds to civil rights organizations for voter education and registration work in the southern United States from 1962 to 1992. The project was federally endorsed by the Kennedy administration in hopes that the organizations of the ongoing civil rights movement would shift their focus away from demonstrations and more towards the support of voter registration.

== Background ==
Starting in 1960, the explosion of student-led activism of sit-ins and Freedom Rides during the civil rights movement created a public relations and foreign policy embarrassment for the Kennedy administration. In the early 1960s, Asian and African nations were liberating themselves from generations of racist colonial rule, and both the U.S. and Soviet Union were fiercely competing with each other in a Cold War struggle for the support of these new nations. The worldwide news stories, photos, and TV images of racist brutality, burning buses, and police suppression of Black civil rights undercut the State Department's effort to convince Asian and African nations to align themselves with Free World camp in international affairs.

== Founding ==
Believing that the flood of negative news stories about race-relations in America were caused by the wave of student protests, President John F. Kennedy and Attorney General Robert F. Kennedy urged civil rights leaders and organizations to engage in voter registration rather than nonviolent direct-action demonstrations. Unofficially, they convinced several non-profit foundations to fund voter registration work in the South. The Taconic, Field, New World, and Stern Family foundations agreed to contribute significant funds. To raise, administer, and distribute the money, the NAACP, Congress of Racial Equality, Southern Christian Leadership Conference (SCLC), and Student Nonviolent Coordinating Committee formed the Voter Education Project (VEP) under the auspices of the non-profit Southern Regional Council.

== Activities ==
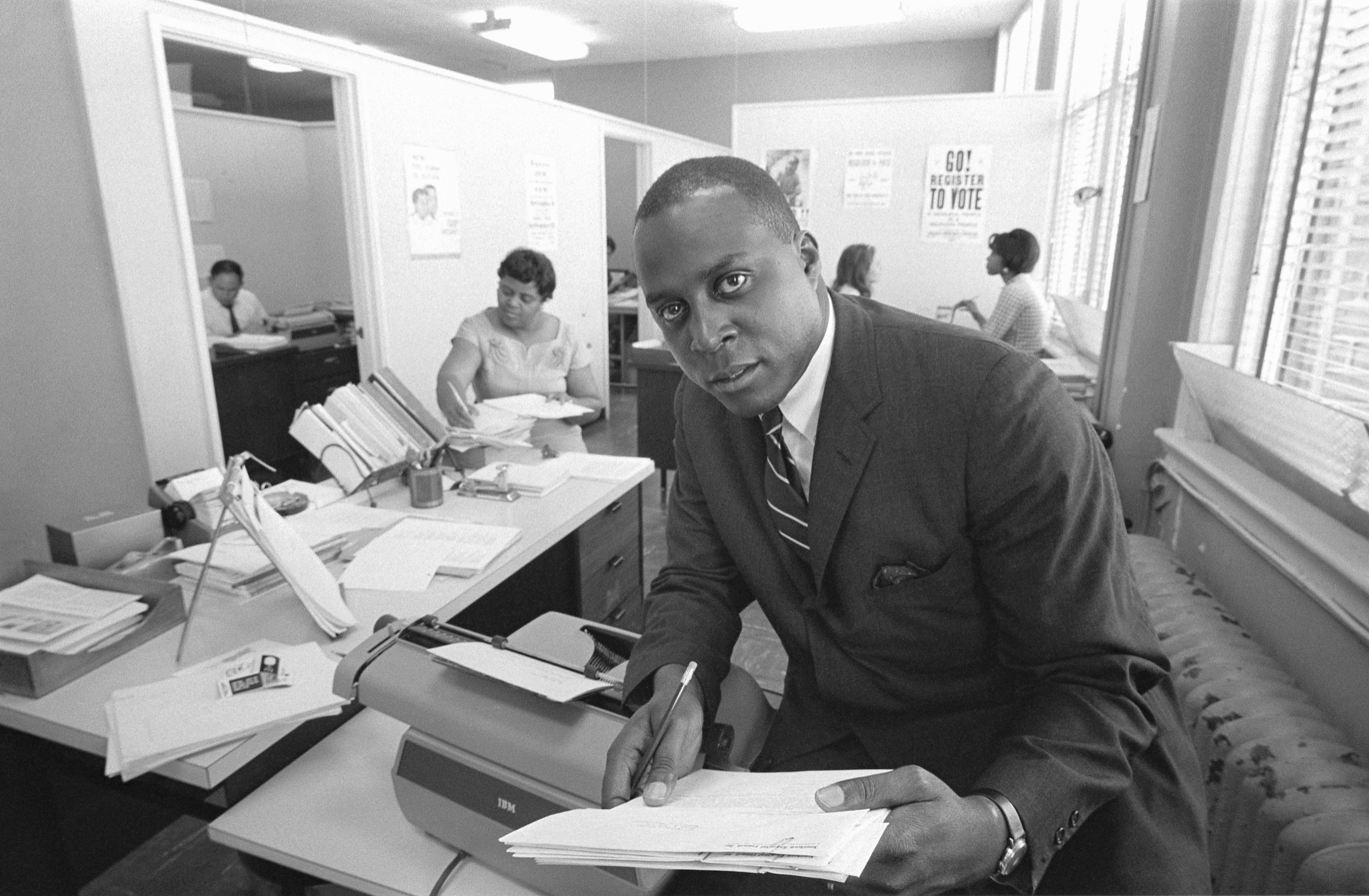
Vernon Jordan working on a voter education project at the Southern Regional Council in 1967.

Following the Albany Movement, the VEP had registered close to 500 voters in Albany, Georgia, within a period of two weeks. The group struggled in its early period and in early 1963, the SCLC was almost suspended from the organization due to inadequate reports about the group's funding. By the end of 1964, however, the VEP distributed close to $900,000 (equal to $5,700,000 in 2006 dollars) to civil rights groups doing voter registration in the South and almost 800,000 new Black Southern voters were added to the rolls. Following the passage of the Voting Rights Act of 1965, it was reported that VEP-funded registration drives succeeded in registering an additional 175,000 new black voters.

The VEP continued funding voter registration, education, and research efforts in the South until 1992 under subsequent directors Randolph Blackwell, Vernon Jordan, John Lewis and Ed Brown.

== Effect ==
The VEP helped make great inroads in the registration of voters, especially in rural areas. Contrary to the initial hopes of the Kennedy administration, the VEP did not reduce the violent realities of resistance to integration found in the South and highlighted by news stations around the world. In the Deep South, white resistance to Black voting rights turned out to be even more violent than their opposition to integrating lunch counters and bus depots. Instead of diminishing, news stories of police repression, brutality, bombings, and murders increased as white political leaders, the Ku Klux Klan, and White Citizen Councils used arrests, terrorism, and economic retaliation to prevent Blacks from voting.

== See also ==
- Faulkenbury, Evan (Winter 2018). ""Monroe is Hell": Voter Purges, Registration Drives, and the Civil Rights Movement in Ouachita Parish, Louisiana". Louisiana History: The Journal of the Louisiana Historical Association. 59 (1): 40–66. ISSN 0024-6816. JSTOR 26476405.
- Faulkenbury, Evan. Poll Power: The Voter Education Project and the Movement for the Ballot in the American South (Chapel Hill: University of North Carolina Press, 2019).
- "Mapping the VEP" - a digital public history map representing VEP-backed registration campaigns across the American South from 1962 to 1970 - http://www.mappingthevep.evanfaulkenbury.com/
