= List of cases of church arson =

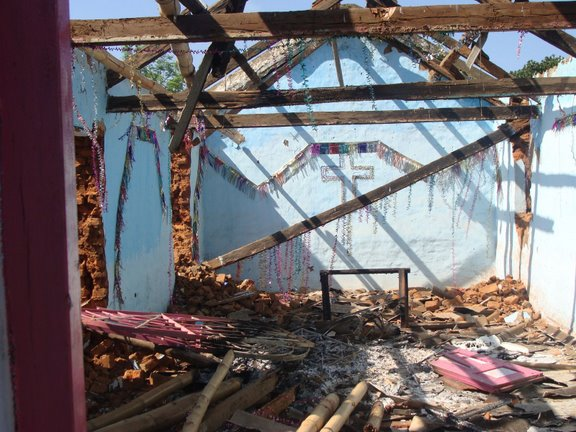
Remains of a church property burnt down during 2008 Kandhamal violence in Orissa, India in August 2008

Church arson is the burning of, or attempt to burn, religious property. Common motives for committing church arson are religious intolerance, racial hatred, pyromania, greed, prejudice against certain religious beliefs or anti-religious sentiment in general. It may also be part of a sectarian campaign of communal violence, a means of anonymously registering dissent or due to churches being a soft target.

== By country ==
=== Australia ===
In 2015, St. James Roman Catholic Church in Brighton, Melbourne burned to the ground after sexual abuse allegations came out regarding former Roman Catholic priest Ronald Pickering. Actress Rachel Griffiths, formerly a member of the church, said she was 'quite elated'.

St. Mary's Catholic Church in Dandenong, also connected to Pickering, burned in a suspicious fire as well. St. Mary's Church in St Kilda East was damaged by a suspicious fire after being connected to former priest and convicted child sex offender Kevin O'Donnell.

=== Canada ===
The historic St. John's Anglican Church of Lunenburg, Nova Scotia, built in 1754, caught fire in a suspected arson on Halloween night, 2001. It was later rebuilt and reopened on June 12, 2005.

Police in Merritt, British Columbia in January 2019 arrested and charged a man with a fire that destroyed the 143-year-old Murray United Church, and two other more minor church fires nearby. He later pled guilty and was sentenced to 24 months of house arrest on condition he refrain from drug and alcohol use.

In November 2020, St. Andrew’s Anglican Church and South Caradoc United Church, both in Muncey, Ontario, were destroyed by fire. Its pastor said "anger from things that happened, that may have something to do with it,” and the diocese cautioned against speculation and called for responsible reporting. Former Anglican clergyman David Norton had been convicted of sex crimes against children in his parish.

After the 2021 Canadian Indian residential schools gravesite discoveries, some B.C. Catholic churches on First Nations land were deliberately burned to the ground. Journalist Tanya Talaga mentions in her book The Knowing that in total, "sixty-eight [...] churches across the Prairies were torched, desecrated and vandalized," and that some First Nations hired security to protect their churches from damage, which might have endangered essential records for locating more graves.^{:157} An Anglican church in B.C. was also set on fire but the fire was isolated and put out. Prime Minister Justin Trudeau and band governments and chiefs condemned the arsonists. Harsha Walia, the executive director of the British Columbia Civil Liberties Association, tweeted "burn it all down," and the Union of British Columbia Indian Chiefs expressed "strong solidarity with [Harsha Walia] in condemning the brutally gruesome genocide of residential ‘school’ system by Canada and Church".

=== Chile ===
Prior to Pope Francis's visit to Chile in January 2018, a number of arsons at churches took place in the capital city of Santiago, and some were linked to threats against the Pope. The papal visit was dominated by the sex crimes of Fernando Karadima, whose protégé, Bishop Juan Barros was protected by the Pope, despite accusations of complicity. A pamphlet left at another scene made references to Mapuche causes. President Michelle Bachelet said in a radio address that those responsible for the "strange" firebombings, "can express themselves as long as they do it in a peaceful way."

=== India ===
During the 1998 attacks on Christians in southeastern Gujarat, Human Rights Watch reported dozens of churches and prayer halls burned down by Sangh Parivar members.

Hundreds of churches were burnt during the violence in the Kandhamal district of Odisha after murders of Hindu activists for which Maoist guerrillas later claimed responsibility.

St. Sebastian's Church in Delhi was badly damaged by fire in December 2014. Authorities initially said that the fire was caused by a short circuit, but later announced that it was an arson.

=== Niger ===
At least ten people were killed and 45 churches were burned by Islamists in Niger following the Charlie Hebdo shooting in January 2015. Niger's interior minister said that some protesters carried the flag of Boko Haram, but since the protests began in the southern opposition stronghold of Zinder, domestic political friction may also have played a role. However these events are only superficially linked and "the protests can be explained more appropriately in terms of politics and socio-economic exclusion."

=== Norway ===
On 6 June 1992, Fantoft Stave Church in Fortun, built in 1150 when Vikings converted to Christianity, was destroyed by a fire. It was moved to Bergen in 1883. The fire was attributed to lightning and electrical failure.

In January 1993, Norwegian musician Varg Vikernes told a Bergen journalist that he had been involved in eight church arsons. He was later convicted of three and acquitted of the Fantoft arson. Vikernes, a neopagan, expressed support for a spate of 52 recent church arsons, but later denied any personal involvement.

A photo of the charred remnants of a church appeared on his Burzum album titled Aske ("ashes"). After the interview, police arrested him and he was sentenced to 21 years in prison. He was released in 2009.

=== Pakistan ===
On August 16, 2023, in the city of Jaranwala, Pakistan, thousands of Muslims rioted over claims of Quran desecration. At least 21 churches were burnt down. Two Christian men were arrested for blasphemy in addition to 100 rioters. A government official told Reuters that many of the rioters belonged to Tehreek-e-Labbaik Pakistan (TLP), but the group denied having any responsibility. The far-right Islamist party was also linked to additional riots in Jarawala in 2023, also sparked by accusations of blasphemy.

An RSIS researcher told the BBC that growing political fragmentation and economic disparities, sparked violence directed towards minority religious groups; Pakistan is roughly 96% Muslim.

=== Sweden ===
The Södra Råda Old Church, built around 1320, was considered of high cultural value thanks to its well preserved medieval wall-paintings and original wooden walls. A mentally ill man burnt it down in 2001. A replica of the church opened in 2022.

=== United Kingdom ===
In 1973, St Mary's Church in Putney, London was badly damaged by arson, then rebuilt after a ten-year effort. The first record of the church appeared in 1292, and during the Civil War was the site of the 1647 Putney Debates on the English constitution.

In July 2016, St. Joseph's Church in Basingstoke, Hampshire was damaged by an arson attack carried out by two local teenagers. The churches roof was severely damaged and caused the congregation to relocate to the hall at the adjacent Bishop Challoner Catholic Secondary School until the church reopened in September 2017. The attack was ruled to not be targeted.

=== United States ===
In the United States, arsons of African-American churches have been common, especially in the south during the civil rights era. A notorious bombing in September 1963 at the 16th Street Baptist Church in Birmingham, Alabama, killed four young girls.

In the 1990s Congress passed the Church Arson Prevention Act, and President Bill Clinton formed the National Church Arson Task Force due to a sharp increase in church arson. Church arsonists were found to be young white males with racist beliefs, often under the influence of drugs or alcohol; a gang of teenage high school dropouts burglarized, vandalized, and burnt 90 churches, both black and white. They told police that they vandalized or burnt the churches where they didn’t find money.

Just 16% of fires at American churches and funeral homes were intentionally set, according to Insurance Journal, and "(m)ore than half of fires at houses of worship from 2007 to 2011 were blamed on cooking equipment and heating and electrical systems."

After the Charleston church shooting in June 2015, a number of suspected church arsons were documented.

== See also ==
- Iconoclasm
- 1999 Lake Worth, Texas church fire
- 2010 East Texas church burnings
- 2021 Canadian church burnings
- Cross burning
- R.A.V. v. City of St. Paul
- Carpenters for Christmas
- Early Norwegian black metal scene#Church arsons and attempts
- List of attacks on Jewish institutions
- List of attacks against Latter-day Saint churches
