= Carpenters for Christmas =

Rebuilding project

Carpenters for Christmas was conceived to counteract a series of church bombings and arson attacks in Mississippi during and following the Mississippi Freedom Summer in 1964. During the summer of 1964, the Council of Federated Organizations (COFO) organized a nationally supported campaign that challenged the racial segregation of the Mississippi Democratic Party and the state's systematic exclusion of black citizens from voting. Churches played a central role in this campaign, often housing Freedom Schools, serving as freedom election polling places, and serving as the venue for mass meetings. To counter this central role, segregationist forces began a campaign of terror against civil rights workers and the churches that gave them support:

Over the course of Freedom Summer, there were at least three murders, approximately 70 bombings or burnings, over 80 beatings, and over 1,000 arrests of civil rights activists. The COFO incident report, a single-spaced document that offered brief daily summaries, was over ten pages long.

In the fall of 1964, numerous churches in Mississippi and elsewhere in the South were burned, bombed or otherwise attacked. Students from Oberlin College and others organized a church rebuilding project to create national support for southern churches. They chose the Antioch Missionary Baptist Church in Blue Mountain, Mississippi to highlight the problem of church destruction, and in December 1964, with national media attention, the church was rebuilt with volunteer labor and donated materials. The church burned right after Fannie Lou Hamer gave a speech there.

The project received widespread publicity in national media, and contributed to broader recognition of need to afford protection to southern churches that supported the civil rights movement.

== Background and context ==
During the 1960s Holly Springs, and Rust College, was a locus for civil rights activities in Marshall, Benton, and Tippah Counties. Partly that resulted from the active support for civil rights from the leadership and students at Rust College, one of the oldest African American liberal arts colleges in the United States. Long before white civil rights workers arrived, Rust College Students, began to challenge segregation of public accommodations. A COFO office and Freedom School was ultimately located near the college on 100 Rust Avenue and North Memphis Street and was referred to as Freedom House. It was the headquarters for the voter registration movement in north Mississippi and the headquarters of the local Student Nonviolent Coordinating Committee (SNCC). Civil Rights workers stationed at Freedom House began to link to self-contained movements in Marshall and the nearby counties of Benton and Tippah.

African American residents of Tippah County were already involved in civil rights activities long before Freedom Summer. Hazel Foster, was an NAACP activist. A letter from the Mississippi State Sovereignty Commission to the Tippah County Attorney, August 23, 1962 writes:

Please furnish this commission with any general information you may have on the above subject (Hazel Foster) regarding activities with the NAACP, if any, or other subversive organizations.

A letter from the Sovereignty Commission on the same date seeks advice from the local circuit judge as to whether Mrs. Foster has registered to vote and inquires of any connection to the NAACP.

== Freedom Summer ==
Frustrated by the slow pace of change in Mississippi, civil rights groups active in Mississippi decided to implement a "program ... which will involve the massive participation of Americans dedicated to the elimination of racial oppression." Prospectus for the Mississippi Freedom Summer. Freedom Summer would involve the creation of 25 freedom schools, establishment of community centers, and what the project described as "a massive legal offensive against the official tyranny of the State of Mississippi." In the Spring of 1964, law enforcement and the Sovereignty Commission were gearing up for possible Freedom Summer activities. Sovereignty Commission investigators began to visit with local officials throughout Mississippi to prepare. A MSC investigation report describes a visit to Tippah and Alcorn Counties:

The officers in Alcorn as well as Tippah County appreciated very much the work this department is doing with officers. They also are very much concerned about the expected mass demonstrations which the various civil rights organizations are threatening this state with this summer....The investigative staff of the Sovereignty Commission has now visited and had discussions with city and county officials in every county in the State of Mississippi since the middle of January, 1964, these four counties being the last ones. All county and city officials are expecting trouble in this state this summer and those whom I visited are relying heavily on the assistance of this department if and when the demonstrations begin in their county.

== Promoting voter participation ==
A major goal of Freedom Summer, including the work performed out of Holly Springs, was to break through obstacles to black voting in Mississippi. Historians have focused upon efforts to participate in the Presidential electoral process. But just as important were efforts to afford black citizens equal participation in local elections. For that reason, Holly Springs COFO workers in Northern Mississippi Counties worked to enhance black participation in Agricultural Stabilization Committee elections. ASC participation was crucial to small farmers, because of the cotton allotment program.

== See also ==
- 1999 Lake Worth, Texas church fire
- Cross burning
- R.A.V. v. City of St. Paul
