= Louisiana black church fires =

2019 arson attacks in Louisiana, United States

2019 Louisiana black church fires
- Date: March 26, 2019
- Location: Port Barre, Louisiana and Opelousas, Louisiana
- Perpetrator: Holden Matthews
- Deaths: 0
- Injuries: 0
- Property damage: Almost destroyed
- Charges: Arson on three religious buildings

Three Louisiana black churches were set alight by a suspected arsonist between March 26 and April 4, 2019. The first fire occurred at St. Mary Baptist Church in Port Barre on March 26. Ten days later, two other historic black churches, Greater Union Baptist Church and Mount Pleasant Baptist Church in Opelousas, Louisiana, were also set on fire—on April 2 and April 4 respectively. The suspect used gasoline at each church, destroying them completely.

Police arrested the suspect, the son of a St. Landry Parish sheriff's deputy, six days after the third fire. Holden Matthews, 21 years old, was charged with the destruction of the churches. While there was some speculation at first that the arson attacks were racially motivated, it was later determined that Matthews was influenced by Norwegian black metal musicians who committed similar attacks against Christian churches in the 1990s.

== Incident ==
The St. Mary Baptist Church in Port Barre, Louisiana, was the first in a series of three African-American churches, over 100 years old, that burned to the ground on March 26, 2019. On April 2, 2019, a second church, Greater Union Baptist Church in Opelousas, Louisiana, was set on fire. The third church, Mount Pleasant Baptist Church also in Opelousas, was set alight on April 4, 2019. Holden Matthews was arrested on April 10 and charged with three counts of arson.

Gasoline was the primary accelerant used in each fire. The churches were empty and no injuries occurred in any of the incidents. Only one of the fires forced people to evacuate, when it spread to a neighboring home.

The local fire marshal, Butch Browning, confirmed the existence of a receipt showing Matthews had bought oil rags and a gas can. These materials, along with a lighter, were found in Matthews's truck, Browning said. He also said that Matthews filmed the church fire on his cellphone.

== History ==
A report published by the National Fire Protection Association showed a declining number of fires within religious and funeral properties. Between 2007 and 2011, however, 16% of the fires at these properties were ruled intentional.

John Bel Edwards, the governor of Louisiana, said that the chain of fires was "especially painful because it reminds us of a very dark past of intimidation and fear". Black churches have been the targets of racist attacks across the American South since the 1950s. During Reconstruction and the civil rights movement, black churches dealt with arson, bombings, and other forms of armed assault.

A group of young adults burned three black churches in Baton Rouge, Louisiana, in 1996. Officials later labelled this incident a hate crime. In 2015, a white supremacist gunman Dylann Roof opened fire on a prayer group at the Emanuel African Methodist Episcopal Church in Charleston, South Carolina killing nine black people. Nearly 200 years before, Emanuel African Methodist Episcopal Church's predecessor had been burned to the ground in 1822 by Charleston's white leaders, who feared an insurrection by the city's enslaved residents. In 2016, a man in Mississippi pleaded guilty to arson for setting fire to a black church. He had attempted to disguise the arson as a hate crime.

In a coincidental church fire in Caddo Parish region, on March 31, a small fire occurred at the United Pentecostal Church. After officials investigated it they reported no evidence was found to tie it to Holden Matthews.

== Arrest and prosecution ==
Holden Matthews, 21 of St. Landry Parish, the son of a sheriff's deputy, was charged with committing arson at three black churches. He was arrested two weeks after the first church was set on fire. Louisiana Fire Marshal H. "Butch" Browning said, "We are extremely, unequivocally confident that we have the person who is responsible for these tragic crimes on these three churches". Matthews had no prior hate crime charges or arrests.

A court affidavit outlines the reasons the investigators turned their attention to Matthews. They found the remains of 2-gallon gas can in Matthews' vehicle, and video surveillance captured his truck moments before the Greater Union Baptist Church fire started. Also, a firefighter reported seeing a pickup that looked like Matthew's vehicle near the burning church. The affidavit said federal Bureau of Alcohol, Tobacco, Firearms and Explosives (ATF) agents discovered a gas can at Mount Pleasant Baptist Church. A local Walmart employee confirmed that two Scepter-brand gas cans, a lighter and a 10-pack of automotive cloths were sold on March 25, about three hours before the first church fire. After more investigation detectives found that the purchase was made with Holden Matthews' debit card. In addition, Matthews' vehicle was captured by Walmart store CCTV. People who were near two of the fires, and called 911 to report them, said they saw a vehicle that looked like Matthews' pickup before the fire started.

James Doherty, the State District Judge, denied Matthews' bond request during the Court proceedings because of the "substantial amount of evidence" against him. Matthews had visited the sites ahead of time and used his phone to photograph and take video of the locations. Matthews wore an orange prison jumpsuit and remained silent.

His parents were only allowed to watch their son via a video link. His father, Deputy Roy Matthews, was seen frequently wringing his hands and he finally left the room crying. Roy Matthews had no prior knowledge of his son's crimes according to St. Landry Parish Sheriff Bobby Guidroz. When Guidroz called him to police headquarters to tell him about the charges, he "broke down", and later helped police to arrest his son. Guidroz said, "We are all sure that Holden's father is a gentleman and good employee. He had a very terrible time after this incident."

Investigators found that Matthews was a fan of black metal music. Black metal is an extreme kind of heavy metal music that was popularized in Norway and linked to arsons at Christian churches in other parts of the world in the 1990s. He stated that he had a desire to promote himself as a black metal musician in the mold of Norwegian artist Varg Vikernes (best known for his musical work as the name Burzum), who committed a similar series of church burnings in 1990s Norway. Matthews frequently posted on social media about pagan beliefs or traditions, and had recently uploaded picture of a gun and a knife with the caption, "I carry this..... maybe not legally but I only truly follow the law of Odin....." In 2024, the FBI released files stating that Holden was connected to the Order of Nine Angles, a Satanist and militant accelerationist group.

In February 2020, Matthews pleaded guilty in Federal court to intentionally setting fire to three churches; he was sentenced to 25 years in prison and $2.66 million in restitution on November 2, 2020.

== Aftermath ==
The NAACP has called these fires incidents of "domestic terrorism", adding that "church burning in Southern states is a reflection of the racial reactions."

Monica Harris, 57, a member of the Greater Union Baptist Church, felt sadness since the historic church burned down on April 2. She believed a part of her family history perished along with it. She was baptized and married there, and her parents were buried in the cemetery on the church's grounds. She said, "I was sad because I felt my parent lost their calm in their grave after church fire, when Matthews was arrested, I felt my parents are able to rest again."

A GoFundMe page was put up by the Seventh District Baptist Association, a 149 year old non-profit religious organization. The goal was initially to raise US$600,000 but was later increased to $1.8 million, which was successfully reached within weeks. Donations were provided by journalists Megyn Kelly, Aileen Getty and Jake Tapper. Investor and philanthropist Robert F. Smith also provided a donation. According to The Daily Advertiser, the local bank IberiaBank and a car dealer donated to rebuild the churches.

=== Notre Dame comparisons ===
This incident coincided with Notre Dame church fire in Paris. Donald Trump and Mike Pence tweeted about US support for Notre Dame church and France. Then, American Twitter users started a campaign to raise funds for the three burned black churches in Louisiana.

Journalist Yashar Ali said, "The Notre Dame will be rebuilt, but at this time, three black churches in Louisiana were destroyed by fire and need your help."

== See also ==
- List of attacks against African-American churches
- Escondido mosque fire, arson attack that occurred in the same month
- Macedonia Baptist Church arson
- Norwegian black metal
