= List of attacks against Latter-day Saint churches =

Attacks against seminary and institute buildings, historic sites, missionary training centers, meetinghouses and temples of the Church of Jesus Christ of Latter-day Saints in the United States and other countries have taken the form of arson, vandalism, and armed attacks. This timeline documents acts of violence and major vandalism against such Latter-day Saint places of worship, historical sites, training centers, and administrative properties, including an ongoing series of arson attacks beginning in 2018.

== 19th century ==
=== 1830–1900 ===
- October 1848 – The Nauvoo Temple in Nauvoo, Illinois was destroyed in an act of arson.
- September 15, 1850 – In Spalding, England, a mob assaulted and overpowered a Church member who was guarding entry to a meetinghouse in use by fellow Latter-day Saints, forcing him inside; the mob then attacked the building and forced entry. On leaving the town that evening, Latter-day Saints from this congregation were later physically attacked by members of this mob.
- July 29, 1857 – Church members were attacked in a meetinghouse by locals in Birmingham, England; windows were destroyed, door hinges were torn off, and a door to the building was temporarily stolen.
- October 11, 1857 – Church members and their meetinghouse were physically attacked by locals in Bristol, England.
- July 20, 1858 – Church members were attacked in a meetinghouse by locals in Whitechapel, England; windows were destroyed, Latter-day Saints were verbally abused and physically assaulted with gravel and dirt.
- August 10, 1884 – A home being used as a meetinghouse in Lewis County, Tennessee was attacked by ten to twelve masked men, who shot and killed four Church members. The event is known today as Tennessee's Mormon Massacre.

== 20th century ==
=== 1901–2000 ===
- August 8, 1901 – A meetinghouse in Davis Chapel (now known as Hale Spring) in Marshall County, Kentucky was burned to the ground.
- June 16, 1902 – A meetinghouse was attacked in Davis Chapel (now known as Hale Spring) in Marshall County, Kentucky, resulting in one church convert being wounded in the leg by gunshot.
- 1904 – Residents of Harkers Island, North Carolina threw rocks and shot a bullet at a meetinghouse.
- January 16, 1906 – A meetinghouse in Harkers Island, North Carolina was burned to the ground by arsonists.
- November 18, 1912 – A meetinghouse was attacked by a mob of 300 people in Bristol, England during Church services.
- November 14, 1962 – The Salt Lake Temple was bombed with a plastic explosive, shattering one of its doors and eleven of its windows.
- April 1, 1963 – A meetinghouse under construction in Porto Alegre, Brazil was bombed.
- December 16, 1970 – A meetinghouse in Hayward, California was damaged in an act of arson, resulting in $200,000 in damages.
- November 7, 1973 – A meetinghouse in Scottsdale, Arizona was damaged in an act of arson.
- April 27, 1974 – A meetinghouse in Pacific County, Washington was vandalized. Damage included graffiti, broken windows, and damaged furniture and kitchen equipment.
- February 20, 1980 – A meetinghouse in Tooele, Utah was damaged by a bomb in its parking lot, causing about $5,000 in damages.
- May 1980 – A stake center that had not yet been completed was destroyed in an act of arson in Cody, Wyoming.
- October 3, 1983 – A meetinghouse in Lancaster, Pennsylvania was damaged in an act of arson related to a burglary, resulting in $25,000 in damages.
- January 1984 – A meetinghouse in Marlboro, Massachusetts was totally destroyed in an act of arson just shortly after it had been built, resulting in $500,000 worth of damages.
- July 4, 1985 – Two meetinghouses in Concepción, Chile were bombed; meetinghouses in Lota, Chile and Coronel, Chile suffered minor damage from bombs around the same time.
- April 22–23, 1986 – Five meetinghouses in Santiago, Chile were bombed.
- May 4, 1986 – A stake center in Kirtland, Ohio was burned to the ground by an arsonist, destroying a library of historical records.
- October 23, 1986 – Clarence Leake took two hostages inside the Washington D.C. Temple in Kensington, Maryland during a 12-hour standoff with police.
- January 16, 1988 – A meetinghouse in Marion, Utah was bombed.
- July 5–6, 1988 – A meetinghouse in Salt Lake City, Utah was vandalized.
- July 29, 1988 – Bomb placed outside a side door at the Stockholm Sweden Temple, the explosion caused minor damage.
- July 4, 1989 – Seven masked assailants entered a meetinghouse in the La Florida district of Santiago, Chile, forced a missionary at gunpoint to undress, then threw a firebomb into the meetinghouse library.
- July 10, 1989 – A meetinghouse in Santa Cruz, Bolivia was bombed.
- September 6, 1989 – A meetinghouse in Santiago, Chile was bombed.
- December 24. 1989 – Meetinghouses in Santiago, Chile and other Chilean cities were bombed.
- December 26, 1989 – Two meetinghouses in Chiclayo, Peru were bombed.
- December 27, 1989 – A meetinghouse in Quilpué, Chile was bombed.
- December 29, 1989 – The Lima Peru Temple in Lima, Peru was attacked with dynamite.
- January 2, 1990 – The Omar-Torrijos Anti-Intervention Command group firebombed a meetinghouse in Caracas, Venezuela.
- October 5, 1990 – A meetinghouse was bombed in the La Florida district of Santiago, Chile.
- November 27, 1990 – A meetinghouse in Taylorsville, Utah was damaged in arson during a volleyball tournament inside consisting of about 150 players and spectators; the meetinghouse was evacuated. Nobody is reported to have died; about $1,500 worth of damages was caused.
- December 6, 1990 – Four meetinghouses were bombed in Santiago, Chile.
- January 20, 1991 – A meetinghouse in Rio de Janeiro, Brazil was damaged in an attack with two bombs.
- January 22, 1991 – A meetinghouse in Phoenix, Arizona was damaged in an act of arson, resulting in about $20,000 worth of damages.
- February 13, 1991 – A meetinghouse in the Maipu district of Santiago, Chile was bombed, suffering minor damage.
- April 14, 1991 – A meetinghouse in Provo, Utah was bombed.
- July 7, 1991 – A meetinghouse in Chile was bombed.
- July 20, 1991 – A meetinghouse and family history centre in Loughborough, Leicestershire, England was damaged in an act of arson.
- December 22, 1991 – Six bombs were set off in Chile: five in Santiago and one in Valdivia; two of the targeted sites were meetinghouses of the Church.
- March 29, 1992 – A meetinghouse was bombed in Santiago, Chile.
- July 21, 1992 – A meetinghouse was bombed in Temuco, Chile.
- July 27, 1992 – A meetinghouse was bombed in Santiago, Chile.
- November 2, 1992 – A meetinghouse in Butte, Montana was damaged in an act of arson.
- February 7, 1993 – During an address by Howard W. Hunter (then the President of the LDS Church's Quorum of the Twelve Apostles) at the Marriott Center at Brigham Young University (owned by the LDS Church) in Provo, Utah, Cody Robert Judy entered the center and threatened Hunter directly with the detonation of a bomb (which was later found to be fake).
- February 20, 1993 – A meetinghouse in Essex, Maryland was damaged in an act of arson, resulting in $3 million worth of damages.
- July 24–25, 1993 – Nearly a dozen meetinghouses in Davis County, Utah were vandalized over the course of a weekend; locks were glued, windows were smashed, and some vehicles were also damaged. The meetinghouses were located in Farmington, Kaysville, Layton, Clinton, and Clearfield.
- March 14, 1997 – A meetinghouse in South Jordan, Utah was burned in an act of arson; its organ was destroyed in the fire.
- May 1997 – A meetinghouse in Abbotsford, British Columbia was burned in an act of arson.
- June 28, 1998 – A meetinghouse in Roswell, New Mexico was burned in an act of arson, resulting in $2.5 million in damages.
- April 15, 1999 – The Family History Library in Salt Lake City, Utah became the scene of a mass shooting; the shooting left 3 dead (including the perpetrator) and several injured.
- January 3, 2000 – A meetinghouse and seminary building in Sandy, Utah was damaged in an act of arson.
- April 10, 2000 – A man drove a pickup truck through the glass doors, foyer, and gymnasium of a meetinghouse in Powell, Wyoming. He had reportedly become angered at being asked not to smoke in the building. He was the only individual injured.

== 21st century ==
=== 2001–2010 ===
- January 20–21, 2001 – A meetinghouse in Gig Harbor, Washington was vandalized, resulting in damages around $40,000 to $50,000.
- May 25, 2001 – A meetinghouse in Sandy, Utah was vandalized, resulting in at least $100,000 worth of damages.
- June 12, 2001 – A meetinghouse in West Valley City, Utah was burned in an act of arson, resulting in $300,000 worth of damages.
- June 22, 2001 – A meetinghouse in Salt Lake City, Utah was vandalized.
- July 3, 2001 – A meetinghouse in Lexington, Ohio was burned in an act of arson.
- July 22, 2001 – A meetinghouse in Nephi, Utah was vandalized with graffiti.
- June 30, 2002 – A meetinghouse in Lansing, Michigan was leveled due to an act of arson, resulting in approximately $5 million worth of damages.
- April 6, 2003 – A meetinghouse in Murray, Utah was burned in an act of arson, resulting in damages worth less than $5,000.
- August 2, 2003 – A meetinghouse in Kearns, Utah was burned in an act of arson; the man responsible for the arson also stole a Church checkbook from the building, which led to his capture.
- June 24, 2004 – A meetinghouse's trees were destroyed in Riverton, Utah, resulting in approximately $10,000 worth of damages.
- December 11, 2004 – A man armed with an ax damaged a Christus statue at the visitor center of the Oakland California Temple.
- December 29, 2004 – A meetinghouse in Sandy, Utah was vandalized with derogatory remarks towards homosexuals, blacks, and members of the Church spray-painted; this resulted in several thousand dollars' worth of damages.
- February 27, 2005 – A meetinghouse in Rose, Idaho was burned by arsonists who piled up charred furniture at the front entrance and set the structure a fire.
- September 7, 2005 – A meetinghouse under construction in North Las Vegas, Nevada was burned by arsonist's fire. The $3 million building was a complete loss.
- July 28, 2006 – A meetinghouse in Springville, Utah was burned in an act of arson.
- November 19, 2007 – A meetinghouse in Mesa, Arizona was burned.
- January 14, 2008 – A seminary building in Salt Lake City, Utah was vandalized with graffiti.
- February 15, 2008 – A seminary building in Farmington, New Mexico was damaged in an act of arson.
- November 13, 2008 – An envelope containing white powder was sent to and opened in the Salt Lake Temple; around the same time, similar substances were sent to the Los Angeles California Temple and to a Catholic fraternity. The substances were later found not to be hazardous.
- November 24, 2008 – A meetinghouse in Farmington, Utah was damaged in an act of vandalism.
- September 7–8, 2009 – A meetinghouse in the Sellwood area of Portland, Oregon was vandalized, resulting in thousands of dollars' worth of damage.
- August 29, 2010 – A bishop was shot and killed in his office at one of the Church's meetinghouses in Visalia, California.
- October 17, 2010 – A meetinghouse in Mukilteo, Washington, was burned.
- October 30, 2010 – Two meetinghouses in Salt Lake City, Utah were burned in acts of arson.

=== 2011–2020 ===
- December 16, 2011 – A meetinghouse in Santaquin, Utah was burned.
- June 9, 2012 – Two meetinghouses in Logan, Utah (as well as nine other buildings pertaining to other religions/churches) were damaged in an act of vandalism.
- June 29, 2012 – A fire that destroyed a 50-year-old meetinghouse in Tolleson, Arizona was confirmed to be the work of an arsonist.
- June 30 – July 1, 2012 – A meetinghouse in Cedar City, Utah was vandalized, resulting in tens of thousands of dollars in damage.
- September 25, 2012 – A meetinghouse in Spokane, Washington was damaged in an act of arson.
- May 5, 2013 – A failed Molotov cocktail was thrown through the window of a meetinghouse in Ogden, Utah; the remains of the incendiary device still caused approximately $1,000 in damage.
- May 13, 2013 – A meetinghouse in Magna, Utah was burned in an act of arson.
- November 7, 2013 – Three meetinghouses in Chubbuck, Idaho were damaged in acts of vandalism, with obscenities and antagonistic slurs painted thereon.
- July 15, 2014 – A meetinghouse in Frenchtown, Montana was damaged in an act of vandalism.
- October 15, 2014 – Two men and a male minor broke in and vandalized a meetinghouse in Duchesne, Utah; they also stole various items and about $500 of tithing money.
- July 14, 2015 – A week after a meetinghouse in the Glassell Park area of Los Angeles, California was burned due to a brush fire, a local gang defaced the remains of the building with graffiti.
- August 23, 2015 – The construction site of the Fort Collins Colorado Temple was damaged in an act of vandalism.
- March 25–26, 2016 – The construction site of the Meridian Idaho Temple was vandalized.
- April 9, 2016 – A meetinghouse in Vancouver, Washington was vandalized.
- July 26, 2016 – A meetinghouse in Las Vegas, Nevada was burned in an act of arson. A firefighter's union hall across the street was also targeted.
- November 12, 2016 – The outbuilding of a meetinghouse in Rexburg, Idaho was vandalized with spray paint.
- December 10, 2016 – A meetinghouse in Guelph, Ontario was damaged in an act of vandalism.
- October 18–19, 2017 – A meetinghouse in Dublin, Ohio was vandalized.
- January 9, 2018 – A meetinghouse in Twin Falls, Idaho was vandalized with graffiti.
- May 7, 2018 – A meetinghouse in Idaho Falls, Idaho was vandalized with graffiti.
- May 12, 2018 – A man broke into the St. George Utah Temple, broke its windows, attacked some of its temple workers, and smeared blood through an area of the temple.
- July 14–15, 2018 – A meetinghouse in Millcreek, Utah was vandalized.
- July 22, 2018 – A gunman entered a meetinghouse in Fallon, Nevada, killing one person and injuring another.
- August 26–27, 2018 – The interior of a meetinghouse in Spanish Fork, Utah was vandalized, resulting in $5,000 worth of damages.
- November 17, 2018 – A teenager assaulted and strangled a 70-year-old female organist who was rehearsing on the organ at a meetinghouse in Centerville, Utah; the attacker is believed to have gained entry to the meetinghouse by throwing a rock through one of its windows.
- December 2, 2018 – Five people were injured in a mass knife attack at a meetinghouse in Goiânia, Brazil.
- December 4, 2018 – A couch was set on fire in an attempt to burn down a meetinghouse in Fort Collins, Colorado.
- January 26, 2019 – A meetinghouse in St. George, Utah was burned down in an act of arson. An Episcopal church was also targeted.
- March 13, 2019 – Two meetinghouses in Greymouth and Christchurch, New Zealand, were burned in acts of arson.
- March 29, 2019 – Two meetinghouses in Orem, Utah were burned and defaced with the words "Satan Lives".
- March 29, 2019 – A meetinghouse in Concepción, Chile was attacked and burned via Molotov cocktail.
- April 7, 2019 – A meetinghouse in Tejupilco de Hidalgo, México State was burned in an act of arson; a Catholic church was also burned.
- May 15, 2019 – A meetinghouse in Boise, Idaho was vandalized, one of its windowpanes being damaged.
- May 18–19, 2019 – A meetinghouse and its fence in Provo, Utah were vandalized with graffiti with hateful religious and political speech.
- June 1, 2019 – A meetinghouse in Boise, Idaho was broken into, with some of its glass being broken.
- June 1, 2019 – A meetinghouse in Farmington, New Mexico was burned in an act of arson.
- June 21, 2019 – A meetinghouse in Cedar City, Utah was vandalized, causing thousands of dollars' worth of damage.
- June 28, 2019 – A meetinghouse in Ogden, Utah was burned in an act of arson.
- July 6, 2019 – The roof of a meetinghouse in Boise, Idaho was vandalized with spray paint.
- July 6, 2019 – The exterior walls of a meetinghouse in Shoreline, Washington was vandalized with spray paint.
- July 10, 2019 – An outside wall of a meetinghouse in Boise, Idaho was vandalized with graffiti.
- July 14, 2019 – A meetinghouse in Cottonwood Heights, Utah was burned in an act of arson.
- July 21, 2019 – An intruder attempted to set fire in a bathroom of a meetinghouse in Boise, Idaho.
- July 21, 2019 – Two seminary buildings in Herriman, Utah were vandalized with racist graffiti.
- July 23, 2019 – A gunman fired his weapon at a group of individuals at a meetinghouse parking lot in St. George, Utah.
- August 12, 2019 – An intentional fire was set in a meetinghouse in Layton, Utah.
- August 16, 2019 – A meetinghouse in Logandale, Nevada was targeted in an act of attempted arson.
- October 11–12, 2019 – A meetinghouse in Boise, Idaho was vandalized.
- December 24, 2019 – A man broke into and vandalized the Logan Utah Temple.
- January 9, 2020 – Joshua Adams Hale pled guilty to willfully and maliciously set fire to and burned the chapel of the Church of Jesus Christ of Latter-day Saints in Cherry Creek, South Dakota.
- February 5, 2020 – A missionary training center in São Paulo, Brazil was infiltrated by an intruder armed with a knife; the intruder was shot and killed by police.
- May 26, 2020 – Honolulu police launched an arson investigation involving an early morning church fire in Kalaeloa, Hawaii that investigators determined was intentionally set.
- June 2, 2020 – A meetinghouse in Plano, Texas suffered under $30,000 worth of damage on one of the exterior walls of its property.
- August 3, 2020 – A gunman fired shots at the church's missionary training center in Provo, Utah.
- September 7, 2020 – A meetinghouse in Eagle Mountain, Utah was vandalized and partially burned.
- November 12, 2020 – A meetinghouse was vandalized in Moab, Utah.

=== 2021–present ===
- January 17, 2021 – Randy Louis White, 35, of Sacramento admitted to breaking the window of a meetinghouse in Willows, California, entering the building and purposely starting fire to the building.
- February 25, 2021 – A meetinghouse in Provo, Utah was damaged in an act of arson.
- April 18, 2021 – A meetinghouse in Cape Girardeau, Missouri was burned down in an act of arson. The offender was sentenced to serve 111 months in prison and to pay $6,968,223.36 in restitution for damages.
- April 26, 2021 – A meetinghouse in Fruita, Colorado was burned down in an act of arson.
- June 15, 2021 – A meetinghouse in West Jordan, Utah was vandalized, resulting in $50,000 worth of damage.
- August 31, 2021 – Three meetinghouses in St. George, Utah were damaged in acts of arson.
- October 9, 2021 – A meetinghouse in Syracuse, Utah was damaged in acts of arson and vandalism.
- November 12, 2021 – Two men carrying firearms entered a meetinghouse in Torreón, Coahuila during a zone conference among the missionaries of the Church in that area. There were 70 missionaries (57 elders, 13 sisters) in attendance along with the mission president and his wife. The two men demanded cell phones, tablets, and wallets, assaulting some of the missionaries in the process; the mission president and his wife were also assaulted and threatened with a knife.
- November 7, 2021 – The Brigham Young Family Cemetery, a historical site owned by the Church, was damaged in acts of vandalism.
- December 2, 2021 – A monument at the Mormon Battalion Historic Site in Presidio Park in San Diego, California was vandalized.
- December 4, 2021 – A missionary was shot five times in a meetinghouse in Birmingham, Alabama.
- December 28 or 29, 2021 – $30,000 in property damage occurred during a break-in at a meetinghouse in Kirtland, New Mexico.
- January 2, 2022 – A meetinghouse's windows were damaged in an act of vandalism in Park City, Utah.
- March 27, 2022 – Windows of the Brigham Young Winter Home and Office (a historic site and museum of the church) in St. George, Utah were broken in an act of vandalism, resulting in approximately $4,000 in damage.
- April 28, 2022 – The roof of a meetinghouse in Modesto, California was intentionally but minimally damaged in an act of vandalism.
- May 21, 2022 – A pro-abortion group vandalized a meetinghouse in Olympia, Washington as well as the buildings of three other faiths in the area.
- June 29, 2022 – A meetinghouse in Monroe, Utah was tagged with graffiti.
- July 20, 2022 – Fourteen meetinghouses were vandalized in St. George, Utah, in Hurricane, Utah, and in Washington, Utah by a group of three individuals.
- July 25, 2022 – The Orem Utah Temple was damaged in an act of arson while it was being built.
- August 2, 2022 – A meetinghouse was damaged in an act of arson in Boise, Idaho.
- August 16, 2022 – Several meetinghouses were damaged in acts of vandalism in Sandy, Utah and in Draper, Utah.
- October 14, 2022 – A meetinghouse in Pocatello, Idaho was damaged in an act of vandalism.
- November 13, 2022 – A meetinghouse in Perry, Utah was damaged in an act of vandalism; it is estimated that thousands of dollars' worth of damage was done.
- November 18, 2022 – The Logan Tabernacle in Logan, Utah was damaged in an act of vandalism.
- November 25, 2022 – A meetinghouse in Saanich, British Columbia was damaged in an apparent act of arson.
- January 11, 2023 – A Molotov cocktail was thrown at the LDS Conference Center in Salt Lake City, Utah.
- February 12, 2023 – A meetinghouse in Elko, Nevada was damaged during a break-in, wherein two fires were set.
- May 10, 2023 – The windows and property inside of a meetinghouse in Johnstone, Scotland were vandalized.
- July 2, 2023 – The Bountiful Utah Temple in Bountiful, Utah was vandalized with graffiti.
- September 21, 2023 – Nearly 3 dozen meetinghouses in the southwest portion of the Salt Lake Valley, Utah were burglarized and vandalized.
- September 27, 2023 – A meetinghouse in Berthoud, Colorado was vandalized with graffiti depicting obscene language, phallic images, and antagonistic statements.
- October 1, 2023 – A meetinghouse in Idaho Falls, Idaho was vandalized by two juveniles.
- December 12, 2023 – The Provo Utah Temple in Provo, Utah was vandalized by a man with a hammer.
- March 27, 2024 – At least three people attacked a meetinghouse in Henderson, Nevada by throwing an explosive into the meetinghouse while it was occupied; four people inside the meetinghouse were injured.
- June 6, 2024 – A meetinghouse in Brentwood, California was vandalized with politically charged claims written in graffiti and two windows broken.
- July 7, 2024 – A meetinghouse in Wiggins, Mississippi was vandalized and subjected to arson by a homeless, convicted sex offender. The offender has been found guilty of two counts of arson, damaging of religious property, and use of fire to commit a felony; he faces up to life in prison, and will receive his sentence in January 2026.
- July 28–30, 2024 – A meetinghouse in Magna, Utah was vandalized, resulting in damages totaling at least $60,000.
- October 4, 2024 – A meetinghouse in Santa Clara, Utah was vandalized.
- October 8, 2024 – An arsonist set a fire at a meetinghouse in Elizabeth City, North Carolina.
- December 17, 2024 – The Church History Museum in Salt Lake City, Utah was vandalized, resulting in an Oceanic tapa cloth (valued at approximately $10,000) being destroyed.
- January 9, 2025 – A meetinghouse in Calgary, Alberta was damaged in an act of arson.
- April 29, 2025 – A meetinghouse in Provo, Utah was vandalized, resulting in thousands of dollars' worth of damage.
- September 28, 2025 – Grand Blanc Township church attack: A meetinghouse in Grand Blanc Township, Michigan was attacked by an active shooter. At least five people were killed, including the shooter. The building was also set on fire in an act of arson. The attack received significant national and international media attention, as it came during a time of heightened political and religious tensions in the United States.
- December 8, 2025 – The windows of a meetinghouse in Idaho Falls, Idaho were shot out.
- December 14, 2025 – At a meetinghouse in Bajos de Haina, Dominican Republic, a man attempted to intimidate and assault Church members with a toy gun designed to resemble a real firearm and with a homemade caustic substance. No casualties were reported.

== See also ==
- 2010 East Texas church burnings
- List of attacks against African-American churches
- List of attacks against houses of worship in the United States
- List of attacks on Jewish institutions
- List of cases of church arson
- List of mass shootings in the United States
