= Holden Matthews =

Holden Matthews may refer to:

- A character in the Beyond TV series, played by Burkeley Duffield.
- A suspect in the arson of three African-American churches in St. Landry Parish, Louisiana in 2019.
