= Cane Creek Massacre =

1884 attack on a Mormon congregation

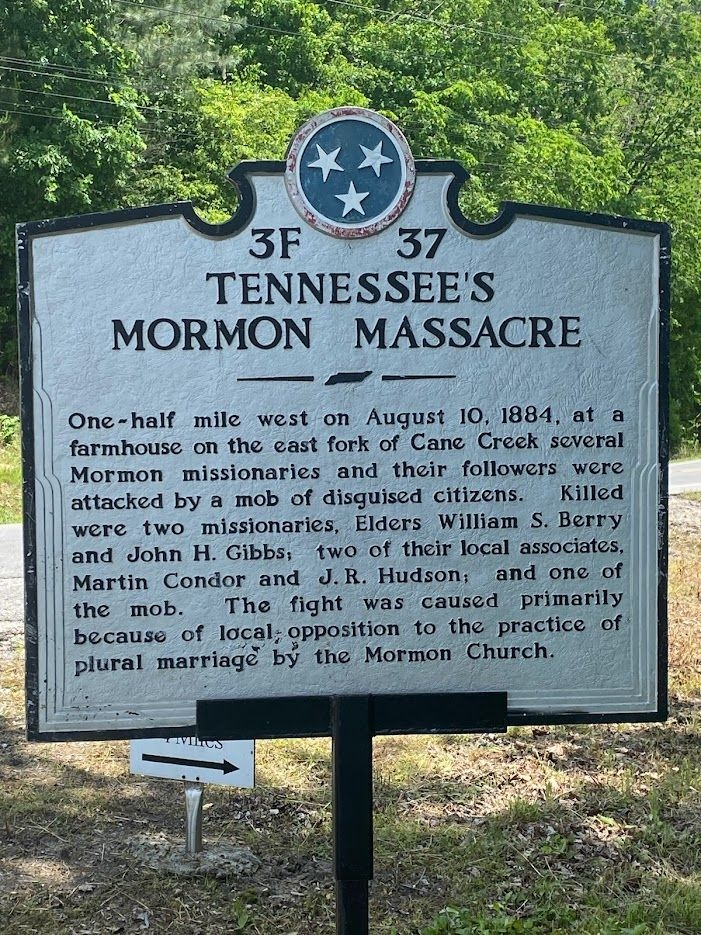
- Location: Cane Creek, Lewis County, Tennessee
- Date: 10 August 1884
- Deaths: 4 Mormons, 1 attacker
- Injuries: 1 Mormon
- Perpetrator: 12+ members of a mob

The Cane Creek Massacre (also known as Tennessee's Mormon Massacre) was a violent attack on the worship service of the Church of Jesus Christ of Latter-day Saints that occurred on August 10, 1884, in Lewis County, Tennessee. The assault by an armed mob resulted in five deaths and marked one of the most serious incidents of anti-Mormon violence in the Southern United States.

Latter-day Saint missionaries had achieved considerable success converting residents in Lewis County despite facing harsh resistance from the local non-Mormon population. Opposition was particularly intense in the Cane Creek area, where hostility toward the Church of Jesus Christ of Latter-day Saints manifested in several ways. Local opponents burned down the Mormon meetinghouse and directly threatened the missionaries with death if they continued preaching.

Two factors particularly inflamed local sentiment against the Mormons. First, non-Mormons staunchly opposed the church's practice of polygamy. Second, a fabricated sermon falsely attributed to a Latter-day Saint bishop, published in the Salt Lake Tribune and was subsequently circulated in Lewis County, significantly intensified local anti-Mormon sentiment.

Despite the threats, the missionaries continued their work in the area. On August 10, 1884, while attending a church service at the home of James Conder, a group of armed men launched their attack. The mob killed four people: two missionaries (John H. Gibbs and William S. Berry) and two local church members (Martin Conder and J.R. Hutson). During the violence, the mob's leader, David Hinson, was also killed, and Malinda Conder suffered a gunshot wound to the hip.

No trial was ever held for the perpetrators of the massacre. Local newspapers generally expressed sympathy for the mob's actions rather than condemning the violence. Mormon leader Brigham H. Roberts traveled to Cane Creek in disguise to recover the bodies of the slain missionaries. Some church members interpreted the massacre as part of a broader anti-Mormon conspiracy. The violence achieved its intended effect of driving Mormons from the area. Many Mormon families around Cane Creek eventually relocated after receiving continued violent threats.

== Background ==
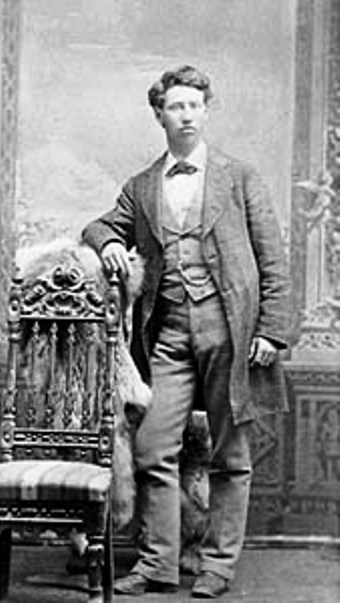
Joseph Standing, a missionary killed in Georgia in 1879.

Prior to the Cane Creek Massacre, the United States government passed several anti-polygamy laws criminalizing the practice, including the Morrill Anti-Bigamy Act and the Edmunds Act. Mormons believe that polygamy was instituted by God through a revelation to the church's founder, Joseph Smith, in the 1840s. Antagonism towards the Church of Jesus Christ of Latter-day Saints had been building in the south for years, and some missionaries had been attacked and driven away. On July 21, 1879, a missionary named Joseph Standing was shot and killed by a mob in Georgia.

On March 15, 1884, the Salt Lake Tribune published the "Red Hot Address," an entirely fabricated sermon attributed to a Latter-day Saint bishop in Juab, Utah, that called for war against the "Gentiles" and the assassination of Utah Governor Eli Murray. The article surfaced in Lewis County before the massacre, and was used by a local Baptist preacher named John Clayborn Vandiver to foment hostility towards the Mormon missionaries.

Elder John Henry Gibbs, a Welsh Latter-day Saint convert who lived in Paradise, Utah, found great success in Tennessee. In April and May 1884, Gibbs had baptized twenty-six people in the Cane Creek area. Josie Turner, a girl noted for her intelligence, and her sister Ada were the daughters of a prominent member of the community and were baptized in April, causing anxiety in the area. At Josie Turner's baptism, Elder Gibbs reprimanded members of the congregation, including community leaders, for wearing their hats during the service. Elder William Jones, who was teaching with Gibbs, later pointed to Josie Turner's baptism as the point where the community turned against them.

Latter-day Saint missionaries faced harsh opposition in Tennessee leading up to the massacre. Many in Lewis County were angered by Gibbs' preaching success and his refusal to yield to their threats and intimidation. On May 4, 1884, Elder Gibbs found the newly-constructed church meetinghouse in Cane Creek burned to the ground and a note that warned the missionaries to stop preaching in the area, under threat of death.

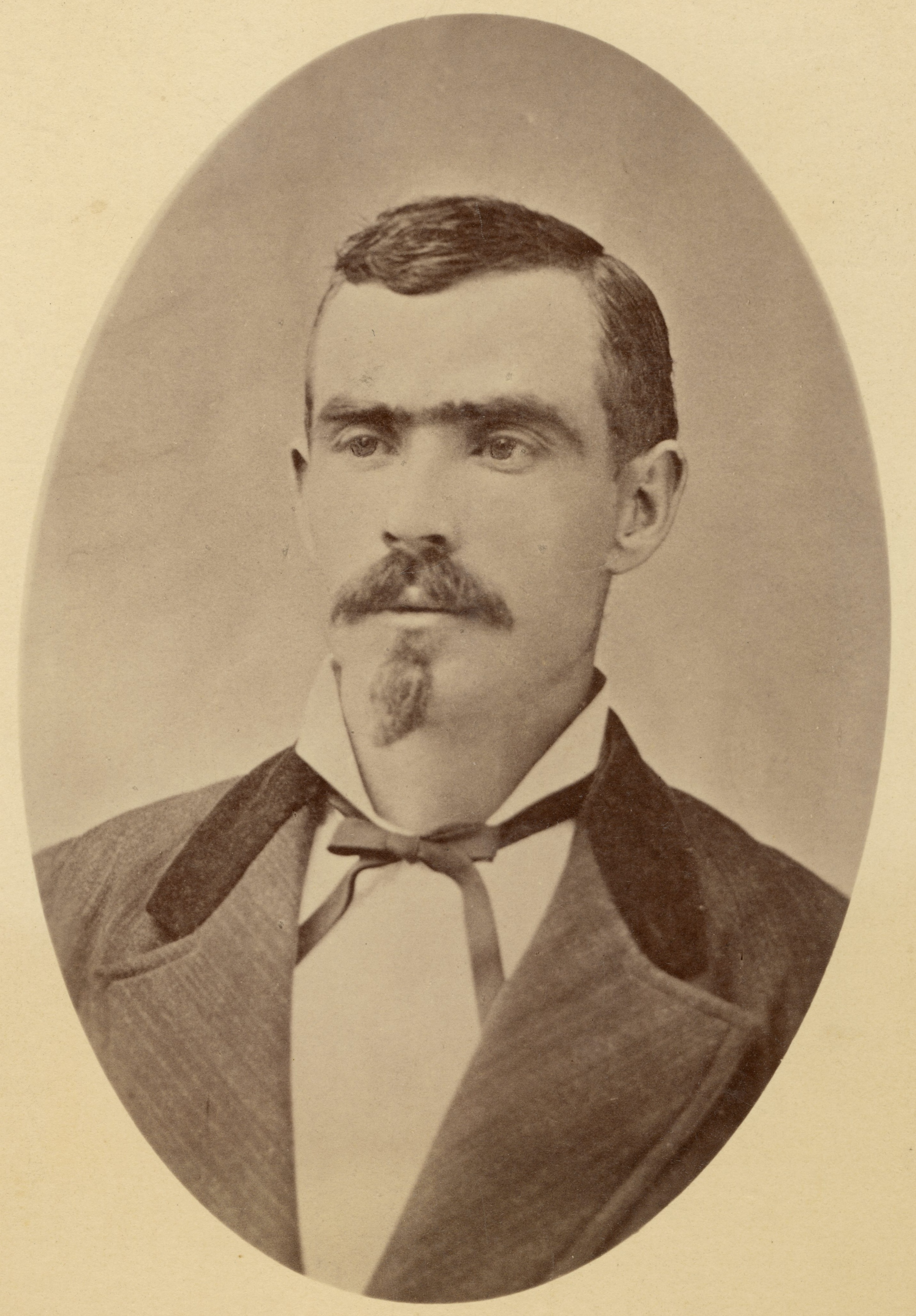
Elder John H. Gibbs was a successful missionary and faced opposition in the southern states.

In the summer of 1884, missionaries John Gibbs and William Jones taught a series of public lectures in Tennessee and Mississippi to improve public opinion of the church. They also distributed some United States congressional speeches about religious liberty to prominent individuals in the region in response to anti-polygamy sentiments. At this time there was great antagonism towards the church, and its missionaries were frequently accused of degeneracy and sexual immorality, often connected to their practice of polygamy. Many non-Mormons were worried that their sisters, daughters, or wives would convert and start practicing polygamy. Missionaries were cautious about teaching polygamy and mostly focused on fundamental gospel principles; discussion about plural marriage typically only arose because of questions or comments from the audience. Elder Gibbs' and Jones' lecture series did not improve the church's public image, but added to the southerners' uneasiness toward the Mormons.

Elders Henry B. Thompson and William S. Berry arrived in Cane Creek on August 5, 1884, and Elders John Gibbs and William Jones on August 6.

== August 10th Massacre ==
On the morning of August 10, 1884, Latter-day Saint elders Henry Thompson, William Berry, and John Gibbs left the home of Thomas Garrett, a local non-Mormon friend, for a Sunday worship service. The Cane Creek branch of the church met in the home of James Conder after their meetinghouse was destroyed. Another elder, William Jones, left the home a little later after reading copies of sermons that had arrived from Salt Lake City. En route to the Conder home, Jones was ambushed by a masked mob of twelve to fifteen men. Brigham H. Roberts later said that the men wore "Ku Klux Klan garb."

The mob forced Jones into a nearby cornfield, beat him, and interrogated him, demanding to know where Elder Gibbs was. They then set out for the Conder farm and left Jones with an armed guard. The guard, a man named Ruben Mathis, had "always been a friend to the Mormons," and let Jones escape.

At the Conder home, the Elders were singing hymns before the service began when the mob rushed through the gates of the farm. As the mob assaulted him, James Conder yelled for his son, Martin Conder, and stepson, J.R. Hutson, to grab their guns. The leader of the mob, a local farmer named David Hinson, reached for a shotgun over the fireplace at the same time as Martin Conder, and the two grappled for possession of it. Hinson reached for his pistol to fire at Martin Conder, but the gun misfired, so Hinson clubbed Martin in the head with it. Hinson then turned and shot Elder Gibbs, striking him just below the arm and killing him instantly.

Another member of the mob aimed at Elder Thompson, but the barrel of his shotgun was pushed down by Elder Berry, allowing Thompson to escape out the back door and into the woods. Berry was then shot in the waist and killed by other members of the mob. Martin Conder recovering from the blow to his head, was shot and killed by another member of the mob.

As Hinson and the mob turned to leave, J.R. Hutson rushed down the stairs armed with a gun. The mob tried to restrain him, but he managed to fire at the fleeing Hinson, killing him. A member of the mob fired back and hit Hutson, who died an hour later. As they left, the mob fired a volley through the windows of the house into the body of Elder Berry. Malinda Conder, the mother of Martin and J.R., was hit in the hip with buckshot, severely wounding her. The mob then fled with Hinson's body.

== Aftermath ==
=== Reaction ===
Mormons generally viewed the massacre as an intentional act of murder, whereas non-Mormons saw it as an attempt to drive out the Mormons that had escalated, done in self-defense. Newspapers generally sympathized with the actions of the mob because of the perceived threat that Mormonism posed. The New York Times noted that the general public impression was that no action would be taken to find the perpetrators of the massacre.

The Daily American newspaper praised David Hinson, the mob leader who had killed Gibbs, as a hero. On August 19, 1884, an article in the Daily American from an anonymous author claimed that Elder Gibbs had engaged in inappropriate conduct with several young women. Gibbs did not practice polygamy and there is no evidence that he was dishonest or adulterous. No other claims against Gibbs were ever publicly made, and he maintained a very positive reputation among Mormon converts. Additionally, an incognito missionary named Willard Bean interviewed Lewis County citizens in 1895, all of whom said that the Salt Lake Tribune's "Red Hot Address" article caused the massacre. Jack Wells and Ruben Mathis, who had participated in the mob, also said that the article started it all.

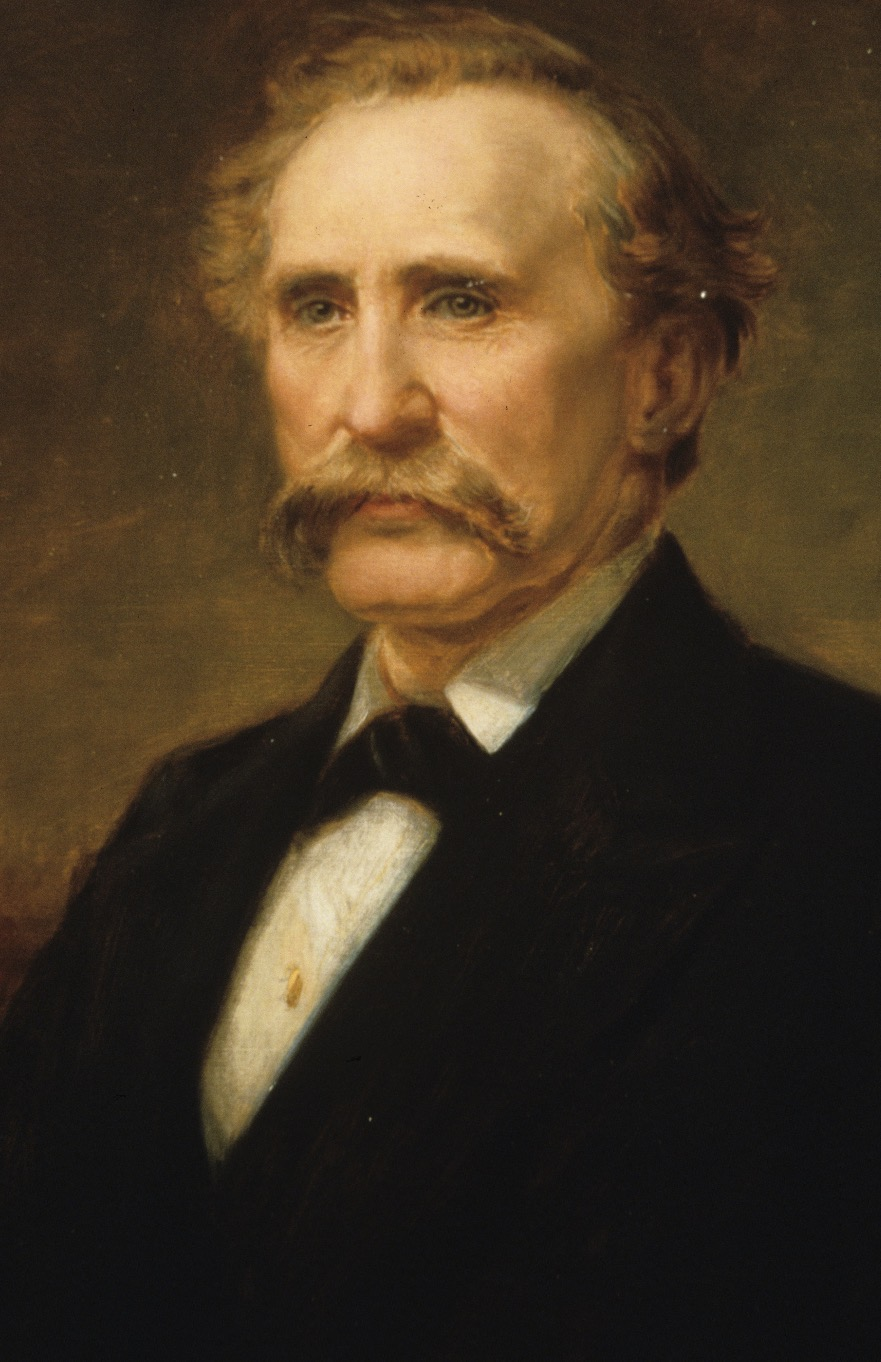
William Bate was the Governor of Tennessee at the time of the massacre.

Nearly two weeks after the massacre, and following criticism, Tennessee Governor William Bate offered a $1,000 reward if the killers were apprehended and convicted, though it was never claimed. Elder Jones believed that Governor Bate was not concerned at all with bringing the murderers to justice. Eli Murray, the federally appointed Utah governor, had sent a telegram to Bate condemning the murders, but also suggesting that the murdered missionaries were "representatives of organized crime" that were trying to recruit emigrants to Utah. Over two months after the massacre a grand jury was assembled, but no arrests were made and no trial was ever held.

Strong anti-Mormon sentiments and vigilante practices remained prevalent in Tennessee. In 1885, the Tennessee legislature passed a law making it illegal to teach the principle of polygamy in the state or urge others to emigrate elsewhere to practice it. The penalty was a $500 fine and two years in prison, though a later failed bill would have increased the sentence to eight years.

Brigham H. Roberts, acting president of the church's Southern States Mission at the time of the massacre, wrote that other missionaries in the southern states were taken from their homes at night and beaten, shot at, and threatened with meeting the same fate as Elders Gibbs and Berry if they did not leave. There was uncertainty if the Southern States Mission would continue to operate, and church leaders discussed the possibility of ending missionary work in the region. Ultimately it was decided that missionaries would stay in the south. Church President John Taylor affirmed that the mission would continue, urging the missionaries to be cautious.

=== Retrieving the Bodies ===
After learning of the massacre, mission president Brigham H. Roberts wired a report to Salt Lake City and requested $1,000 for the cost of transporting the missionaries' bodies back to Utah. Knowing the money transfer would take time, Roberts took out a loan from a man named Bernard Moses and arranged for two coffins to be sent to Samuel Hoover, a church member near Cane Creek. Roberts left his office in Chattanooga, Tennessee hoping to meet with Governor William Bate in Nashville, but instead meeting Lieutenant Governor Benjamin Alexander and obtaining a letter instructing the Lewis County sheriff to escort Roberts as he obtained the missionaries bodies. Roberts' intentions were published in newspapers and local vigilantes planned to thwart his efforts.

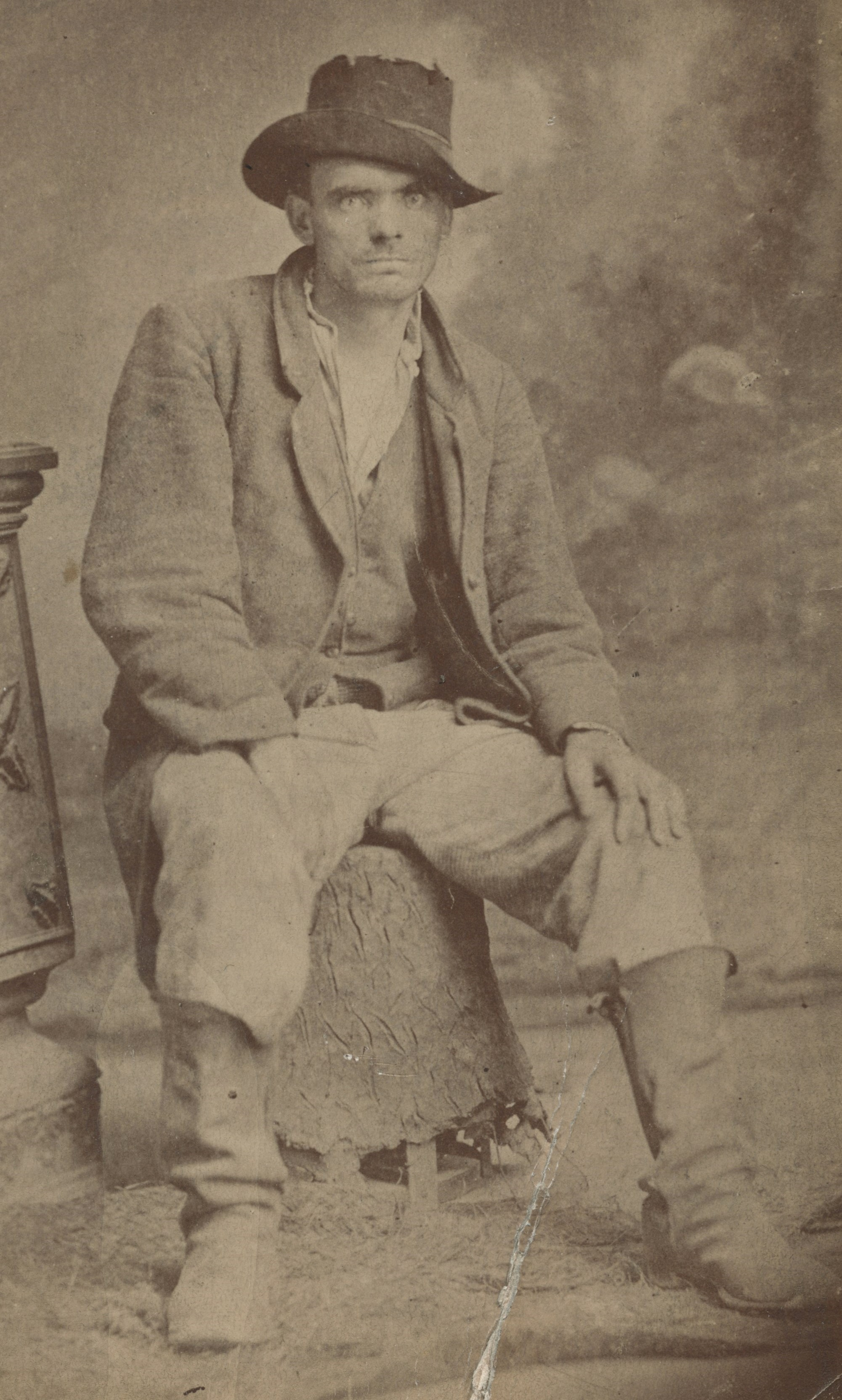
Brigham H. Roberts in his disguise.

Roberts obtained two wagons, and recruited three local men—Robert Church, Henry Harlow, and Rufus Coleman—to aid in retrieving the bodies. He donned a disguise, dressing as a tramp and dirtying his face to protect his identity from potential enemies. Roberts had been warned that vigilantes were guarding roads into Cane Creek and were planning to ambush him. The group arrived at the home of Thomas Garrett, with whom the missionaries had boarded, and having met Roberts on several occasions, Garrett didn't recognize Roberts. He allowed the men to stay the night after the disguised Roberts gave him a letter signed by "President B. H. Roberts" that instructed Garrett to assist the men in any way he could.

The next morning, the company found at least nine armed men waiting for Roberts at the Conder farm. The men did not recognize Roberts and the group was allowed to exhume the missionaries' bodies, which were wrapped in white sheets and placed in the metal coffins. After staying the night at the Garrett's home they traveled to Mount Pleasant and put the coffins on a train for Nashville. In Nashville, Roberts was photographed in his disguise before changing into clothes brought by J. Golden Kimball and meeting with members of the press.

Elder Willis E. Robison accompanied the bodies on the railroad journey from Nashville to Utah, where he returned Elder Berry to his hometown of Kanara, Utah, and Elder Gibbs to his hometown of Paradise, Utah. On August 23, 1884 memorial services for the elders were held in most of the cities and towns in the territory, with 7,000 people attending the memorial service held in the Salt Lake Tabernacle.

=== Alleged Anti-Mormon Conspiracy ===
Latter-day Saints did not blame all of the people of Tennessee, and many attributed the massacre to misinformation emanating from Salt Lake City. The height of Mormon frustration was illustrated in an address given by John Nicholson, a popular Latter-day Saint public speaker, on September 22, 1884, later printed with the title The Tennessee Massacre and its Causes, or, The Utah Conspiracy. Nicholson alleged that a broader anti-Mormon conspiracy had led to the events of the massacre, and that a small group in Salt Lake City sought to take away Mormon rights. He alleged that this conspiracy had led to the publication of the fabricated "Red Hot Address," which had fueled prejudice against Latter-day Saints in Lewis County, Tennessee.

=== Mormon Exodus from Tennessee ===
In early September 1884, Latter-day Saints were issued notices to leave the state within thirty days or meet the same fate as Elder Gibbs and Berry. These and similar notices, sometimes adorned with a drawing of a coffin and a red cross, appeared in Lewis, Maury, Hickman, and Wilson Counties. Latter-day Saints and Mormon sympathizers, like Thomas Garrett, were driven out of the area. The expulsion was a coordinated effort by local citizens, exemplified in the "safe conduct patrol pass" that emigrating families could apply for to protect them from vigilantes on their journey out of the region.

Most emigrants were heading for the Mormon settlements in the San Luis Valley, Colorado, where many southern Latter-day Saints had settled. Southern Saints were not enthusiastic about polygamy and did not practice it. Church leaders encouraged them to settle in the San Luis Valley region because there was no polygamy there, the land was cheaper, and they would be surrounded by other southerners, as opposed to the Utah area, where most settlers came from England or New England.

In the spring of 1885, after some Latter-day Saints had already left their homes, Church headquarters sent $1,500 to remove all Latter-day Saints from areas Church leaders considered dangerous, including Cane Creek. This group numbered several hundred from various parts of the South. Elder J. Golden Kimball and Brigham H. Roberts accompanied groups of emigrants on their journey west.

While many Latter-day Saints emigrated west to Utah and Colorado, the surviving members of the Conder family stayed in Tennessee and moved to Perry County. They eventually returned to Lewis County years later.

== See also ==
- List of attacks against Latter-day Saint churches
