= Freedom libraries =

Community libraries which served African Americans during the civil rights movement

Freedom libraries were community libraries set up by activist organizations and private individuals to serve African Americans during the civil rights movement. Many of these libraries were established in the summer of 1964, during a broader project of voter registration and other civil rights activism. The history of freedom libraries was largely unknown until scholar Karen Cook wrote an in-depth dissertation on the topic.

== Background ==
During the first half of the twentieth century, most African Americans living in the Southern United States lacked access to tax-supported public libraries. Due to their support of racial segregation, White Southerners severely restricted or completely blocked African Americans' use of existing public libraries. Although Southern public library systems were forced to nominally desegregate their facilities, often as a result of lawsuits filed by African Americans, many still preserved the spirit of segregation.

== Establishment ==
As part of the civil rights movement, African American activists and their allies challenged many types of racial discrimination, including in public libraries. Public libraries were sometimes the site of sit-ins and other forms of civil disobedience. In the 1960s, supportive organizations and individuals started creating freedom libraries to assist activists with their work and provide local African Americans with the library services previously denied to them by White leaders.

The first freedom libraries were created by the Council of Federated Organizations (COFO), a partnership of the Student Nonviolent Coordinating Committee, the Congress of Racial Equity, and the NAACP. Freedom libraries were often located in Freedom Schools or Community Centers. Although there were freedom libraries across the country, approximately 50 freedom libraries were created in Mississippi during the summer of 1964. That summer was known as Freedom Summer, a time period in which many volunteers came to Mississippi to create Freedom Schools and register African Americans to vote. Freedom Summer volunteers were typically young, primarily a mix of progressive White college students and African Americans already involved in civil rights organizing.

Freedom libraries have also been documented in Alabama, Arkansas, and Pennsylvania. One Alabama library, the Selma Free Library, was preferred by some students of Selma University over that of their own institution.

Freedom libraries carried books "typical" of other American libraries, but also paid special attention to books about African American people or written by Black authors. Freedom libraries were as large as 20,000 books, or small mobile libraries and many were created entirely with donated books. These donations were often provided by volunteers from northeastern states. Book donations came from individuals and organizations including teachers, booksellers, and publishers. Freedom libraries were established in spaces including churches and houses. In addition to books, freedom libraries offered other library services, including workshops and children's events, as well as existing as public community spaces.

== Challenges ==
Freedom libraries faced numerous challenges, including vandalism, fire-bombing, and other acts of terrorism at the hands of White residents and Ku Klux Klan members. One bombing took place in October 1964 in Vicksburg, destroying over 9,000 books. Nobody was killed in the Vicksburg bombing, likely because boxes of books bore the brunt of the explosion. Landlords were reluctant to rent properties to freedom libraries because of the frequency of violent incidents.

Although COFO volunteers attended an orientation to learn how to provide library services, most did not have any formal library training. Because of volunteers' inexperience, as well as limited funding, some libraries were less successful than others in providing library services. Additionally, a lack of clarity surrounding COFO organizational structure posed challenges for effectively running the libraries.

== Impact ==
Freedom libraries raised awareness among the broader United States population about the civil rights activism taking place in Mississippi. Karen Cook argues that the civil rights movement benefited from its public association with libraries.

Although most freedom libraries did not remain in existence longer than a few years after their establishment, they had a significant impact on the communities they served. Freedom libraries were the only type of library available to many African Americans in the South, and were the only place they could access books and periodicals outside of local news coverage. Civil rights activist Richard James said that it was important for Black people to know about their own history. For many African Americans, these libraries were the first time they had access to this information.
