= Freedom Summer =

1964 voter registration campaign in Mississippi, U.S.

- Part of the Civil Rights Movement
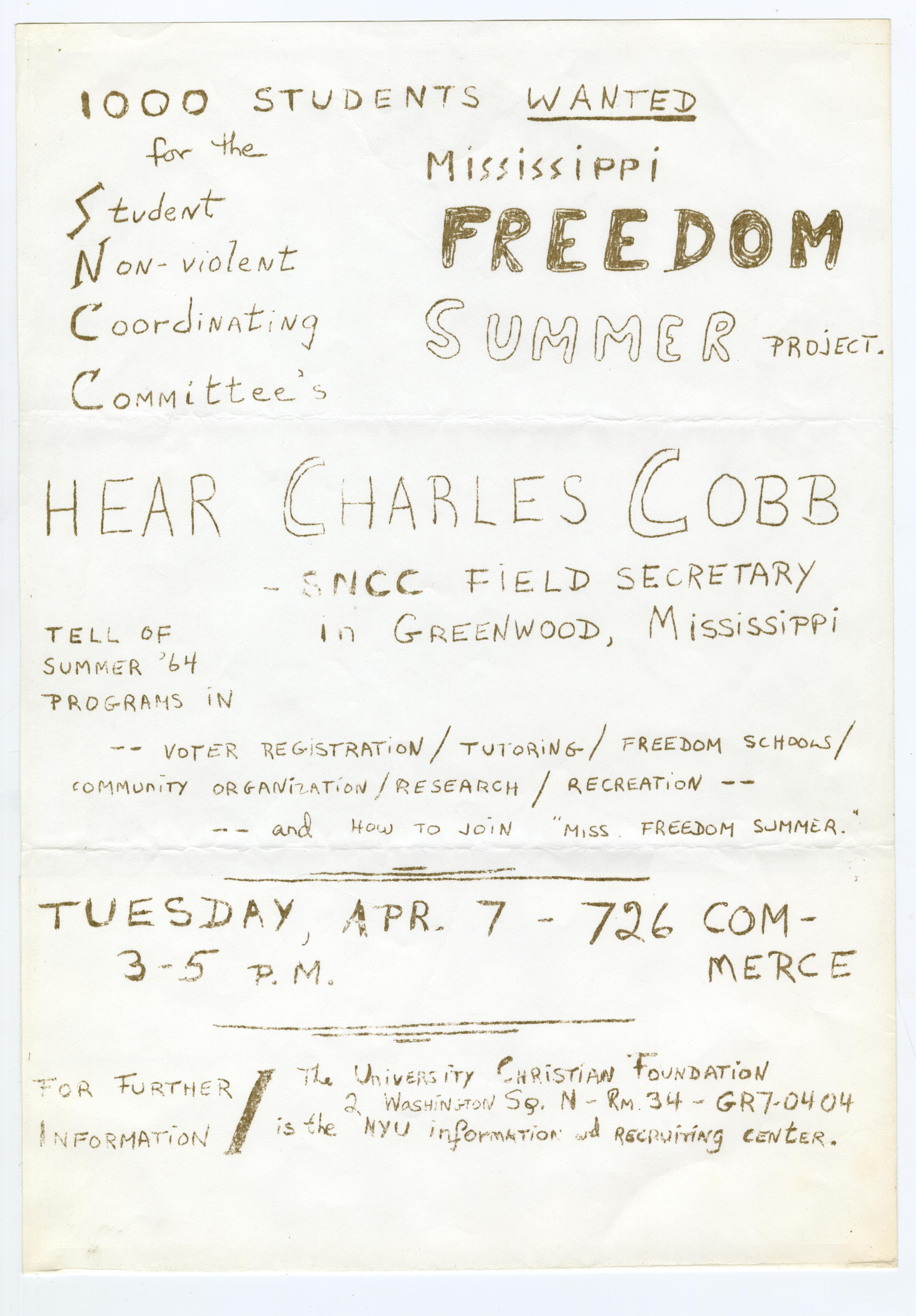
- SNCC advert for the Freedom Summer
- Date: June – August 1964
- Location: Mississippi
- Caused by: In 1962, only 5.3% of African Americans in Mississippi were registered to vote; Formation of Council of Federated Organizations (COFO)
- Result: Creation of Freedom Schools; Formation of Mississippi Freedom Democratic Party (MFDP); Murders of Chaney, Goodman, and Schwerner; Catalyst to the passage of the Voting Rights Act of 1965

Parties
Local residents; Congress of Racial Equality (CORE); Student Nonviolent Coordinating Committee (SNCC); National Association for the Advancement of Colored People (NAACP); NAACP Legal Defense Fund (LDF); National Lawyers Guild (NLG); Lawyer's Constitutional Defense Committee (LCDC); Lawyers' Committee for Civil Rights Under Law (LCCR)	Governor of Mississippi; United States Senator; Mississippi State Sovereignty Commission (MSSC); White Knights of the Ku Klux Klan

Lead figures
Local residents: Fannie Lou Hamer; Amzie Moore; Victoria Gray Adams; Lawrence Guyot; CORE member: George Raymond Jr.; SNCC members: Bob Moses; Hollis Watkins; Unita Blackwell; SCLC members: James Bevel; NAACP member: Aaron Henry	State of Mississippi: Paul B. Johnson Jr., governor; Congressman: James Eastland, senator; MSSC member: Rex Armistead; Klan member: Samuel Bowers

Freedom Summer, also known as Mississippi Freedom Summer (sometimes referred to as the Freedom Summer Project or the Mississippi Summer Project), was a campaign launched by American civil rights activists in June 1964 to register as many African-American voters as possible in the state of Mississippi.

Black people in the state had been largely prevented from voting since the turn of the 20th century due to barriers to voter registration and other Jim Crow laws that had been enacted throughout the American South. The project also set up dozens of Freedom Schools, Freedom Houses, and community centers such as libraries, in small towns throughout Mississippi to aid the local Black population.

The project was organized by the Council of Federated Organizations (COFO), a coalition of the Mississippi branches of the four major civil rights organizations (SNCC, CORE, NAACP, and SCLC). Most of the impetus, leadership, and financing for the Summer Project came from SNCC. Bob Moses, SNCC field secretary and co-director of COFO, directed the summer project.

== Freedom Vote ==
Freedom Summer was built on the years of earlier work by thousands of African Americans, connected through their churches, who lived in Mississippi. In 1963, the Student Nonviolent Coordinating Committee (SNCC) organized a mock "Freedom Vote" designed to demonstrate the will of Black Mississippians to vote, if not impeded by terror and intimidation. The Mississippi voting registration procedure at the time required Black people to fill out a 21-question registration form and to answer, to the satisfaction of the white registrators, a question on the interpretation of any one of 285 sections of the state constitution. The registrars ruled subjectively on the applicant's qualifications, and decided against most Black people, not allowing them to register.

In 1963, volunteers set up polling places in Black churches and business establishments across Mississippi. After registering on a simple registration form, voters would select candidates to run in the following year's election. Candidates included Rev. Ed King of Tougaloo College and Aaron Henry, from Clarksdale, Mississippi. Local civil rights workers and volunteers, along with students from northern and western universities, organized and implemented the mock election, in which tens of thousands voted.

== February 1964 planning ==
By 1964, students and others had begun the process of integrating public accommodations, registering adults to vote, and above all strengthening a network of local leadership. Building on the efforts of 1963 (including the Freedom Vote and registration efforts in Greenwood), Moses prevailed over doubts among SNCC and COFO workers, and planning for Freedom Summer began in February 1964. Speakers recruited for workers on college campuses across the country, drawing standing ovations for their dedication in braving the routine violence perpetrated by police, sheriffs, and others in Mississippi. SNCC recruiters interviewed dozens of potential volunteers, weeding out those with a "John Brown complex" and informing others that their job that summer would not be to "save the Mississippi Negro" but to work with local leadership to develop the grassroots movement.

More than 1,000 out-of-state volunteers participated in Freedom Summer alongside thousands of black Mississippians. Volunteers were the brightest of their generation, who came from the best universities from the biggest states, mostly from cities in the North (e.g., Chicago, New York City, Detroit, Cleveland, etc.) and West (e.g., Berkeley, Los Angeles, Portland, Seattle, etc.), usually were rich, 90 percent were white. About half of them were Jewish. Though SNCC's committee agreed to recruit only one hundred white students for the project in December 1963, Jewish civil rights leaders such as Allard Lowenstein went on and recruited a much larger number of white volunteers, to bring more attention. Two one-week orientation sessions for the volunteers were held at Western College for Women in Oxford, Ohio (now part of Miami University), from June 14 to June 27, after Berea College backed out of hosting the sessions due to alumni pressure against it.

Organizers focused on Mississippi because it had the lowest percentage of any state in the country of African Americans registered to vote, and they constituted more than one-third of the population. In 1962 only 6.7% of eligible black voters were registered.

Southern states had effectively disenfranchised most African Americans and many poor whites in the period from 1890 to 1910 by passing state constitutions, amendments and other laws that imposed burdens on voter registration: charging poll taxes, requiring literacy tests administered subjectively by white registrars, making residency requirements more difficult, as well as elaborate record keeping to document required items. They maintained this exclusion of Black people from politics well into the 1960s, which extended to excluding them from juries and imposing Jim Crow segregation laws for public facilities.

Most of these methods survived US Supreme Court challenges and, if overruled, states had quickly developed new ways to exclude Black people, such as use of grandfather clauses and white primaries. In some cases, would-be voters were harassed economically, as well as by physical assault. Lynchings had been high at the turn of the century and continued for years.

During the ten weeks of Freedom Summer, a number of other organizations provided support for the COFO Summer Project. More than 100 volunteer doctors, nurses, psychologists, medical students and other medical professionals from the Medical Committee for Human Rights (MCHR) provided emergency care for volunteers and local activists, taught health education classes, and advocated improvements in Mississippi's segregated health system.

Volunteer lawyers from the NAACP Legal Defense Fund Inc ("Ink Fund"), National Lawyers Guild, Lawyer's Constitutional Defense Committee (LCDC) an arm of the ACLU, and the Lawyers' Committee for Civil Rights Under Law (LCCR) provided free legal services — handling arrests, freedom of speech, voter registration and other matters.

The Commission on Religion and Race (CORR), an endeavor of the National Council of Churches (NCC), brought Christian and Jewish clergy and divinity students to Mississippi to support the work of the Summer Project. In addition to offering traditional religious support to volunteers and activists, the ministers and rabbis engaged in voting rights protests at courthouses, recruited voter applicants and accompanied them to register, taught in Freedom Schools, and performed office and other support functions.

== Violence ==
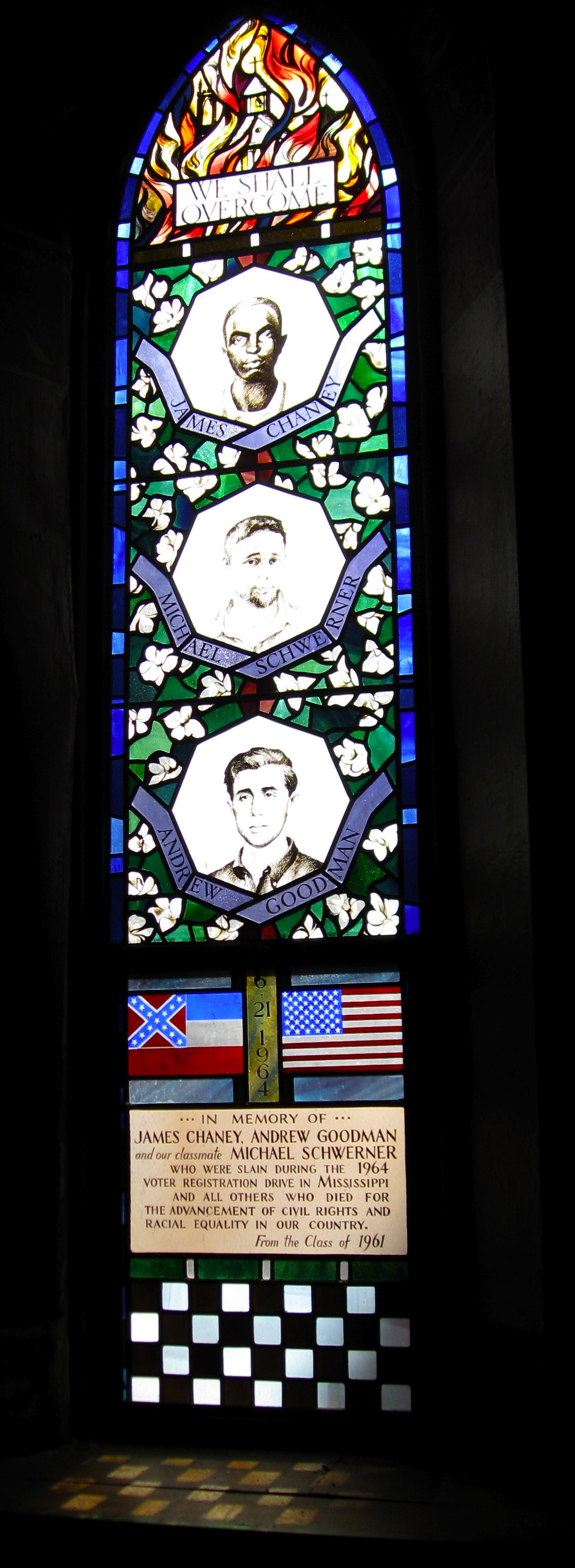
A stained glass window honoring the three slain activists in Sage Chapel, Cornell University.

Many of Mississippi's white residents deeply resented the outsiders and any attempt to change the residents' society. Locals routinely harassed volunteers. The volunteers' presence in local black communities drew drive-by shootings, Molotov cocktails thrown at host homes, and constant harassment. State and local governments, the Mississippi State Sovereignty Commission (which was tax-supported and spied on citizens), police, White Citizens' Council, and Ku Klux Klan used arrests, arson, beatings, evictions, firing, murder, spying, and other forms of intimidation and harassment to oppose the project and prevent Black people from registering to vote or achieve social equality.

Over the course of the ten-week project:

- 1,062 people were arrested (out-of-state volunteers and locals)
- 80 Freedom Summer workers were beaten
- 37 churches were bombed or burned
- 30 Black homes or businesses were bombed or burned
- 4 civil rights workers were killed (one in a head-on collision)
- 4 people were critically wounded
- At least 3 Mississippi Black people were murdered because of their support for the Civil Rights Movement

Volunteers were attacked almost as soon as the campaign started. On June 21, 1964, James Chaney (a black Congress of Racial Equality [CORE] activist from Mississippi), Andrew Goodman (a summer volunteer), and Michael Schwerner (a CORE organizer) – both Jews from New York City – were arrested by Cecil Price, a Neshoba County deputy sheriff and KKK member. The three were held in jail until after nightfall, then released. They drove away into an ambush on the road by Klansmen, who abducted and killed them. Goodman and Schwerner were shot at point-blank range. Chaney was chased, beaten mercilessly, and shot three times. After weeks of searching in which federal law enforcement participated, on August 4, 1964, their bodies were found to have been buried in an earthen dam. The men's disappearance the night of their release from jail was reported on TV and on newspaper front pages, shocking the nation. It drew massive media attention to Freedom Summer and to Mississippi's "closed society."

When the men went missing, SNCC and COFO workers began phoning the FBI requesting an investigation. The parents of the missing children were able to put so much pressure on Washington that meetings with President Johnson and Attorney General Robert Kennedy were arranged. Finally, after some 36 hours, Attorney General Robert F. Kennedy authorized the FBI to get involved in the search. FBI agents began swarming around Philadelphia, Mississippi, where Chaney, Goodman, and Schwerner had been arrested after they had investigated the burning of a local black church that was a center for political organizing. For the next seven weeks, FBI agents and sailors from a nearby naval airbase searched for the bodies, wading into swamps and hacking through underbrush. FBI director J. Edgar Hoover went to Mississippi on July 10 to open the first FBI branch office there.

Throughout the search, Mississippi newspapers and word-of-mouth perpetuated the common belief that the disappearance was "a hoax" designed to draw publicity. The search of rivers and swamps turned up the bodies of eight other Black people who appeared to have been murdered: a boy and seven men. Herbert Oarsby, a 14-year-old youth, was found wearing a CORE T-shirt. Charles Eddie Moore was among 600 students expelled in April 1964 from Alcorn A&M for participating in civil rights protests. After he returned home, he was abducted and killed by KKK members in Franklin County, Mississippi on May 2, 1964, with his friend Henry Hezekiah Dee. The other five men were never identified. When they disappeared, their families could not get local law enforcement to investigate.

== Mississippi Freedom Democratic Party ==
With participation in the regular Mississippi Democratic Party blocked by segregationists, COFO established the Mississippi Freedom Democratic Party (MFDP) as a non-exclusionary rival to the regular party organization. It intended to gain recognition of the MFDP by the national Democratic Party as the legitimate party organization in Mississippi. Delegates were elected to go to the Democratic national convention to be held that year.

Before the convention was held, Democratic President Lyndon B. Johnson gained passage of the Civil Rights Act of 1964.

When the forces of white supremacy continued to block black voter registration, the Summer Project switched to building the MFDP. Though the MFDP challenge had wide support among many convention delegates, Lyndon B. Johnson feared losing Southern support in the coming campaign. He did not allow the MFDP to replace the regulars, but the continuing issue of political oppression in Mississippi was covered widely by the national press.

== Freedom Schools ==
In addition to voter registration and the MFDP, the Summer Project also established a network of 30 to 40 voluntary summer schools – called "Freedom Schools," an educational program proposed by SNCC member, Charlie Cobb – as an alternative to Mississippi's totally segregated and underfunded schools for Black people. Over the course of the summer, more than 3,500 students attended Freedom Schools, which taught subjects that the public schools avoided, such as black history and constitutional rights.

Freedom Schools were held in churches, on back porches, and outdoors. Students ranged from small children to elderly adults, with the average age around 15. Most of the volunteer teachers were college students. Under the direction of Spelman College professor Staughton Lynd, the goal was to teach voter literacy, and political organization skills, as well as academic skills, and to help with confidence. The curriculum was directly linked to the formation of the Mississippi Freedom Democratic Party. As Ed King, who ran for Lieutenant Governor on the MFDP ticket, stated, "Our assumption was that the parents of the Freedom School children, when we met them at night, that the Freedom Democratic Party would be the PTA."

The Freedom Schools operated on a basis of close interaction and mutual trust between teachers and students. The core curriculum focused on basic literacy and arithmetic, black history and current status, political processes, civil rights, and the freedom movement. The content varied from place to place and day to day according to the questions and interests of the students.

The volunteer Freedom School teachers were as profoundly affected by their experience as were the students. Pam Parker, a teacher in the Holly Springs school, wrote of the experience:

The atmosphere in the class is unbelievable. It is what every teacher dreams about — real, honest enthusiasm and desire to learn anything and everything. The girls come to class of their own free will. They respond to everything that is said. They are excited about learning. They drain me of everything that I have to offer so that I go home at night completely exhausted but very happy in spirit ...

== Freedom Libraries ==
Approximately fifty Freedom libraries were established throughout Mississippi. These libraries provided library services and literacy guidance for many African Americans, some who had never had access to libraries before. Freedom Libraries ranged in size from a few hundred volumes to more than 20,000. The Freedom Libraries operated on small budgets and were usually run by volunteers. Some libraries were housed in newly constructed facilities while others were located in abandoned buildings.

== Freedom Houses ==
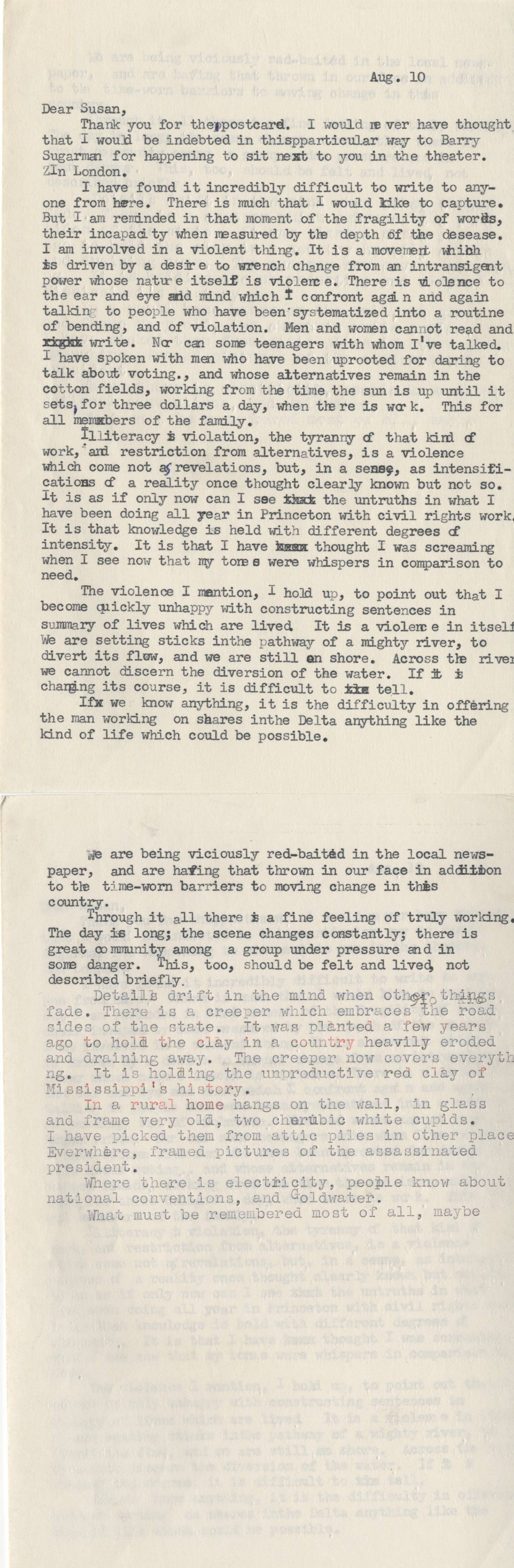
Wisconsin Historical Society archivists described this as "a moving letter fragment by Lipsky (?) describing the violence that is the essence of Mississippi to him"; this letter was probably written by Michael Lipsky, who was assigned to the Freedom House at Holly Springs

The volunteers were housed by local black families who refused to be intimidated by segregationist threats of violence. However, project organizers were unable to place all the volunteers in private homes. To accommodate the overflow, the remaining volunteers were placed either in the project office or in Freedom Houses. Volunteers believed that it was important to free themselves from their race and class backgrounds, so the Freedom Houses would become places where cultural exchange would happen, so the Freedom Houses were free from segregation.

Of course, the practice of group living was already well established among American college students, for example, and soon the houses became communal living centers. Freedom houses also played a significant role in the volunteers' sexual activities during the summer. They considered themselves free from the restraints of racism and consequently free to truly love one another. As such, for many of them, interracial sex became the ultimate expression of SNCC ideology, which emphasized the notions of freedom and equality. At the beginning of the summer the Freedom Houses were places to accommodate the overflow of volunteers, but in the eyes of volunteers by the end of summer they had become structural and symbolical expressions of the link between personal and political change. One volunteer said:

You never knew what was going to happen [in the Freedom Houses] from one minute to the next ... I slept on the cot ... on a kind of side porch ... and ... I'd drag in some nights and there'd ... be a wild party raging on the porch. So I'd drag my cot off in search of a quiet corner ... [only to find] an intense philosophical discussion going on in one corner ... people making peanut butter sandwiches-always peanut butter ... in another ... [And] some soap opera ... romantic entanglement being played out in another ... It was real three-ring circus

== Aftermath ==
Freedom Summer did not succeed in getting many voters registered, but it had a significant effect on the course of the Civil Rights Movement. It helped break down the decades of isolation and repression that had supported the Jim Crow system. Before Freedom Summer, the national news media had paid little attention to the persecution of Black voters in the Deep South and the dangers endured by Black civil rights workers. The events that summer had captured national attention, as had the mass protests and demonstrations in previous years.

However, some Black activists felt that the media had responded only because Northern white students were killed, and felt embittered. Many Black people also felt that some of the white students were condescending and paternalistic to the local people and were rising to an inappropriate prominence in the movement. Leading up to the November 1964 federal election, repression persisted in Mississippi, with nuisance arrests, beatings, and church burnings continuing. The discontent with the white students and the increasing need for armed defense against segregationists helped create demand for a Black Power direction in SNCC.

Many of the volunteers have recounted that the summer was one of the defining periods of their lives. They had trouble readjusting to life outside Mississippi. They came with a positive image of the government, but the events of the Freedom Summer upset this simplistic distinction between 'good guys' and 'bad guys'. They saw that those two ideas were linked together. They experienced such lawlessness that they became critical toward American society and federal agencies, like the FBI. Most of the volunteers became politicized in Mississippi. They left intent on carrying on the fight in the North. After that summer, many Christians faced a religious crisis. Personal transformation of volunteers led to social changes. It increased student activity in the civil rights movement. These students also played a role later in the resurgence of political and social activism in the United States.

Long-term volunteers staffed the COFO and SNCC offices throughout Mississippi. After the flood of summer workers in 1964, their leadership decided that projects should continue the following summer, but under the direction of local leadership. This was challenged by Northern establishment members of the coalition, beginning with Americans for Democratic Action, who also disapproved of the MFDP. This encouraged the NAACP to withdraw from COFO, both because they did not want to anger liberal Democrats, and because they resented the organizational competition from SNCC. After the MFDP was denied voting status at the 1964 Democratic National Convention, Bob Moses was deeply disillusioned and bowed out of both MFDP and COFO. COFO collapsed in 1965, leaving organizing priorities to be set by locals.

Among many notable veterans of Freedom Summer were Heather Booth, Marshall Ganz, and Mario Savio. After the summer, Heather Booth returned to Illinois, where she became a founder of the Chicago Women's Liberation Union and later the Midwest Academy. Marshall Ganz returned to California, where he worked for many years on the staff of the United Farm Workers. He later taught organizing strategies. In 2008 he played a crucial role in organizing Barack Obama's field staff for the campaign. Mario Savio returned to the University of California, Berkeley, where he became a leader of the Free Speech Movement, which sprang up spontaneously in October 1964 in response to the university's attempt to shut down informational tabling and fundraising by student activists on behalf of the Civil Rights Movement.

In Mississippi, controversy raged over the three murders. Mississippi state and local officials did not indict anyone. The FBI continued to investigate. Agents infiltrated the KKK and paid informers to reveal secrets of their "klaverns". In the fall of 1964, informants told the FBI about the murders of Chaney, Goodman, and Schwerner. On December 4, the FBI arrested 19 men as suspects. All were freed on a technicality, starting a three-year battle to bring them to justice. In October 1967, the men, including the Klan's Imperial Wizard Samuel Bowers, who had allegedly ordered the murders, went on trial in the federal courthouse in Meridian. Seven were ultimately convicted of federal crimes related to the murders. All were sentenced to 3–10 years, but none served more than six years. This marked the first time since Reconstruction era that white men had been convicted of civil rights violations against Black people in Mississippi.

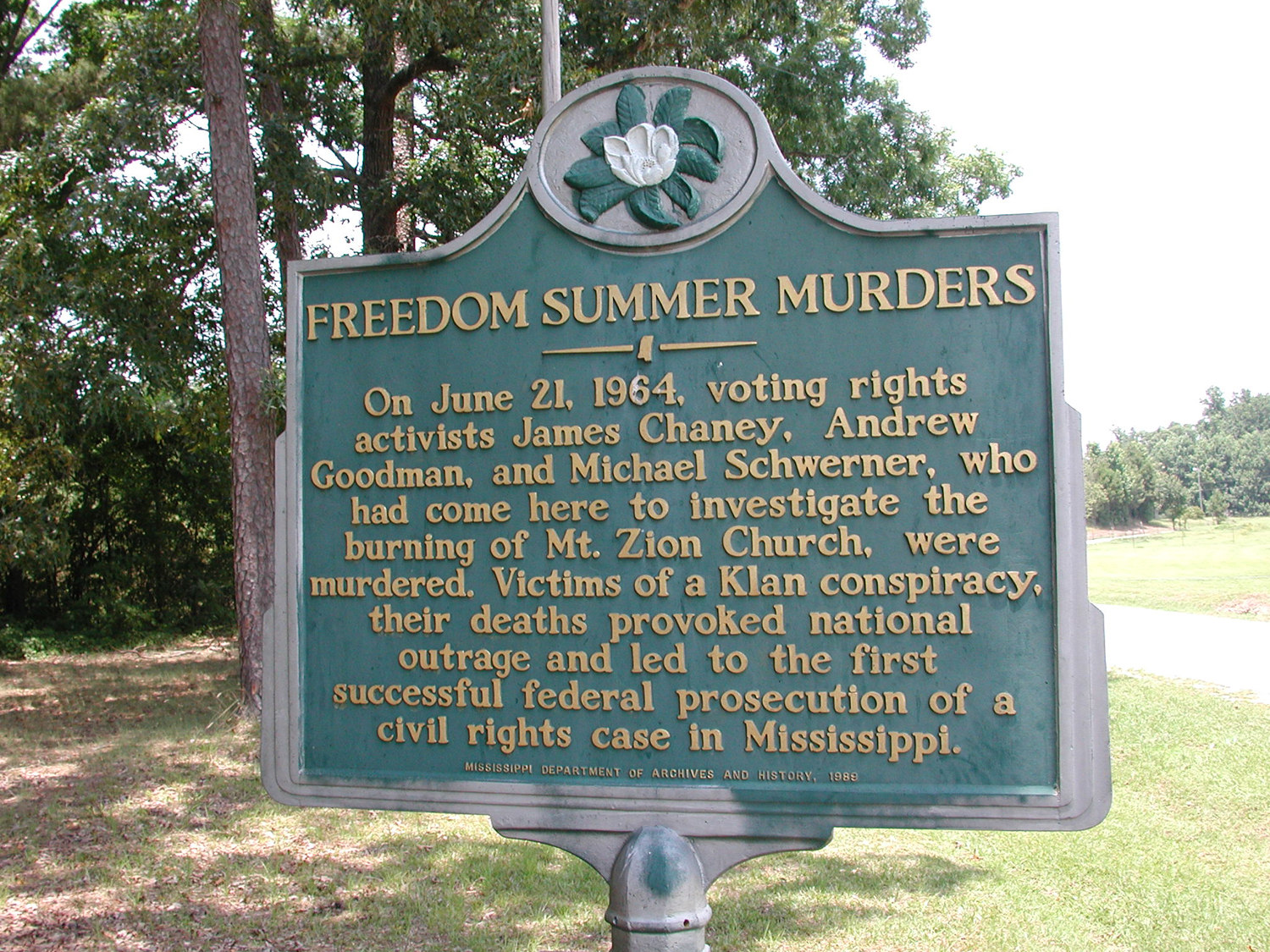
Mt. Zion Church state history marker near Philadelphia, Mississippi

Mississippi began to make some racial progress but white supremacy was resilient, especially in rural areas. In 1965 Congress passed the federal Voting Rights Act, which provided for federal oversight and enforcement to facilitate registration and voting in areas of historically low turnout. Mississippi's legislature passed several laws to dilute the power of black votes. Only with Supreme Court rulings and more than a decade of cooling did black voting become a reality in Mississippi. The seeds planted during Freedom Summer bore fruit in the 1980s and 1990s, when Mississippi elected more black officials than any other state. Since redistricting in 2003, Mississippi has had four congressional districts. Mississippi's 2nd congressional district, covering a concentration of black population in the western part of the state, including the Mississippi Delta, is black majority.

Renewed investigation of the 1964 murders of Chaney, Goodman, and Schwerner led to a trial by the state in 2005. As a result of investigative reporting by Jerry Mitchell (an award-winning reporter for the Jackson Clarion-Ledger), high school teacher Barry Bradford, and three of his students from Illinois (Brittany Saltiel, Sarah Siegel, and Allison Nichols), Edgar Ray Killen, one of the leaders of the killings and a former Ku Klux Klan klavern recruiter, was indicted for murder. He was convicted of three counts of manslaughter. The Killen verdict was announced on June 21, 2005, the forty-first anniversary of the crime. Killen's lawyers appealed the verdict, but his sentence of 3 times 20 years in prison was upheld on January 12, 2007, in a hearing by the Supreme Court of Mississippi.

In a 2009 article, Stanford historian James T. Campbell highlights Freedom Summer as an example where structured efforts to reconcile conflicting historical views—held by white and Black Mississippians—could have lessened the event's lasting effects. Although Campbell doesn't directly call for a truth and reconciliation commission for the events of 1964, he suggests that the violent outcomes stemmed from two opposing interpretations of history. Specifically, he argues that many white Mississippians believed distorted narratives about Reconstruction and the Civil Rights Movement, seeing them as "reverse white victimization," which contributed to the violence during Freedom Summer. These unresolved conflicts, Campbell believes, continue to fuel racial divisions in Mississippi today. He emphasizes the need for formal efforts to address and heal from past injustices, like those of Freedom Summer.

== See also ==
- African-American–Jewish relations
- Carpenters for Christmas
- Summer in Mississippi

== Bibliography ==
- Clayborne Carson, In Struggle: SNCC and the Black Awakening of the 1960s (Harvard University Press, 1981). ISBN 0-674-44726-3
- Doug McAdam, Freedom Summer (New York and Oxford: Oxford University Press, 1988). ISBN 0-19-504367-7
- Bruce Watson, Freedom Summer: The Savage Season That Made Mississippi Burn and Made America a Democracy (New York: Viking, 2010). ISBN 978-0-670-02170-3
