= St. Sebastian's Church (Dilshad Garden) =

Coordinates: 28.6875431°N 77.3159818°E

- St. Sebastian's Church
- Location: Dilshad Garden, Delhi
- Country: India
- Denomination: Roman Catholic

History
- Dedication: St. Sebastian

Architecture
- Architectural type: Parish church
- Years built: 2001

Administration
- Province: Delhi
- Diocese: Delhi
- Deanery: Eastern Deanery

Clergy
- Archbishop: Anil Couto

St. Sebastian's Church is located in Dilshad Garden in the city of Delhi, India. The church is dedicated to Saint Sebastian.

== Arson ==
In the year 2014 prior to Christmas was gutted by some anti social elements so as to create social unrest among the religious minority community listing one more incident of Anti-Christian violence in India. The Evangelical Fellowship of India condemned the burning of St. Sebastian's Church. The entire interior of the Church building, including the Altar, the Holy Bible and Cross were reduced to ashes. The church was constructed in 2001 in East Delhi. The forensic team that was investigating found traces of kerosene inside the church premises.

Delhi Archbishop Most Rev. Anil Couto said "The arson in St. Sebastian's church was condemnable not just because it was an act of sacrilege and hate against the community and its faith, but that it could happen in the national Capital which is just recovering from a series of communal incidents."

The act of sacrilege and hate against the Christian community is carried with impunity with very often law agencies remaining silent spectators. This will dent the image of the present government within India and abroad and leave the minorities vulnerable and targets of hatred.

Archbishop Couto demanded a judicial inquiry into the incident. Hundreds of Christians protested the arson in Delhi, and the continued persecution of Christians in Madhya Pradesh, Chhattisgarh and other tribal and rural areas.

=== Responses ===
There was no response of the ruling Government of India on the arson attack, which upset the local Christian community. However, the incident was criticized internationally, including a scathing editorial by The New York Times stating that "Attacks at Christian places of worship have prompted no response from the man elected to represent and to protect all of India's citizens."

== Administration ==
The church is a Latin Rite church administered by Roman Catholic Archdiocese of Delhi, an archdiocese of Catholic Church in India.

== Parish Council ==
There is also a parish council of the church whose members take decisions regarding the welfare of Church people, the decisions regarding feast celebration, organisation of camps are taken with the consent of parish members. Monthly meeting is held for this purpose.

== Youth ==
Indian Catholic Youth Movement being the apex body under the auspices of Catholic Bishops' Conference of India works for the development of Christian youth helps the upcoming Christian youth various seminars, Retreat camps are simultaneously organised for and by youth with the helping hands of parish council members. The function of the youth is to provide their services at times of social services at church as choir, musician, church decoration etc. Duties are rotated among the members of group and hence responsible ones are nominated as leaders for the group.
