= List of attacks against African-American churches =

Attacks against African-American churches in the United States have taken the form of arson, bombings, mass murder, hate crimes, and white supremacist-propelled domestic terrorism. This timeline documents acts of violence against churches with predominantly black leadership and congregations.

== 19th century ==
- 1822 Emanuel African Methodist Episcopal Church in Charleston, South Carolina was burned down.

== 20th century ==
- 1921 May 31 Black Wall Street Church, Bombed, Tulsa, Oklahoma

=== 1951–1960 ===
- 1955 October 5 Burning of St. James AME Church, Lake City, South Carolina
- 1956 December 25 Bethel Baptist Church in Birmingham, Alabama, was bombed.
- 1957 April 28 At Allen Temple African Methodist Episcopal Church in Bessemer, Alabama, dynamite exploded at the rear of the church during an evening service.
- 1958 June 29 Bethel Baptist Church in Birmingham, Alabama, was bombed again. This time, guards removed the bombs to a ditch; the blast blew out the windows, however.

=== 1961–1970 ===
- 1962 January 16 New Bethel Baptist Church, St Luke's African Methodist Episcopal Church, and Triumph Church Kingdom of God and Christ, all three in Birmingham, Alabama, were fire-bombed.
- 1962 September 25 St. Matthew's Baptist Church of Macon, Georgia, was burned. "It is the fifth church to burn in a month."
- 1962 December 14 At Bethel Baptist Church in Birmingham, Alabama, a third bomb blew out the church windows.
- 1963 August 10 St. James United Methodist Church of Birmingham, Alabama, was destroyed by a "gasoline fire bomb."
- 1963 September 15 16th Street Baptist Church in Birmingham, Alabama, was bombed during a Sunday church service. Twenty-two people were injured and four girls died.
- 1964 June 16 Mount Zion Methodist Church in Longdale, Mississippi, was burned to the ground. An investigation by Mississippi civil rights workers led to the murders of Chaney, Goodman, and Schwerner.
- 1964 July 30 Mount Moriah Baptist Church near Meridian, Mississippi was leveled by fire. This attack is connected to countless others that were meant to intimidate Black residents who were active in the Civil rights movement.
- 1964 July 31 Pleasant Grove Missionary Baptist Church in Rankin County, Mississippi, 15 miles east of Jackson, burned shortly before midnight. At least 15 churches were damaged or destroyed by fire between the statewide civil rights drive opening in mid-June and this day.
- 1966 October 6 The Second Bethel Baptist Church, an African American church in Richmond, Virginia, was bombed by unidentified individuals. The incident, indicative of Ku Klux Klan (KKK) activity, led civil rights organizations, including the Virginia chapter of the NAACP, to pressure Governor Mills E. Godwin to publicly condemn the Klan. This bombing was part of the broader context of racially motivated violence during the Civil Rights Movement.

=== 1971–1980 ===
- 1972 (exact date unknown) Cartersville Baptist Church, in Reston, Virginia, was burned, causing the main church to fall into the basement.
- 1974 June 30 At Ebenezer Baptist Church in Atlanta, Georgia, Alberta Williams King, mother of Martin Luther King Jr., and Edward Boykin were killed by a man who had determined that "black ministers were a menace to black people." A third churchgoer was wounded.
- 1977 December 18 Zoah Methodist Church, Mulberry Baptist in Wilkes County, Georgia; Mt. Zion Baptist Church and Antioch CME in Lincoln County, Georgia. Three teens were found guilty in the burning of 4 black churches in Wilkes and Lincoln counties.
- 1979 December 16 Second Wilson Church of Chester, South Carolina, a meeting place for civil rights activists, was gutted by fire.

=== 1991–2000 ===
More than 30 black churches were burned in an 18-month period in 1995 and 1996, leading Congress to pass the Church Arson Prevention Act.

- 1993 April 5 Rocky Point Missionary Baptist Church in Pike County, Mississippi, was set on fire by three teenagers who served time.
- 1995 January 13 Johnson Grove Baptist Church in Bells, Tennessee, was burned.
- 1995 January 13 Macedonia Baptist Church in Denmark, Tennessee, was burned.
- 1995 January 31 Mount Calvary Baptist Church in Hardeman County, Tennessee, was burned.
- 1995 June 21 Outside of Manning, South Carolina, four men affiliated with the Ku Klux Klan worked together to burn down Macedonia Baptist Church and Mt. Zion African Methodist Episcopal Church of Greeleyville, both majority black churches. Criminal convictions were obtained. In a 1998 civil suit, Grand Dragon Horace King and four other Klansmen, together with Klan organisations, were sued for $37.8 million for their roles, an amount reduced on appeal.
- 1995 August 15 St. John Baptist Church in Lexington County, South Carolina, was burned and an arrest was made.
- 1995 October 31 Mount Pisgah Baptist Church of Raeford, North Carolina, was burned.
- 1995 December 22 Mount Zion Baptist Church of Boligee, Alabama, was burned.
- 1995 December 30 Salem Baptist Church in Gibson County, Tennessee, was burned.
- 1996 January 6 Ohovah African Methodist Episcopal Church of Orrum, North Carolina, was burned and an arrest was made.
- 1996 January 8 Inner City Church of Knoxville, Tennessee, was burned.
- 1996 January 11 Little Zion Baptist Church and Mount Zoar Baptist Church of Green County, Alabama, were both burned on the same day.
- 1996 February 1 Cypress Grove Baptist Church, St. Paul's Free Baptist Church, and Thomas Chapel Benevolent Society of East Baton Rouge, Louisiana, were all burned on the same day.
- 1996 February 1 Sweet Home Baptist Church in Baker, Louisiana, was burned.
- 1996 February 21 Glorious Church of God in Christ of Richmond, Virginia, was burned.
- 1996 February 28 New Liberty Baptist Church in Tyler, Alabama, was burned and an arrest was made.
- 1996 March 5 St. Paul African Methodist Episcopal Church in Hatley, Mississippi, was burned.
- 1996 March 20 New Mount Zion Baptist Church in Ruleville, Mississippi, was burned.
- 1996 March 27 Gay's Hill Baptist Church of Millen, Georgia, was burned.
- 1996 March 30 El Bethel Missionary Baptist Church of Satartia, Mississippi, was burned and an arrest was made.
- 1996 March 31 Butler Chapel African Methodist Episcopal Church of Orangeburg, South Carolina, was burned.
- 1996 April 11 St. Charles Baptist Church in Paincourtville, Louisiana, was burned.
- 1996 April 13 Rosemary Baptist Church in Barnwell, South Carolina, was burned.
- 1996 April 26 Effingham Baptist Church in Effingham, South Carolina, was burned.
- 1996 May 14 Mount Pleasant Baptist Church in Tigrett, Tennessee, was burned.
- 1996 May 23 Mount Tabor Baptist Church in Cerro Gordo, North Carolina, was burned.
- 1996 May 24 Pleasant Hill Baptist Church in Lumberton, North Carolina, was burned.
- 1996 June 3 Rising Star Baptist Church in Greensboro, Alabama, was burned.
- 1996 June 7 Matthews Murkland Presbyterian Church sanctuary in Charlotte, North Carolina, was burned and an arrest was made.
- 1996 June 9 New Light House of Prayer and The Church of the Living God, both of Greenville, Texas, were burned on the same day.
- 1996 June 12 Evangelist Temple on Marianna, Florida, was burned.
- 1996 June 13 First Missionary Baptist Church of Enid, Oklahoma, was burned and an arrest was made.
- 1996 June 17 Hills Chapel Baptist Church, Rocky Point, North Carolina, is burned.
- 1996 June 17 Mount Pleasant Missionary Baptist Church and Central Grove Missionary Baptist Church, both of Kossuth, Mississippi, were burned on the same day.
- 1996 June 20 Immanuel Christian Fellowship of Portland, Oregon, was burned.
- 1996 June 24 New Birth Temple Church of Shreveport, Louisiana, was burned.

== 21st century ==
=== 2001–2010 ===
- 2006 July 11 A cross was burned outside a predominantly black church in Richmond, Virginia
- 2008 November 5 Macedonia Church of God in Christ, in Springfield, Massachusetts, was burned down and an arrest was made.
- 2009 July 4 A suspect motivated by hatred of the racial or ethnic background of the Redeeming Fire Fellowship Church threw a homemade pipe bomb with a lit fuse into the Buffalo, New York building. The fuse on the device extinguished on the ground and was safely detonated by responding authorities. The suspect pled guilty to committing the attack, which held a fine of $250,000 and a sentence of 10 to 20 years in prison.
- 2010 May 13 Cedar Grove A.M.E. Church in Orangeburg County, South Carolina was burned down by a drunk teenager who was charged with breaking into the church building and setting it on fire.
- 2010 December 28 In Crane, Texas, the Faith in Christ Church was vandalized with "racist and threatening graffiti" and then firebombed by a man who was attempting to gain entry into the Aryan Brotherhood of Texas; an arrest was made and the perpetrator was found guilty and sentenced to 37 years in prison.

=== 2011–present ===
- 2014 November 24 The Flood Christian Church in Ferguson, Missouri, was burned by arsonists during a series of protests over the police shooting of Michael Brown Jr. Michael Brown Sr. had been baptized at the church a week before the fire. While other buildings in Ferguson were burned that night, the church was some distance from the protests, and buildings nearby were not damaged; investigators also found signs of forced entry at the church. Members of the congregation believed it had been a targeted attack, motivated by Pastor Carlton Lee's calls for Officer Darren Wilson's arrest and his participation in Al Sharpton's National Action Network. Pastor Lee died of an apparent heart attack in 2017, at the age of 34.
- 2015 June 17 At Emanuel African Methodist Episcopal Church in Charleston, South Carolina, 10 African Americans, including Clementa C. Pinckney, member of the South Carolina Senate, were shot in a mass shooting; nine were killed. White supremacist and neo-Nazi Dylann Roof pled guilty to murder and was sentenced to nine consecutive life sentences without parole.
- 2015 June 22 At College Hill Seventh Day Adventist, in Knoxville, Tennessee, a small fire was set, resulting in minimal damage to the church structure and destruction of the church van. The act was not classified as a hate crime.
- 2015 June 23 God's Power Church of Christ in Macon, Georgia, was gutted by a fire which was ruled arson.
- 2015 June 24 At Briar Creek Baptist Church in Charlotte, North Carolina, an unknown arsonist started a three-alarm fire, causing more than $250,000 in damages.
- 2016 November 1 The 111-year-old Hopewell Missionary Baptist Church in Greenville, Mississippi, was burned and vandalized with the words "Vote Trump" spray-painted onto the building. The arsonist, a black man who was a member of the church, pled guilty in March 2019.
- 2019 March 26 St. Mary Baptist Church in Port Barre, Louisiana. This was the first in a series of three historically black churches over 100 years old, burned within a span of 10 days. Holden Matthews, 21, the son of a St. Landry Parish sheriff's deputy, was charged with the arson. Matthews reportedly was not motivated by race but rather by anti-Christian animus and a desire to promote himself as a black metal musician in the mold of Varg Vikernes, who committed a similar series of church burnings in 1990s Norway. On November 2, 2020, Matthews was sentenced to 25 years in prison and ordered to pay the churches $2.6 million.
- 2019 April 2 Greater Union Baptist Church in Opelousas, Louisiana. Holden Matthews was charged with the arson.
- 2019 April 4 Mount Pleasant Baptist Church in Opelousas, Louisiana. Holden Matthews was charged with the arson.
- 2022 November 8 Two churches, Greater Bethlehem Temple Church and Epiphany Church, in Jackson, Mississippi burned overnight. Both fires, in addition to 5 others set the same night, were deemed the work of an arsonist.
- 2025 April 28 Clayborn Temple Church in Downtown Memphis burned in the early morning hours. Memphis fire officials advised that it would "take some time" to find out the fire's cause because of the significant damage to the building. The church was a central meeting place during the Civil Rights Movement but closed in 1999. The building was undergoing renovation at the time of the fire.

The church is notable for being pivotal in the final days of Martin Luther King Jr.'s life and the iconic I Am a Man! posters were printed in its basement.

== See also ==
- List of attacks against houses of worship in the United States
- List of attacks against Latter-day Saint churches
- List of attacks on Jewish institutions
- List of cases of church arson
- List of mass shootings in the United States

== Notes ==
- Story Map: Mapping Violence Against African American Churches
- Associated Press (1996-06-20). "List of Burned Black Churches". Washington Post.
- Finley, Taryn (2015-06-23). "The Charleston Shooting Was At Least The 91st Violent Attack On A Black Church Since 1956". Huff Post Black Voices.
- "List of racially-motivated bombings". BHAM Wiki.
- Temple, Chanda; Jeff Hansen (2000-07-16). "Ministers' homes, churches among bomb targets". Alabama Media Group. Archived from the original on 2015-07-01.
