= Lake Worth Church fire =

1999 fire in Lake Worth, Texas, United States

- Date: February 15, 1999
- Location: Lake Worth, Texas, United States; 32.8065°N 97.4117°W
- Type: Fire
- Cause: Suspected arson
- Deaths: 3 firefighters

The Lake Worth Church fire occurred in 1999 in Lake Worth, Texas, United States. On February 15, 1999, firefighters in Lake Worth, Texas, and surrounding towns were alerted to a fire in a church on Roberts Cut Off Road in the area of Cowden Street just before 11 A.M. The roof of the church would eventually collapse, trapping five firefighters inside, three of whom would die before they could be rescued. Four firefighters were also on the roof performing ventilation operations when it collapsed below them.

== The fire ==
=== Early stages ===
The fire started in a shed to the northeast of the church. Heavy winds caused the fire to spread to the roof area of the church. Inside the fire spread throughout the enclosed attic area. The fire was noticed by a police officer in neighboring Samson Park, and he reported to his dispatcher. The dispatcher then notified the Samson Park fire department under the impression that the fire was in their jurisdiction. At the same time a Lake Worth water department worker noticed the fire and notified his dispatcher who in turn notified the Lake Worth fire department. With all of the notifications, a total of six fire departments were dispatched to the fire.

The first two arriving fire engines deployed a total of four 1.75 inches (40 mm) handlines, with three being deployed on the interior of the building. A crew of three firefighters (two from Lake Worth and one from Samson Park) made their way to the east end of the church from the church's front entrance on the west end. They went down the center aisle toward the sanctuary in the southeastern corner behind the altar. The fire was located in the attic area, and they starting extinguishing it, with the help of two more firefighters from the River Oaks fire department.

=== Collapse and rescue ===
As the interior crews started their interior attack of the fire, four firefighters made their way to the roof to begin ventilation operations. While the ladder crews were venting the roof, it collapsed below them. One firefighter landed next to the main entrance after falling through the roof. Another firefighter held onto a wall and was pulled up by the other two firefighters that were on the only part of the roof that didn't collapse.

Initially only two firefighters were reported as being missing. The rescue team reported that they could not enter the building due to the worsening conditions. They were instructed to enter from the fellowship hall located on the southeast corner of the building. After entering through the fellowship hall, they located two disoriented firefighters inside. Another accountability check was then ordered after the two were removed from the building. This check concluded that there were still two trapped inside.

Another crew from River Oaks arrived on scene and began a new search for the missing firefighters. One firefighter was found in the entrance to the offices at the rear of the sanctuary and after making their way further into the office a second firefighter was found. Accountability reports on scene indicated that two firefighters were missing and both were from River Oaks, Brian Collins and Phillip Dean. It was believed at this time that all missing firefighters has been found and that they were Collins and Dean.

Unfortunately during further overhaul the body of a third firefighter was found in the hallway further into the sanctuary. An exhaustive search was begun to try to determine who the third firefighter was. It was not until the Sansom Park Engine returned to their station that they realized that Firefighter Sanders has responded with them but had not returned with them. After further investigation it was determined that another Sansom Park firefighter had shown up on scene in their private vehicle and was using the gear of another firefighter who had become ill in the initial stages of the fire. When accountability reports were initially called for the Sansom Park officer only counted firefighters in Sansom Park gear and did not account for the actual individuals that had responded with them.

Autopsy reports confirmed that the three firefighters were Collins and Dean from River Oaks and Sanders from Sansom Park. It was further determined that Gary Sanders was the initial firefighter that was found by Phillip Dean. Brian Collins was the firefighter found later.

=== Origin and cause ===
The fire started in the shed outside the building to the northeast. The fire was reported as incendiary in nature, with no suspects being arrested as of 2001.

=== Conclusions ===
Based on the fire investigation and analysis, the NFPA has determined that the following significant factors may have contributed to the deaths of the three fire fighters:

- Lack of a proper building/incident size-up (risk vs. benefit analysis)
- Lack of compatible accountability systems among mutual aid departments
- Absence of an established rapid intervention crew (RIC)
- Lack of use of Personal Alert Safety Systems (PASS)
- Lack of subdivision in combustible attic space

== Timeline ==
Actual Time	Elapsed Time	Activity
10:42 AM	0:00	Time of call
10:44 AM	2:00	Samson Park Engine E225 & Lake Worth Engine E210 arrive.
10:52 AM	10:00	Roof collapse. Second alarm sounded.
11:00 AM — 12:00 PM	18:00 — 1.18:00	Search for three missing fire fighters begins.
1:00 PM	2.18:00	Arson Task Force, Red Cross, and counselors begin to arrive.
2:53 PM	4.11:00	Recovery of victims begins.

== The firefighters ==
Name	Age	About
Brian Collins	35	Career firefighter with Fort Worth volunteering at the River Oaks VFD. Wife and three children.
Phillip Dean	29	Career firefighter with Fort Worth volunteering at the River Oaks VFD. Wife and one child.
Garry Sanders	20	Volunteer with the Sansom Park VFD. Had been a firefighter for only a few years.

== See also ==
- Church arson
