= Macedonia Baptist Church arson =

Historic black church burned down by the KKK in South Carolina

Coordinates: 33.5656°N 80.1393°W

The Macedonia Baptist Church is a centuries-old historically black church located in rural Clarendon County, South Carolina. It was destroyed by arsonists following direction from the local Ku Klux Klan chapter known as the Christian Knights of the Ku Klux Klan and was later rebuilt. Four Klansmen were convicted for the crime, and a subsequent civil suit effectively closed the Klan chapter's operation in the county. The successful civil suit was called a "wake-up call" indicating that racial violence would not be tolerated.

== Background ==
In 1994 the Christian Knights of the Ku Klux Klan (a South Carolina branch of the Ku Klux Klan) set up headquarters in a field near the church, proclaiming that black churches taught their congregations how to manipulate the welfare system and procure government subsidies. The church congregation could hear the Klan's sermons blaring from the building next door on megaphones.

== Arson and investigation ==
On June 21, 1995, Timothy Adron Welch and Gary Christopher Cox of the Christian Knights of the Ku Klux Klan poured gasoline on the floor of the Macedonian Baptist Church and set it on fire. The church was one of several rural black churches burned by arsonists in the mid-1990s. The crimes prompted president Bill Clinton to visit South Carolina in 1996 and pledge federal help in investigating the crimes. Due to the possibility that the arson violated federal civil rights hate crime laws, the arson case was investigated by the FBI.

Welch and Cox were apprehended in connection to a stabbing assault on a black man on June 16. The two were charged with assault and battery with intent to kill, first-degree arson, and second-degree burglary of the Mount Zion AME Church in Greeleyville, SC.

== Trials ==
=== Criminal trial ===
Welch, Cox, and two older accomplices, Arthur Haley and Hubert Rowell were indicted on several charges of civil rights violations involving the burning of the Macedonian Baptist Church and other racially charged crimes. Haley and Rowell were also charged with burning a Hispanic migrant camp in Manning, SC, burning a car of a black Manning resident, and illegally possessing firearms. The federal indictment said that Haley selected the Macedonian Baptist Church as the arson target and Rowell instructed Cox and Welch on how to set the fire. All four defendants pleaded guilty to the charges. They received federal prison sentences ranging from 12 to 21.5 years.

James E. Johnson and Isabelle Katz Pinzler, co-chairs of the National Church Arson Task Force commended the work of officials and investigators in the case. J. Rene Josey, U.S. attorney for the District of South Carolina, said "Today's sentences should serve as a wake-up call to those individuals who may consider the unlawful use of force and violence to intimidate persons based on their race and religious beliefs."

The sentences for Cox and Welch were reduced to 12 years in prison for testifying in the civil suit against the Klan.

=== Civil suit ===
A subsequent civil case trial was held in 1998 with the charges that the Ku Klux Klan incited the crime. The case was brought to court by the Southern Poverty Law Center, represented by attorney Morris Dees. The lawyer for the Klan insisted that the criminals acted alone in burning down the church. Defense attorney Gary White painted the Klan Grand Dragon Horace King as a feeble old man merely exercising his right to free speech, saying King never authorized the arson. During the trial, the Church's lawyers showed racist Klan posters and literature and played a videotape for the jury showing King speaking at a Klan rally, saying "It's time, people, to wake up and shape up and say this is our country, white people, take it back." The Klan leaders insisted that they never encouraged anyone to break the law, but two of the sentenced arsonists testified against their case. Welch testified, "The church fire was Klan business, and we were told we would not go to jail. We were convinced we were untouchable." Both Welch and Cox said that they testified against the Klan to atone for what they'd done.

The case was decided by nine black and three white jurors. On July 24, 1998, the jury deliberated for just 45 minutes before it returned a decision that the Ku Klux Klan must pay $37.8 million, $12.6 million more than even lawyers for the church requested. The verdict included $300,000 in actual damages and $37.5 million in punitive damages. King was ordered to pay $15 million, as was the Christian Knights of the Ku Klux Klan Inc. of North Carolina. The Christian Knights' South Carolina affiliate was ordered to pay $7 million, while the four men in prison were ordered to pay $100,000 to $200,000 each. The judgement was the largest ever awarded against a hate group. The amount was later reduced to $21.5 million. King's "tiny house, a shed, a chicken coop and seven acres in rural Lexington County" were sold, and he died in the early 2000s.

== Aftermath ==
On the day the verdict was read, Welch's younger brother Richard stated that he blamed the Klan for changing his brother. He said he was happy with the verdict and hoped that it would be enough to keep the Klan away from their town.

The civil suit forced the Klan to surrender the land on which its headquarters were built. When the property was sold, the deed included a restriction that the land never be used for white supremacist activities. The SPLC credits this judgement with reducing "one of the most active Klan groups in the nation to a defunct organization."

After the suit, King stated publicly that he was sorry anyone ever connected with his group was involved in the arson, he refused to admit personal guilt or apologize for inciting the crime. He claimed that he would continue to fight to proclaim his innocence.

The Macedonian Baptist Church was later fully rebuilt.

Forgotten Fires, a film about the fires and subsequent trials was produced by Michael Chandler & Vivian Kleiman in 1998. The church and trials were discussed in Standing on Holy Ground, a book by Sandra E. Johnson about the spate of arsons targeting black churches in rural South Carolina.

== See also ==
- List of attacks against African-American churches
- Charleston church shooting, an infamous instance of a violent attack on a black church in which Emanuel African Methodist Episcopal Church in Charleston, South Carolina had nine congregants killed by Dylann Roof on June 17, 2015.
- 16th Street Baptist Church bombing, another infamous incident involving Ku Klux Klan members committing violence against the 16th Street Baptist Church in Birmingham, Alabama on September 15, 1963, resulting in four female African-Americans dead and twenty-two injured.
