= 2010 East Texas church burnings =

Series of arson attacks in Texas, USA

In January and February 2010, 10 churches were burned in East Texas.

Two local men, Jason Bourque and Daniel McAllister, were arrested and pleaded guilty. Bourque was sentenced to life and 20 years in prison, and McAllister received a life sentence.

== Timeline ==
- January 1 – Little Hope Baptist Church, Canton – ruled accident until investigation, later ruled arson
- January 1 – Faith Church, Athens – ruled arson
- January 12 – Lake Athens Baptist Church – burned
- January 12 – Grace Community Church, Athens – burned
- January 16 – Tyland Baptist Church in Tyler – torched
- January 17 – First Church of Christ, Scientist in Tyler – burned to the ground
- January 20 – Prairie Creek Fellowship of Lindale on Highway 69 – arson
- February 4 – Russell Memorial United Methodist Church in Wills Point (Van Zandt County) – destroyed the sanctuary (ATF soon confirmed the fire was the result of arson)
- 8:30 PM on February 8 – Dover Baptist Church on Highway 110 outside Lindale – mostly destroyed
- 9:30 on February 8 – Clear Spring Missionary Baptist Church, on CR 426 near the Smith-Van Zandt county line – found burning

== Suspects ==
A sketch was released of three persons of interest.

On February 21, 2010, Jason Robert Bourque, 19, of Lindale, and Daniel George McAllister, 21, of Ben Wheeler were charged in connection with the Dover Baptist Church burning that occurred on February 8. Their bond was set at $10 million. As they targeted places of worship, the crime is a first-degree felony carrying a maximum penalty of 99 years to life.

Bourque was raised by his devout Christian maternal grandparents, while McAllister was homeschooled for religious reasons. Per The New York Times both men started to question their faith. Bourque's is attributed to his dropping-out from the University of Texas, and McAllister's after the death of his mother and trouble finding work.

Faced with large amounts of evidence, both men pleaded guilty. On January 14, 2011, Judge Christi Kennedy sentenced Bourque to life and 20 years in prison, and McAllister to a life sentence.

On February 11, 2011, Bourque was interviewed by KLTV 7 from Smith County Jail. He blamed the drug Chantix, which he used to aid his quitting smoking, for psychotic episodes. He also claimed that McAllister had led the wave, targeting churches as he found them corrupt. Bourque stated that God had forgiven him.

== Cultural legacy ==
Theo Love's documentary, Little Hope Was Arson, interviews community members in East Texas reacting to the burning of the 10 churches.

== See also ==
- Church arson
