= Atlanta sit-ins =

Series of protests against racial segregation in Atlanta, Georgia

- Part of the Sit-in movement in the Civil Rights Movement
- Date: March 15, 1960 – March 7, 1961 (11 months, 2 weeks and 6 days)
- Location: Atlanta, Georgia, United States
- Caused by: Racial segregation in Atlanta
- Methods: Sit-ins

The Atlanta sit-ins were a series of sit-ins that took place in Atlanta, Georgia, United States. Occurring during the sit-in movement of the larger civil rights movement, the sit-ins were organized by the Committee on Appeal for Human Rights, which consisted of students from the Atlanta University Center. The sit-ins were inspired by the Greensboro sit-ins, which had started a month earlier in Greensboro, North Carolina with the goal of desegregating the lunch counters in the city. The Atlanta protests lasted for almost a year before an agreement was made to desegregate the lunch counters in the city.

== Background ==
In February 1960, during the civil rights movement in the United States, four African American college students refused to leave their seats at a segregated lunch counter in Greensboro, North Carolina, starting the Greensboro sit-ins. These sit-ins inspired similar activity in other cities throughout the Southern United States, collectively referred to as the sit-in movement. In Atlanta, student activists from the city's six historically black colleges and universities began to organize and discuss possible protest activity in the city. Student leaders Julian Bond and Lonnie C. King Jr. (both students at Morehouse College) pushed for similar sit-in action in the city. However, before any activity commenced, the student leaders were called before a meeting of the Council of Presidents of the Atlanta University Center (AUC), who officially endorsed the sit-in activity, but urged the student leaders to announce their plans in writing beforehand. Shortly thereafter, the students formed the Committee on Appeal for Human Rights (COAHR, led by King and Spelman College student Herschelle Sullivan) and wrote An Appeal for Human Rights, which was published in The Atlanta Constitution, the Atlanta Daily World, and The Atlanta Journal on March 9, 1960. In the document, the students outlined their opposition to segregation and their plans to "use every legal and nonviolent means at our disposal to secure full citizenship rights as members of this great Democracy of ours." The appeal was attacked by Georgia Governor Ernest Vandiver as a "left wing statement... calculated to breed dissatisfaction, discontent, discord, and evil," and Georgia's two U.S. Senators (Herman Talmadge and Richard Russell Jr.) both also opposed the sit-ins. Meanwhile, Atlanta Mayor William B. Hartsfield thanked the students for voicing their opinions, but took no immediate steps to address the problems they brought up.

== Course of the protests ==
The sit-ins began on March 15, about a week after the publishing of the appeal. At 11 a.m. that day, approximately 200 students targeted numerous establishments across the city, including cafeterias in the Atlanta City Hall, the Fulton County Courthouse, and the Georgia State Capitol. Additionally, Morehouse students Charles Black and A. D. King (a brother of civil rights leader Martin Luther King Jr.) led students to the cafeteria at Terminal Station. Overall, ten lunch counters and cafeterias across the city were targeted, with 77 of the 200 involved students arrested, including Black and Bond. Despite this, the sit-ins remained peaceful, with the organizers calling them a success and temporarily suspending them during negotiations with representatives from Atlanta's business community. However, the business representatives were unwilling to compromise, and sit-ins continued until May, when they were more or less suspended due to summer vacation. During this time, little progress was made.

Protest planning started again in late summer 1960 after classes at the colleges were back in session. COAHR decided to postpone the sit-ins until October in order to coincide with the 1960 United States presidential election, hoping to bring national attention to the protests. Additionally, there had been developments the previous spring that would affect the next round of sit-ins. In April 1960, civil rights activist Ella Baker of the Southern Christian Leadership Conference (SCLC) had talked to student activists in North Carolina and helped form the Student Nonviolent Coordinating Committee (SNCC), which would establish their headquarters in Atlanta in the fall. Following this, the COAHR would work in conjunction with the SNCC, with plans to hold larger protests in the city.

In early October, Lonnie King asked Martin Luther King Jr. (no relation) if he could participate in the sit-ins, hoping that his presence would increase attention on the protests. Martin agreed, and on October 19, he participated in a massive wave of sit-ins across the city. Martin and Lonnie went to the lunch counter inside Rich's department store, where both of them were promptly arrested. In total, 50 protestors, including A. D. King, were arrested during the first day of protests. Martin Luther King's arrest drew national attention, and this attention may have contributed to increased protest turnout, with over 2,000 protestors performing sit-ins at 16 locations the following day. Protests continued into the next month, and on Black Friday of that year, AUC students were joined by some white students from Agnes Scott College and Emory University. The next day, about 100 members of the Ku Klux Klan, dressed in their regalia, held a counter protest in front of Rich's.

The sit-ins continued throughout the holiday shopping season, and by the end of the year, a report noted that there had been a 13% decrease in sales that year compared to 1959, indicating that the sit-ins were having an economic impact. The following year, the protest leaders announced a new plan to overcrowd the jails, with over 100 protestors arrested in February. Around this time, Sullivan announced that COAHR was planning to extend the protests until at least Easter and were additionally seeking help from U.S. President John F. Kennedy and U.S. Attorney General Robert F. Kennedy in desegregating the city. On February 19, a planned rally at the county jail was called off by COAHR after A. T. Walden and William Holmes Borders, prominent leaders in the black community at that time, instead asked protest leaders to meet with them at Wheat Street Baptist Church to discuss the future of the protests. Following this, Walden began to negotiate with business officials (including Atlanta Chamber of Commerce leader Ivan Allen Jr.) regarding terms for an end to the protest. On March 7, Lonnie King and Sullivan attended a meeting where they were told that an agreement had been reached wherein lunch counters and restaurants would be desegregated after the public schools were integrated in Fall of that year in exchange for an end to the sit-ins. Student leaders were unhappy with the terms of the agreement, in particular the fact that the desegregation would not be immediate. In anger, King Sr. told Lonnie King, "Boy, I'm tired of you! This is the best agreement that we can get out of this". The students ultimately acquiesced, and the sit-ins ended. The agreement, while lauded by The Atlanta Constitution and the Atlanta Daily World, was considered unpopular among many African Americans in Atlanta.

== Aftermath ==
One notable effect of the sit-ins in Atlanta was the straining of the relationship between the established black elite in the city, who were more conservative in their approach to the civil rights movement, and younger activists who were more assertive and less willing to compromise. For instance, older leaders in Atlanta had originally been opposed to the sit-ins, and King Sr. had been opposed to his son's involvement with the sit-ins. On March 10, a meeting was held at Warren Memorial Methodist Church, attended by about 1,500 people, to discuss the agreement. There, notable leaders such as Borders, King Sr., and Walden were criticized and heckled by many, leading King Jr. to give an address promoting unity.

In October 1961, following the integration of the school system, the lunch counters and restaurants in Atlanta were desegregated. By this point, over 100 cities throughout the Southern United States had already desegregated their eateries, and the New Georgia Encyclopedia highlights later sit-in actions in Savannah and Rome, Georgia to argue that "Atlanta actually lagged behind many of its neighbors in desegregating local institutions". According to historian Stephen Tuck, desegregation in the city would remain "piecemeal and sporadic" until the Civil Rights Act of 1964.

== See also ==
- Timeline of the civil rights movement

== Sources ==
- Brown-Nagin, Tomiko (2011). Courage to Dissent: Atlanta and the Long History of the Civil Rights Movement. Oxford University Press. ISBN 978-0-19-993201-6 – via Google Books.
- Burns, Rebecca (March 1, 2010). "The Atlanta Student Movement: A Look Back". Atlanta. Archived from the original on November 17, 2020.
- Hatfield, Edward A. (May 28, 2008). "Atlanta Sit-ins". New Georgia Encyclopedia. Archived from the original on December 23, 2020.
- Schmidt, Christopher W. (2018). The Sit-Ins: Protest and Legal Change in the Civil Rights Era. University of Chicago Press. ISBN 978-0-226-52258-6 – via Google Books.
