= The Atlanta Inquirer =

African-American newspaper published in Atlanta, Georgia, USA

Atlanta Inquirer
- Type: Weekly newspaper
- Founded: July 31, 1960
- Headquarters: 947 Martin Luther King Jr Dr NW Atlanta, Georgia 30314
- ISSN: 2574-867X
- OCLC number: 6657707
- Website: atlinq.com

The Atlanta Inquirer was founded on July 31, 1960 by Jesse Hill, Herman J. Russell, and various students of the Atlanta Student Movement including Julian Bond, Charlayne Hunter-Gault, Lonnie King, and many other students in the Atlanta University Center. It was the second black newspaper published in Atlanta. M. Carl Holman, a professor at Clark College, became the editor of the newspaper after the first issue, which had been edited by Bill Strong. The paper was a radical response to the conservative Atlanta Daily World which was the first black newspaper in Atlanta.The Inquirer reported on black leadership in the civil rights movement in Atlanta. After being bought by the family of a longtime employee of the paper, John B. Smith Sr., he became the publisher, editor, and chief executive officer of the newspaper until his death in 2017. The Atlanta Inquirer is also a member of the National Newspaper Association where John B. Smith Sr. was the chairman.
