= Sheila Pree Bright =

American photographer

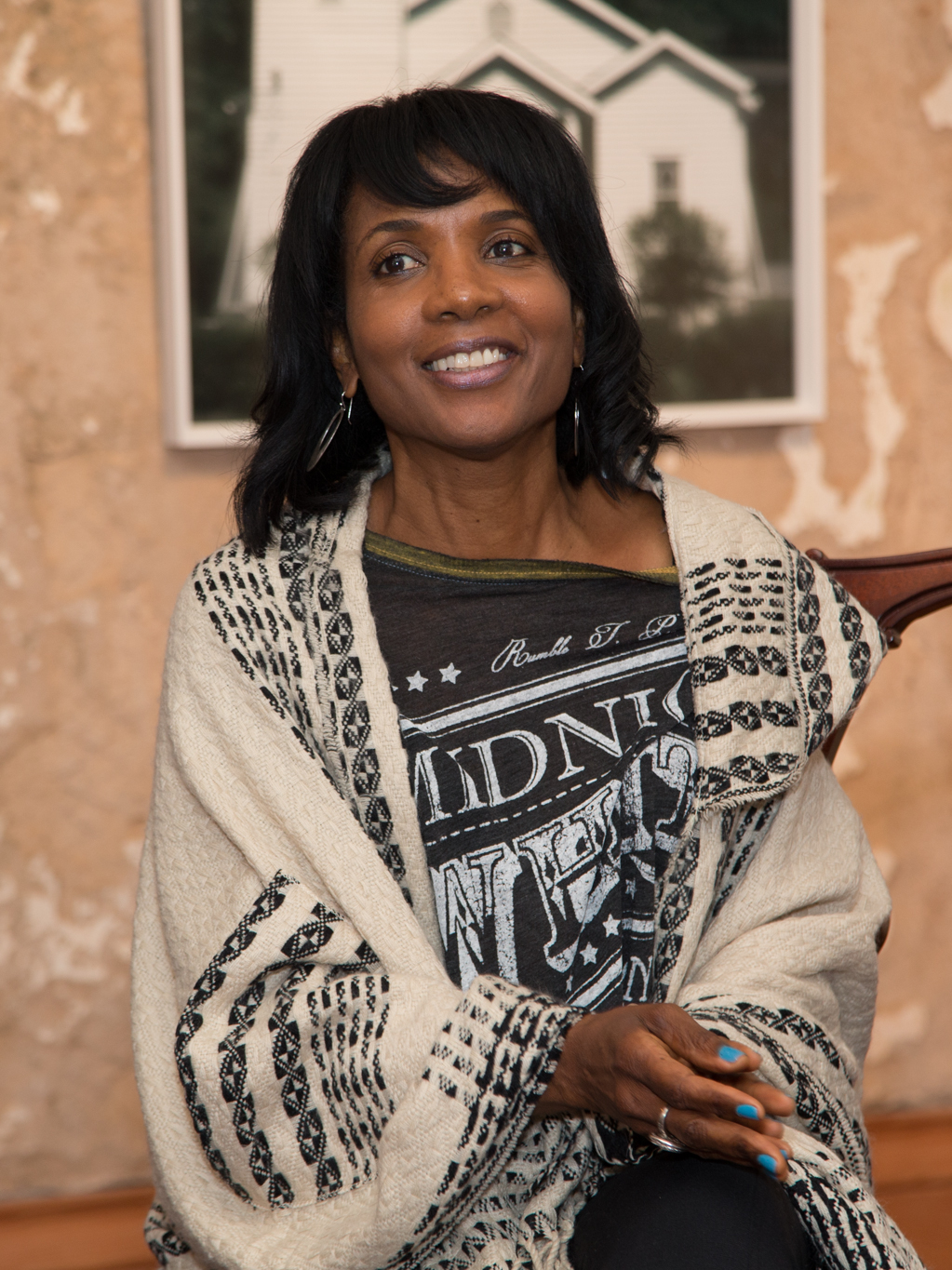
- Known for: Fine Art Photography
- Movement: Photography
- Website: http://www.sheilapreebright.com/

Sheila Pree Bright is an Atlanta-based, award-winning American photographer best known for her works Plastic Bodies, Suburbia, Young Americans and her most recent series #1960Now. Sheila is the author of #1960Now: Photographs of Civil Rights Activist and Black Lives Matter Protest published by Chronicle Books.

== Early life and education ==
Sheila Pree Bright was born in Waycross, GA. As a member of a military family, she spent her early childhood in Germany and later moved back to the United States, moving between several states including Colorado and Kansas. None of these locations had significant black populations, a fact that later influenced her work. She earned a bachelor of science degree from the University of Missouri in 1998. Her initial interest in photography began while taking a photography class during her senior year of college. She moved to Atlanta in 1998 and received a master of fine arts degree from Georgia State University in 2003.

== Career ==
Bright is often described as a "cultural anthropologist." Her earliest experience as a photographer began when she spent time in Houston where she began photographing the gangsta rap scene and confronting the dynamic between hip hop and gun culture. In 2003, she created her MFA thesis photo series, Plastic Bodies, which was featured in the film Through the Lens Darkly and went viral on Huffington Post in 2013. In these photographs, she manipulated images of black women and Barbie dolls in an attempt to challenge the western ideals of whiteness and beauty and explore the impact these ideals have on girls and women of color. Bright later earned national acclaim when she won the Center Prize at the Santa Fe Center of Photography in 2006 for her Suburbia series, which features images of African American suburban life. In 2008, she had her first solo exhibition at the High Museum of Art, featuring her series Young Americans. These photographers were a response to the commonly negative portrayals of Millennials. She allowed her subjects to use their own props, clothes, and poses in an attempt to "give them a platform to speak for themselves."

Bright was selected for the Museum of Contemporary of Art of Georgia's Working Artist Project in 2014, during which she created her series 1960Who. In this work, she created portraits of several civil rights activists of the 1960s and 1970s, including Dr. Roslyn Pope, Lonnie King, Herman Russel, Charles Person, and Claire O'Connor. In addition to the museum exhibition, she plastered these portraits on large public walls throughout downtown Atlanta in honor and celebration of their activism. In 2014 and 2015, Bright visited Ferguson and Baltimore after the murders of Michael Brown and Freddie Gray to photograph and document the protests. These photos led to her series #1960Now. Bright’s book, #1960Now, was published by Chronicle Books on October 16, 2018.

#1960Now series is now in the collection of the Smithsonian African American History and Culture Museum, Washington, DC; The High Museum of Art Atlanta; The Center for Civil and Human Rights, Atlanta, GA; City of Atlanta, Mayor's Office of Cultural Affairs and the Pyramid Peak Foundation, Memphis, TN.

== Work ==
=== Collections ===
- Smithsonian National Museum of African American History, Washington, DC
- Oppenheimer Collection: Nerman Museum of Contemporary Art, Overland, KS
- National Center for Civil and Human Rights, Atlanta, GA
- de Saisset Museum, Santa Clara University, Santa Clara, CA
- BET Collection, New York, NY
- Library of Congress, Washington DC
- Sprint PCS Art Collection, Sprint Corporation, Overland, KS
- The Amistad Center for Art & Culture at The Wadsworth Atheneum Museum of Art, Hartford CT
- Diggs Gallery, Winston-Salem State University, Winston-Salem, NC
- The Paul Jones Collection, Birmingham, AL
- High Museum of Art, Atlanta GA
- Museum of Contemporary Art, Atlanta, GA
- King & Spalding Art Collection, Atlanta GA
- Lucinda Bunnen Photography, Atlanta, GA
- Clark Atlanta University Galleries, Atlanta, GA
- Spelman Museum of Fine Art, Atlanta, GA
- Hammond House Museum, Atlanta GA

=== Awards ===
- 2019 PNC Bank & WCLK Honor Atlanta's African American Artistic Community, Atlanta, GA
- 2018 SPE Imagemaker Award, Cleveland, OH
- 2015 Proclamation, Atlanta City Council, Atlanta, GA
- 2012 Delta Sigma Theta Celebration of Women Torch Award, Atlanta, GA
- 2010 Save The Art Awards, Greensboro, NC
- 2009 The Loridans Arts Encouragement Award, Atlanta, GA
- 2006 Santa Fe Prize, Santa Fe Center for Photography, Santa Fe, NM
- 2001 National Bronica Award, Tamron USA, New York, NY
- 1999 New Works Photography Award, En Foco, Inc., Bronx, NY
