= List of former Atlanta street names =

From its founding in 1847, Atlanta has had a penchant for frequent street renamings, even in the central business district, usually to honor the recently deceased. As early as 1903 (see section below), there were concerns about the confusion this caused, as "more than 225 streets of Atlanta have had from two to eight names" in the first decades of the city.

Many recent Atlanta street renamings commemorate prominent African Americans in Atlanta's history. These renamings can be identified by the use of the person's full name (e.g., Rev. Dr. Joseph E. Lowery Boulevard) rather than the more traditional last name only (e.g., Cain Street).

According to local and state rules and regulations, street renamings must have support of 75% of property owners along that street, and state guides advise against using proper names as street names. However, these rules and procedures are usually ignored or waived, as demonstrated by the recent Ted Turner Drive at Historic Spring Street renaming resolution by the Atlanta City Council.

== Name changes ==
- Current name
  - Former name(s)

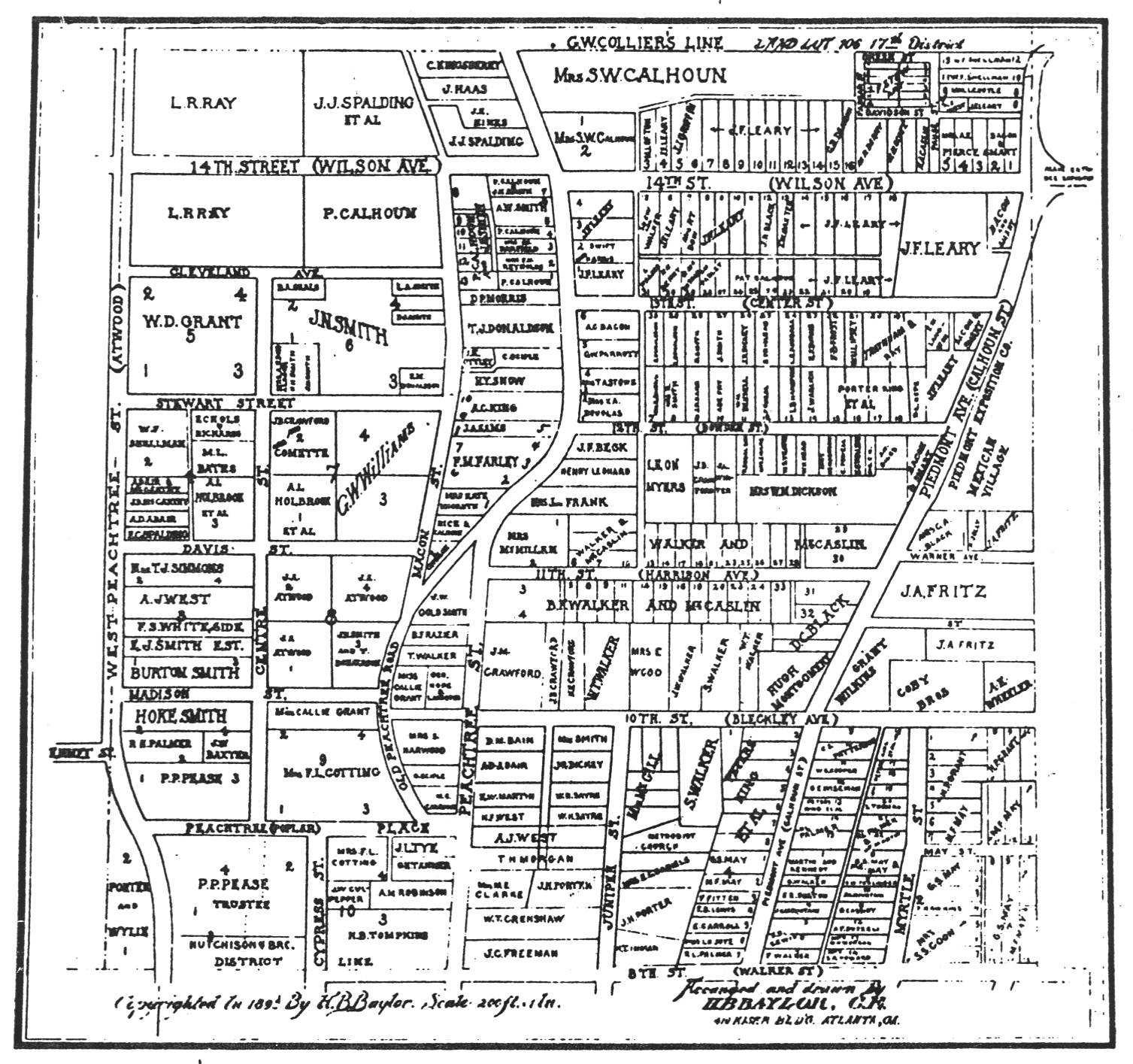
Map including alternative street names in what is now Midtown Atlanta, 1895

- 10th St.
  - Bleckley Ave. (alternative name, 1890s, Piedmont Avenue to Peachtree); Madison (between Crescent and West Peachtree)
- 11th St.
  - Harrison Ave. (alternative name, 1890s, Piedmont to Peachtree); Davis (between Crescent and West Peachtree)
- 12th St.
  - Downe St. (alternative name, 1890s, Piedmont to Peachtree); Stewart (between Crescent and West Peachtree)
- 13th St.
  - Center St. (alternative name, 1890s, Piedmont to Peachtree); Cleveland Street (between Crescent and West Peachtree)
- 14th St.
  - Wilson Ave. (alternative name, 1890s)
- Andrew J. Hairston Pl. (as of April 30, 2014)
  - Newport Street
- Andrew Young International Boulevard
  - International Boulevard
  - Cain Street (for pioneer John J. Cain)
  - Magnolia Street (1886 map, one block section between Marietta St. and railroad tracks)
- Argonne Ave. (Midtown)
  - Bedford Place (Bedford Place continued south to Forrest Ave., now Ralph McGill; that portion is now called Central Park Place)
- Atlanta Student Movement Boulevard
  - Fair Street (Pertains to the 14 blocks of Fair Street between Northside Drive and James P. Brawley Drive (formerly Chestnut Street).
- Auburn Avenue (as of April 17, 1893)
  - Wheat Street (for Augustus W. Wheat)
- Barnett Avenue (Virginia Highland/Poncey-Highland)
  - Kearsarge Avenue
- Benjamin E. Mays Drive
  - Sewell Road
- Briarcliff Road (Atkins Park/Virginia Highland)
  - Williams Mill Road (for Frederick A. Williams)
  - Stillwood Avenue
- Bolton Road
  - River Road, roughly parallel to the Chattahoochee River
- Broad Street
  - Bridge Street
- Boulevard
  - Jefferson Street (marked in 1878 map - section from North Ave. to Foster St. (now Edgewood Ave.) in today's Old Fourth Ward)
  - Rolling Mill Street (north of the railroad) from the late 1860s to about 1880, for the Confederate Rolling Mill, which the retreating Confederate army inadvertently destroyed in 1864
  - See also Monroe Drive below
- Cameron M. Alexander Blvd. (English Avenue neighborhood)
  - Kennedy Street (until 2010)
- Camilla St. SW
  - Carolina Ave
- Capitol Avenue (as of 1885)
  - McDonough Boulevard (for the town it eventually reaches)
- Carroll Street
  - Factory Street (1892 Bird's eye view and 1906 map)
- Centennial Olympic Park Drive (from North Avenue south to around Mitchell Street)
  - Techwood Drive (from North Avenue into Georgia Tech campus)
  - Orme Street (from around North Avenue south to Cain St. (now Andrew Young Intl. Blvd.)
  - Walker Street (from around Mitchell Street south to Peters Street)
- Central Park Place (Old Fourth Ward)
  - Bedford Place
- Charles Allen Drive (Midtown)
  - Parkway or Parkwood Drive, prior to that Jackson St.
- Cleburne Avenue
  - Augusta Avenue (1906 map)
- Courtland Street (as of September 20, 1886)
  - North Collins Street (for pioneer James Collins — renamed because of South Collins Street's reputation as a red light district)
- Crescent Avenue
  - Macon St., Old Peachtree Rd.
- Donald Lee Hollowell Parkway
  - Bankhead Highway (renamed in an effort to revitalize and mask the name stigma attached to this high-crime section of the city)
  - Bankhead Avenue (Changed to honor Senator Bankhead of Alabama)
  - Bellwood Avenue
  - Mayson & Turner's Ferry
- Edgewood Ave.
  - Foster St. (portion marked in 1878 map, from Calhoun (now Courtland) St. to just east to BeltLine in today's Old Fourth Ward)
- Euclid Terrace
  - Kuhns Street
- Eva Davis Way
  - East Lake Boulevard
- Felton Drive (for Rebecca Felton)
  - Summit Avenue
- Fulton Industrial Boulevard
  - Carroll Road
- Hamilton E. Holmes Drive
  - Hightower Road
- Hank Aaron Drive (from Fulton Street south to McDonough Boulevard/University Avenue)
  - Capitol Avenue
- Hosea L. Williams Drive
  - Boulevard Drive
- Ivan Allen Jr. Boulevard (from West Peachtree Street west to Marietta Street)
  - Simpson Street (for Leonard C. Simpson, Atlanta's first lawyer), Jones Avenue and Alexander Street (for Dr. James F. Alexander)
- James P. Brawley Drive
  - Chestnut Street
- Jesse Hill Jr. Drive
  - Butler Street
- John Portman Boulevard At Historic Harris Street (as per Atlanta City Council vote May 16, 2011)
  - Harris Street - (for Fulton County's first elected legislator)
- John Wesley Dobbs Avenue (for John Wesley Dobbs, African American civic and political leader, "mayor of Auburn Avenue")
  - Houston Street (pronounced HOW-stun) (for pioneer Oswald Houston)
- Joseph E. Boone Boulevard (as of March 24, 2008, for the civil rights activist)
  - Simpson Street/Road (for Leonard C. Simpson)
- Rev. Dr. Joseph E. Lowery Boulevard
  - Ashby Street (for Civil War General Turner Ashby)
- Leonard Tate Street
  - Bell Street
- Lindbergh Drive (Garden Hills) (as of 1927 for Charles Lindbergh, American aviator; from Peachtree Road to Piedmont Road)
  - Mayson Avenue
- Maiden Lane (Virginia Highland)
  - Grove Street
- Martin Luther King Jr. Drive
  - Hunter Street, Gordon Road
- Mackenzie Drive NE
  - Garfield Place
- Memorial Drive
  - Fair Street (for the South Central Agricultural Society fair, which moved to facilities on Fair St. in 1850)
- Metropolitan Parkway
  - Stewart Avenue (renamed because of redlight district reputation)
- Monroe Drive (to honor the Monroe Landscaping Company which did extensive plantings in the area)
  - N. Boulevard
- Moreland Avenue, after Major Asbury Fletcher Moreland (1828–1909), father-in-law of architect Willis F. Denny. The Moreland Park community also named after him is now part of Inman Park.
  - County Line Road
- Park Avenue West (as of April 20, 2001)
  - Foundry Street and Luckie Street (south of Baker Street - formerly Thurmond Street)
- Parkway Dr. (Old Fourth Ward)
  - Jackson St.
- Paschal Blvd. NW
  - Jeptha
- Peachtree Center Avenue
  - Ivy Street (for pioneer Hardy Ivy)
- Peachtree Street (south of railroad gulch)
  - Whitehall Street (for the Whitehall Tavern, a tavern/inn established in the 1830s)
- Peachtree Walk
  - Centre Street (from 1895 map)
  - Columbia Ave (from 1960s map)
- Piedmont Road / Piedmont Avenue
  - (Lindbergh/Buckhead area): Plaster's Bridge Road (or Plaster Bridge Road) for Benjamin Plaster who owned land between Piedmont and Peachtree around Lindbergh. Renamed Piedmont around 1915–1920.
  - (Midtown area): For the 1895 Cotton States Expo, Plaster's Bridge Road south of 10th street was rerouted to connect to an extension of Calhoun Street from downtown, all of which was renamed Piedmont Avenue.
- Ralph David Abernathy Boulevard
  - Gordon Street (for Civil War general John Brown Gordon)
- Ralph McGill Boulevard (for the Atlanta Constitution publisher who won the Pulitzer Prize for his anti-segregation editorials in 1969)
  - Forrest Avenue (for Civil War lieutenant general and first Grand Dragon of the Ku Klux Klan Nathan Bedford Forrest)
  - eastern portion just west of the BeltLine was Fortune St.
- Sidney Marcus Boulevard
  - Marian Road
- Seminole Avenue
  - Augusta Avenue (1906 map)
- Student Nonviolent Coordinating Committee (SNCC) Way (as of May 10, 2010)
  - Raymond Street
- T.P. Burruss Senior Dr. SW
  - Ashby Pl.
- Ted Turner Drive at Historic Spring Street
  - Spring Street (south of Alabama — for Walton Spring)
    - Madison Avenue
    - Thompson Street (for Dr. Joseph Thompson)
  - Spring Street (between Whitehall Street and West Peachtree in Downtown)
- Trinity Avenue
  - Peters Street (for Richard Peters)
- United Avenue
  - Confederate Avenue, changed in 2018 to remove references to the Confederate States of America; minor street Confederate Court off of it was renamed Trestletree Court, after the apartment complex it serves
- Washington Street
  - South Collins Street
- West Peachtree Street
  - Atwood Street (alternative name on 1895 map)
- William Holmes Borders Drive
  - Yonge Street

== List of street name changes prior to 1903 ==
On October 17, 1903, The Atlanta Constitution published the list shown below. Developer Forrest Adair had provided the Atlanta City Council this list of more than 225 streets whose names had been changed from the 1847 founding of the city up until that time. Some streets had experienced multiple renamings, bearing as many as nine different names, resulting in over 650 total names, such as:

- Haynes Street, 7th name, as of 1903, formerly named: 1) Manning Street; 2) Harris Street; 3) Booths Alley; 4) Hayden Street; 5) Markham Street, and; 6) Stewart Street
- Maple Street, 9th name, as of 1903, formerly named: 1) Porter Street; 2) Proctor Street; 3) Loyd Street; 4) Rock Street; 5) Love Street; 6) Howe Street; 7) Law Street, and; 8) Back Street

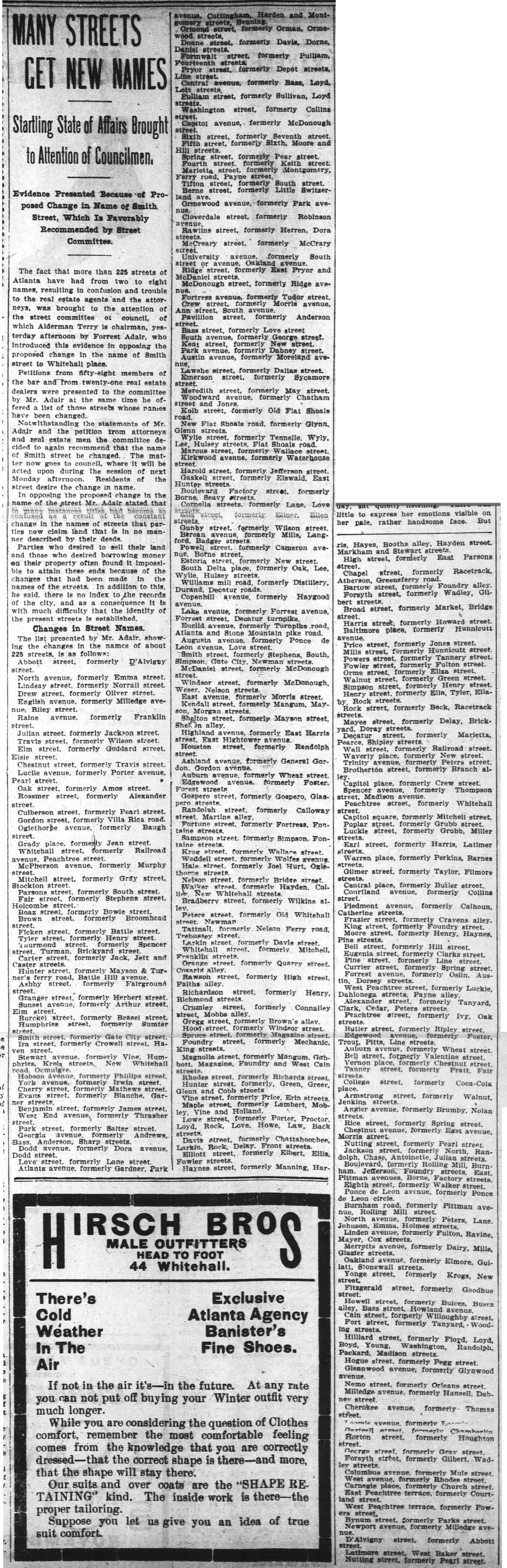

== Other street origins ==
- Baker Street (for Thomas Baker)
- Cone Street (for Reuben Cone)
- Ellis Street (for James M. Ellis)
- Robin Street (no longer exists)

== See also ==
- Viaducts of Atlanta
