= Committee on Appeal for Human Rights =

American Civil Rights group

The Committee on the Appeal for Human Rights (COAHR) was a group of Atlanta University Center students formed in February 1960. The committee drafted and published An Appeal for Human Rights on March 9, 1960. Six days after publication of the document, students in Atlanta united to start the Atlanta Student Movement and initiated the Atlanta sit-ins in order to demand racial desegregation as part of the Civil Rights Movement. Early members of the group include, among others, Lonnie King, Julian Bond, Herschelle Sullivan, Carolyn Long, Joseph Pierce.
