= David T. Howard High School =

David T. Howard Middle School
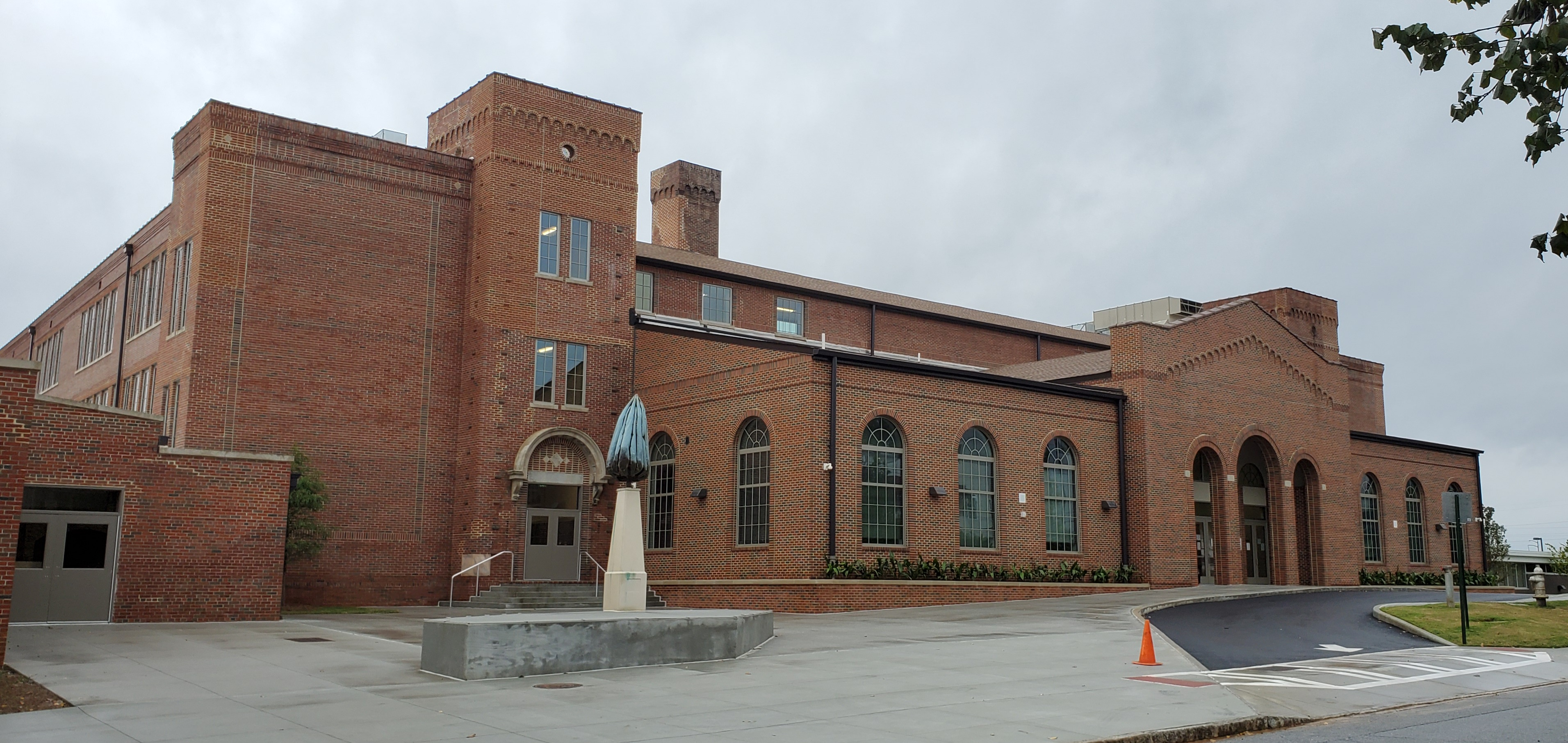
- David T. Howard Middle School (2020)

Location
- Old Fourth Ward, Atlanta, Georgia; United States; 33.758765°N 84.368801°W

Information
- Former name: David T. Howard High School
- School district: Atlanta Public Schools

David T. Howard High School was a school for African American students in Atlanta, Georgia. It has many prominent alumni. In 2018 the school was being renovated for a planned 2020 reopening as a middle school. Alumni include Martin Luther King Jr., Maynard Jackson who became Atlanta's first Black mayor, Walt Frazier who played basketball at the school, Lonnie King, Vernon Jordan, Clarence Cooper (judge), and gold medal-winning Olympian Mildred McDaniel Singleton. It is located at 551 John Wesley Dobbs Avenue. It was named for prominent businessman and philanthropist David Tobias Howard.

== History ==
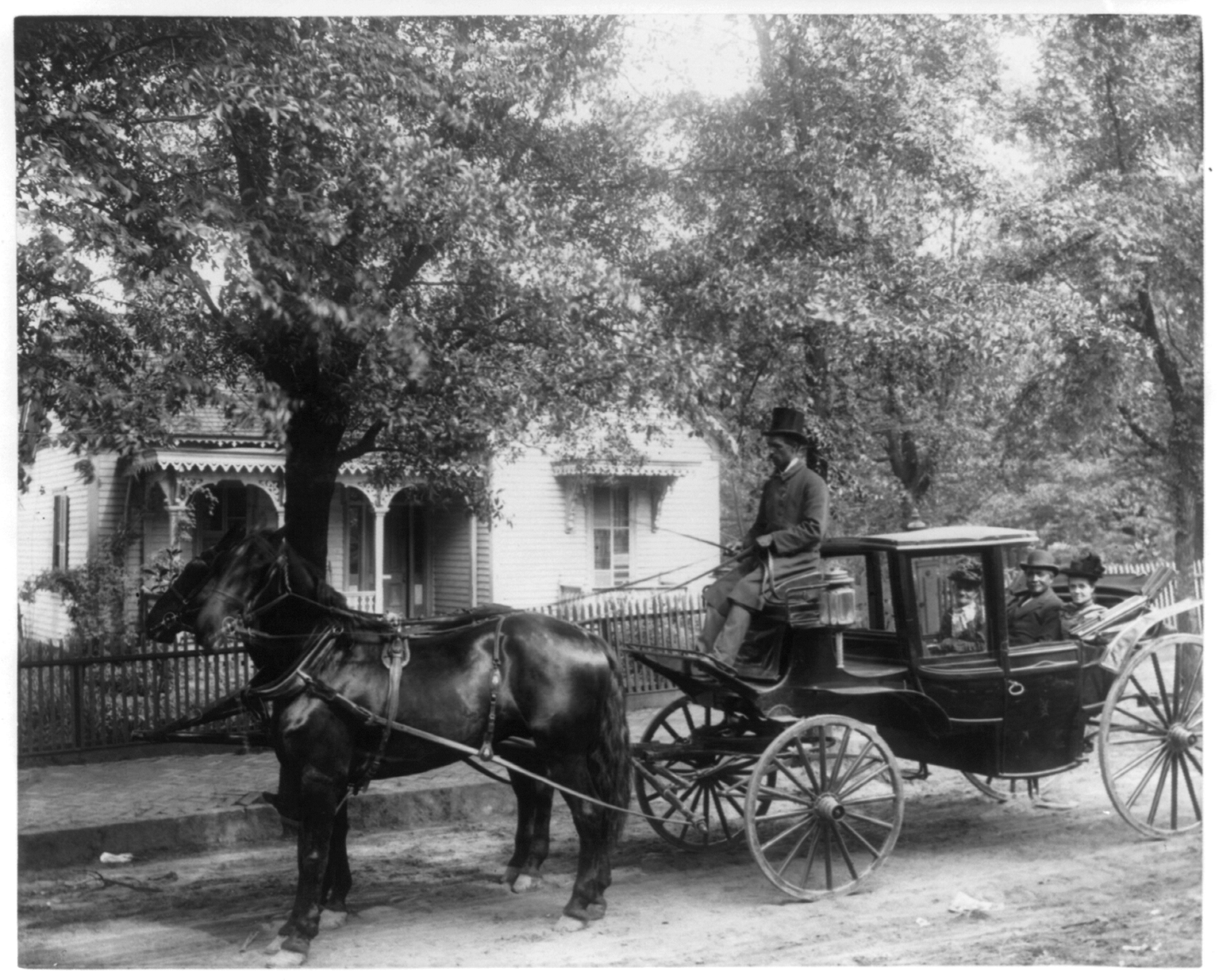
David Tobias Howard with his wife and mother, c. 1900

The school opened in 1923 as an Elementary School. It became a high school in 1948.

The school was named for David T. Howard, a former slave who owned Atlanta's largest black-owned undertaking business and founded its first African American owned bank. He was a noted philanthropist, particularly focused on educating children. He donated thousands of dollars to poor children to be educated, to Tuskegee University, and donated the 7.5-acre campus for the elementary school which was named after him.

Martin Luther King Jr. attended the school from 1936 until 1940.

The school building is brick. It closed in 1976.

In 2021, it reopened as David T. Howard Middle School.

== Athletics ==
The school competed in the Georgia Interscholastic Association. It won the 1954 state championship in basketball.

== Rebuilding ==
As of 2019, the former school is being rebuilt for a fall 2020 opening as a new middle school feeding into Midtown High School (Atlanta). The school will retain the Howard name, being called David T. Howard Middle School. The renovations will cost an estimated $52 million.

== Alumni ==
- Eldrin Bell, Atlanta police chief and Clayton County Commission chair.
- Clarence Cooper, judge
- Walt Frazier, professional basketball star
- Greg Harts, professional baseball player
- Maynard Jackson
- Vernon Jordan
- Lonnie C. King Jr., civil rights leader
- Martin Luther King Jr.
- Mildred McDaniel Singleton, Olympic gold medalist high jumper
- Charles Person, civil rights activist
- Herman J. Russell, a real estate entrepreneur and the first African American member of the Atlanta Chamber of Commerce

== Faculty ==
- Margaret Edson, sixth-grade social studies teacher and the 1999 winner of the Pulitzer Prize for Drama for the play Wit
