= Atlanta Student Movement =

Civil rights movement organization

The Atlanta Student Movement was formed in February 1960 in Atlanta, Georgia, by students from the campuses of the Atlanta University Center (AUC). It was led by the Committee on the Appeal for Human Rights (COAHR), and was part of the Civil Rights Movement.

== Background ==
On February 3, 1960, Atlanta University Center (AUC) senior Lonnie King read about the four young boys that had started the sit-in at the Woolworth Store in downtown Greensboro, North Carolina, on February 1. The participants of this first sit-in exhibited emotional fortitude and physical restraint, exposing a new generation of young adults to nonviolent direct activism.

The first thing that came to King's mind was panty raids and how quickly these raids could spread from one college to another. King believed that the panty-raid theory should be applied to the Civil Rights Movement because racial segregation was a problem that existed all over the US south, not just in Greensboro. King conferred with Joseph Pierce and Julian Bond about organizing a student movement in the Atlanta University Center. The three were dissatisfied with Atlanta's slow pace for change in segregation and decided to act.

AUC students mobilized to launch a series of demonstrations to end legalized segregation in public facilities on February 5, 1960. Approximately fifteen students attended the first meeting of prospective movement participants. The group attempted their first sit-in on Lincoln's birthday, but too few students were participating.

Word of the Atlanta Student Movement began to travel fast, and Lonnie King, Julian Bond, and others were summoned to appear before a special meeting of Atlanta University Center's Council of Presidents. The presidents spoke in turn, expressing their opinions on the proposed sit-in movement.

Dr. Clement, president of Atlanta University spoke first. He was followed by Dr. Mays of Morehouse, Dr. Manley of Spelman, and Dr. Brawley of Clark. The four presidents discouraged students from participating in the movement, instead focusing on their classwork. They believed in pursuing a legal strategy, letting the NAACP fight the racial battle. The fifth speaker was Dr. Harry V. Richardson of ITC. He stated, "I think that the kids are right. I have a Ph.D.; I head a major college, and I cannot go downtown except to spend my money." Dr. Frank Cunningham of Morris Brown College was the last to speak and he strongly supported Dr. Richardson's opinion about the student movement that was developing in the South.

Dr. Clement, chairman of the council, was caught off-guard by the latter comments, and asked who would speak on behalf of the students. Lonnie King was selected by his peers to speak and argued that it was time for the Negro community to come together and end segregation in Atlanta. Following King's speech, Dr. Clement suggested the students announce their position through a manifesto to the Atlanta Community before undertaking organized protests.

Lonnie King appointed Roslyn Pope, Morris Dillard, Albert Brinson, Julian Bond, and Charles Black to draft An Appeal for Human Rights, which described both their complaints as well as their desired goals for the proposed change. On March 9, 1960, An Appeal for Human Rights was published as a full-page ad in Atlanta Constitution, Atlanta Journal, and Atlanta Daily World. The original full-page ad was republished by the New York Times, Harvard Crimson, Nation magazine, and New York Senator Jacob Javits read it into the Congressional Record.

On March 16, 1960, the representatives from the six affiliated institutions of Atlanta University Center met to form the Committee on Appeal for Human Rights (COHAR). A unanimous decision was made that there should be three members from each affiliate institution on the committee. Lonnie King was elected chairman of the original committee, John Mack from Atlanta University was elected co-chairman, Benjamin Brown was elected Treasurer, and Mary Ann Smith was elected Secretary. The representatives of the respective institutions were: Atlanta University: John Mack, Johnny Parham, and Willie Mays; Clark: James Felder, Benjamin Brown and Lydia Tucker; Morehouse: Donald Clarke, Albert Brinson, and Julian Bond; Morris Brown: William Hickson, MaryAnn Smith, Robert Schley; ITC: Otis Moss, James Wilborn, Marion Bennett; Spelman: Marian Wright, Josephine Jackson, Roslyn Pope.

== Sit-ins, protests, and boycotts ==
On March 15, 1960, just six days after the publication of An Appeal for Human Rights, over two hundred Atlanta University Center students sat in at eleven restaurants in downtown Atlanta. Seventy-seven students were arrested for sitting-in, along with the six students who had signed An Appeal for Human Rights. The sit-ins were used to obtain a "test-case" for prosecution by NAACP lawyers.

In August 1960, Lonnie King asked Dr. Martin Luther King Jr. (no relation) to accompany the students in a voluntary arrest planned for October. The reason for this request was that the issue of Civil Rights was not a topic of discussion in the presidential election of 1960 between Richard Nixon and John F. Kennedy; both candidates were ignoring the more than 70,000 Negro college students in the South who were acting to defy segregation laws and demand freedom. However, the arrest of Dr. King would gain enough traction to put the sit-in movement on the agenda of the presidential campaign.

On October 19, 1960, hundreds of students, led by Lonnie King and the new COAHR co-chair, Herschelle Sullivan, and accompanied by Dr. King, staged sit-ins throughout Atlanta with a large number of arrests. The arrested students vowed: "Jail no bail." As a result of Dr. King's arrest, the protests increased in size the following day. Three days after the initial protest, at the request of Mayor William B. Hartsfield, who was attempting to arrange a settlement between the students and merchants, COAHR called for a pause in the protests. As a result of the truce, the students who had been arrested were released from jail.

Over the next four months, Lonnie King and the students continued to protest unabatedly. Protestors who were arrested would refuse bail, to crowd the jails. Downtown Atlanta white establishments lost over $10 million due to the Christmas Boycotts carried out by the Negro Community. With the Christmas Boycott success, Lonnie King announced an extension of the boycott to run through Easter on February 1, 1961.

On March 6, 1961, Jesse Hill requested Lonnie King and Sullivan, to attend an urgent meeting at the Chamber of Commerce. Power members of the white and black community were in attendance to call off the boycott on a gentleman's agreement to desegregate after the school system peacefully desegregates in the fall of 1961. The student leaders refused this agreement, as they wanted to keep fighting for equality. However, black leaders, including Martin Luther King Sr. and major NAACP leader, John Calhoun, insisted on the agreement, arguing that they had lived every day of their lives segregated and the white leaders were finally willing to sign an agreement to desegregate in three to four months' time. King and Sullivan felt betrayed by their elders in the black community but ultimately consented to the settlement.

In the wake of the settlement, students and members of the Negro community expressed their dissatisfaction with the community's elder black leadership decision to postpone desegregation. On March 10, 1961, a mass meeting was held at Warren Memorial with over 2000 people in attendance. Elder black leaders, including A.T. Walden, Martin Luther King Sr., and William Holmes Borders attempted to lecture the hostile audience about the thought process behind the decision that was made on March 6. The crowd began to turn into an angry mob and Lonnie King immediately called Dr. Martin Luther King Jr. to come to speak to the audience. Martin Luther King Jr. entered and would orate one of the greatest speeches he had ever given. Dr. King Jr. implored audience members to "resist the cancerous disease of disunity." He stated, "If anyone breaks this contract, let it be the white man."

== Achievements ==
The Atlanta Student Movement greatly impacted racial tensions not only in Atlanta but also across the nation. According to Bond, the sit-ins saw "Black property owners put up a bond which probably amounted to $100,000" to get sit-in demonstrators released from jail. The sit-ins also helped to engage American youth, bringing a younger generation of leaders to the fore and [generating] intense press coverage". In mainstream news, an ABC program showed Atlanta "as the city where, in the programs title, 'It Can Be Done', referring to the city's reputation for inter-racial cooperation".

Overall, the "disruption caused by sit-ins" organized by the Atlanta Student Movement "inspired the effort to desegregate peacefully", as well as aiding in creating "a political crisis for candidates during the presidential election campaign".

== Legacy ==
The original work on An Appeal for Human Rights started by members of the Atlanta Student Movement continues into the present, with periodic reviews in 2000 (the fortieth-anniversary An Appeal for Human Rights v.II) and 2010 (An Appeal for Human Rights vIII) by means of a review, reflection, and revision process by original members of COAHR.

Along with the lasting social effects that the Movement brought about, a more tangible legacy can be found near the West End of Atlanta, where Atlanta Student Movement Boulevard (formerly Fair Street) cuts through the campus of Clark Atlanta University. The street was named as such in a dedication ceremony on November 1, 2010, hosted by Kasim Reed, the Mayor of Atlanta.

=== New Appeal for Human Rights ===
On May 16, 2017, A New Appeal for Human Rights was released. Echoing the sentiments of the 1960s Appeal for Human Rights, the document highlights the importance of recognizing "human rights as universal and inalienable, as well as indivisible and interdependent".

Dr. Lonnie King, Chairman of the Atlanta Student Movement of 1960–1961, said that the document "clearly illustrates that the quest for a 'just' society continues to this day".
