= 3-2 engineering =

Type of engineering degree program

3-2 engineering programs, also called combined plans or dual degree programs, provide a unique opportunity for a liberal arts and engineering education. 3-2 students get a BA from their home institution, often a liberal arts college or university, and BS in engineering from a partner school. These programs are not to be confused with similar master's degree programs. At the end of five years, the student will have two bachelor's degrees, one from each school.

Often, 3-2 programs advertise that students get a more robust education. Traditional engineering majors cannot take as many classes in the humanities because they follow strict course sequences to graduate on time. 3-2 students get the technical training at the partner school as well as a myriad of quintessential liberal arts courses at their home institution.

== Home institution requirements ==
Students complete general education requirements for the home institution and STEM (science, technology, engineering, and mathematics) courses for transferring to the partner school. Since students are intended to stay for three years, they do not receive a degree from the home institution, usually a BA, until graduating from the partner school. Depending on the home institution, a student might receive a pre-engineering degree or a degree in the field of interest (i.e. a chemistry major for a chemical engineer or a physics major for a mechanical engineer).

Some partnerships allow students to complete a four-year degree at their home institution and then transfer to the partner school and get another degree. In this case, the student does not have to complete the engineering segment to get the home institution degree. Note that this not universally offered as a part of all 3-2 programs.

== Partner institution requirements ==
The partner school requires a student to take courses in calculus, physics, chemistry, and computer science before transferring. Some of the more established programs ensure admission given that the student fulfills grade, GPA, and course requirements. Other partner schools have students apply as transfer students. The partner recognizes STEM classes taken at the home institution as prerequisite for upper level engineering courses. After two years of engineering courses, the student receives both degrees.

== History ==
3-2 engineering programs have been around for quite some time. Case Institute of Technology, now Case Western Reserve University, established a program from 1903 to 1927 with Adelbert College. After a brief hiatus, widespread proliferation of 3-2 programs "... begun in the 1960s. Their major purpose has been to add a combined liberal arts/engineering dimension to higher education rather than to contribute to the central flow of undergraduate engineering manpower.".

== 3-2 programs as a means to promote minorities in engineering ==
Some 3-2 programs have promoted racial diversity in engineering by partnering with Historically Black Colleges and Universities (HBCUs). Georgia Tech, for example, has several partnerships with HBCUs. "In line with the initial goals of the program, the mission is to increase educational access for minorities in the engineering profession and attract talented young men and women to careers in math, science, and engineering through the Dual Degree Engineering Program".

Additionally, 3-2 programs minimize the, "... thousands of high school seniors [who] are overlooked by engineering programs because they didn't go to the "right" school, take the right courses, or do well on a standardized test". A bright but perhaps unmotivated high school student is not likely to enroll in an engineering program his or her first year if he/she does not have certain grades/test scores. 3-2 programs are structured so 1st, 2nd, and 3rd-year students can develop their calculus, physics and chemistry backgrounds in a more nurturing environment. At the Atlanta University Center, "Tutors are available for all pre-engineering courses offered at the member [home] institutions".

== 3-2 student success ==
Despite 3-2 program's lengthy history, there is little information on the success of 3-2 students. Depending on the source, one can find information dismissing, promoting, and being indifferent to 3-2 students. An article from the 1960s claims, "Several other officials state that the three-two students do as well as the regular students, or better". Whereas a more recent 1987 article states, "Such students represent an aberration in a liberal arts environment, and from the engineering side they have been more tolerated than encouraged". Both sources agree that there is a shortage of data on graduation rates and/or washout rates, GPA performance, and enrollment.

== Participating "partner" institutions ==
- Case Western Reserve University
- Columbia University
- Georgia Institute of Technology
- Rensselaer Polytechnic Institute
- Washington University in St. Louis
