= Ashview Heights =

Ashview Heights, Atlanta, Georgia
- CDP
- Interactive map of Ashview Heights, Atlanta, Georgia
- Coordinates: 33°45′00″N 84°25′20″W
- Country: United States
- State: Georgia
- County: Fulton

Population (2010)
  - Total: 1,292
- ZIP code(s): 30314 and 30310
- Area code: 404

Ashview Heights is a historic intown neighborhood located in southwest Atlanta, Georgia, United States. Established in the 1920s, it was one of the first planned African-American middle-class communities in Atlanta. The neighborhood is served by Booker T. Washington High School, which is Atlanta’s first African American high school and is listed on the National Register of Historic Places. The neighborhood is in close proximity to the Atlanta University Center.

== Transportation ==
Ashview Heights is located on the north side of Interstate 20 at the Langhorn Street exit. It is served by the Ashby MARTA station and MARTA buses.
