= Lonnie C. King Jr. =

American civil rights leader (1936–2019)

- Born: August 30, 1936; Arlington, Georgia, United States
- Died: March 5, 2019 (aged 82)
- Occupation: Civil rights leader

Lonnie C. King Jr. (August 30, 1936 – March 5, 2019) was an American civil rights leader. Beginning in 1960, he launched the Atlanta Student Movement, wrote the Appeal for Human Rights, and subsequently started the Committee on Appeal for Human Rights. His work led to the desegregation of Atlanta and continued advocacy has brought further education to America regarding present-day racism and the struggles of the civil rights movement.

== Background ==
Born on August 30, 1936, to Lonnie King and Bertha Thrasher in Arlington, Georgia, King spent most of his childhood in southern Georgia with his grandparents while his mother worked for $5 a day as a maid in Atlanta. He attended David T. Howard High School in Atlanta and became a very active member of Ebenezer Baptist Church. He attended Morehouse College where he met Julian Bond, Joseph Pierce, Roslyn Pope, and other young advocates ready to make their mark in the pivotal chapter of American history in which they were living. In cooperation with other Historically Black Colleges and Universities (HBCUs), they drafted the Appeal for Human Rights.

== An Appeal for Human Rights and the Committee on Appeal for Human Rights ==
The Appeal for Human Rights was a declaration contradicting the image Atlanta had presented the rest of the country; claiming it was tolerant and welcoming to all races. Highlighting this predicament, the writers stated, "We want to state clearly and unequivocally that we cannot tolerate, in a nation professing democracy and among people professing Christianity, the discriminatory conditions under which the Negro is living today in Atlanta, Georgia—supposedly one of the most progressive cities in the South". This powerful call to action stirred the city and less than a week later their voices took to the streets.

After the Greensboro Woolworth's lunch counter sit-in began in February 1960, King and his colleagues staged their own sit-ins across Atlanta in March. Upon writing their manifesto, they created the Committee on Appeal for Human Rights which organized the Atlanta Student Movement. The morning of March 15, 1960, about 200 students marched across the city and began the first wave of sit-ins. Predominantly these students attended Atlanta University, Clark College, Interdenominational Theological Center, Morehouse College, Morris Brown College, and Spelman College. This conglomeration of historically African American higher education institutions was known as the Atlanta University Center, and was committed to non-violent disobedience following Dr. Martin Luther King Jr.'s and Mahatma Gandhi's teachings and practices.

Protestors refusing to pay bail became commonplace in this environment, and King and his fellow marchers were normally no different. However, in this instance, King and Herschelle Sullivan (co-chairman of the Committee on Appeal for Human Rights) paid their $100 bail to be released to continue their activist work. These marches and sit-ins continued throughout the year and into the busy shopping season of 1960–1961, when segregated businesses in downtown Atlanta lost about 20 million dollars' worth of revenue due to the sit-ins and boycotts. On October 19, 1960, Dr. Martin Luther King Jr. came back to Atlanta and participated in the sit-ins; he was arrested and spent his first night in jail. "I had to practice what I preached."

Finally on March 6, 1961, an agreement was reached that desegregated over 300 restaurants in Atlanta and employers re-hired about 600 previously fired African American employees.

== Later life ==
Not long after, King had to drop out of Morehouse College due to finances; he joined the US Navy and served for three years as a dispersing clerk and prize fighter. Then using his G.I. Bill, he finished his degree at Morehouse, and then received his master's from the University of Baltimore in public education.

Later in life, King became the president of the Atlanta chapter of the National Association for the Advancement of Colored People (NAACP), and during his tenure advocated for the Atlanta School board to hire its first African American superintendent, Alonzo Crim. However, in 1971, King and other officers were removed from office due to differences about a controversial school desegregation plan.

In 2014, Atlanta Business-Atlanta Daily World inducted King into its Men of Influence Hall of Fame; he was unable to attend in person due to his wife passing away earlier that day.

King died on March 5, 2019, at the age of 82.
