= Charles Person =

African-American civil rights activist (1942–2025)

Charles Person (September 27, 1942 – January 8, 2025) was an African-American civil rights activist who was the youngest Freedom Rider of the 1961 Freedom Rides. He was born and raised in Atlanta, Georgia. Following his 1960 graduation from David Tobias Howard High School, he attended Morehouse College. Person was selected by the Congress of Racial Equality to join the Freedom Rides in 1961. His memoir Buses Are a Comin': Memoir of a Freedom Rider was published by St. Martin's Press in 2021. Charles most recently established the Freedom Riders Training Academy, a comprehensive curriculum on nonviolent resistance. The program, co-founded by Pete Conroy, of the Freedom Riders Park Board, was designed to educate individuals about the principles of peaceful demonstration and the lasting significance of First Amendment rights. Participants learn to exercise these rights responsibly and within the boundaries of the law, promoting constructive and lawful engagement. Person died from complications from leukemia on January 8, 2025, at the age of 82.

== Early life ==
Person was born in Atlanta on September 27, 1942. His father was an orderly at Emory University Hospital. He was a gifted math and physics student, with aspirations to become a scientist. In high school, he was a member of his local NAACP Youth Council. In the Fall of 1960, he enrolled as a freshman at Morehouse College. As a Freshman at Morehouse, he became active in the civil rights movement, joining a student organization called the Atlanta Committee on Appeal for Human Rights. Person received his first jail sentence, a sixteen-day trip, after a sit-in in 1961. In an interview, Person had this to say about the sit-ins: "Once I got involved, it was infectious, anything that had to do with protests, I was there. My life revolved around it, I did my homework and my assignment around sitting-in. You’d be surprised how good study habits you can develop, because you were just sitting at a lunch counter with no place to go, they weren’t going to feed us, so you just sat there and did your studies." They were attacked with items such as condiments and cigarette butts, and threatened with items like meat cleavers. The students in these sit-ins practiced non-violent tactics, which helped make the threats and attacks less interesting for the whites trying to intimidate them. He gained the attention of CORE recruiters that were looking for an Atlanta Freedom Rider. As a minor, he needed a parent signature to participate. His mother refused to sign (due to the fact that he did not inform his mother of the actions he was doing to fight for civil rights), but he was able to convince his father.

== Freedom Rides ==
Person was a member of the original 13 Freedom Riders departing from Washington, D.C. aboard a Trailways bus on May 4, 1961. His first encounter with the law came in Charlotte, North Carolina. At the Charlotte bus station, Person thought his shoes were dirty, so he decided to get a shoe shine. He decided to stay in the whites only shoe-shine station until either his shoes were shined or he was arrested. A policeman arrived shortly, and Person decided he would leave the chair to avoid arrest.

The most troubling encounter for Person occurred in Alabama. As the Trailways bus was leaving Atlanta it was boarded by a group of white Klansmen. As the bus departed, the Klansmen began making threats, such as "You niggers will be taken care of when you get in Alabama." After arriving in Anniston, Alabama hours after the Greyhound bus burning of another Freedom Ride bus, the Klansmen became violent. After the black riders refused to move to the back, one Klansman rushed Person, punching him in the face. Another Klansman struck Herman Harris, who was sitting next to Person. The Klansmen dragged a severely beaten Person and Harris to the back of the bus. The bus driver, who had left the bus some time during the fight, returned with a police officer. The officer did nothing to help the riders. The bus then continued on to Birmingham, Alabama.

In Birmingham, Person and fellow Freedom Rider James Peck were designated to test the segregationist policies at the station. Peck recalls "When we arrived in… Birmingham, we saw along the sidewalk about twenty men with pipes, we saw no cop in sight. And now I'll tell you what, how I remember the date. The next day, Bull Connor, the notorious police chief was asked why there were no police on hand. He said, he replied, it was Mother's Day and they were all visiting their mothers. Well, we got out of the bus and Charles Person, the black student from Atlanta and I, had been designated to try to enter the lunch counter. So of course we didn't there. This mob seized us and uh… well part of it seized me and the other seized Person, and I was unconscious, I'd say, within a minute." Person was attacked by a man with a lead pipe when Person and Peck attempted to use a whites only lunch counter. Person was able to escape and find his way to Fred Shuttlesworth's parsonage. He did not fight back. Person "chose nonviolence as a way of life."

== Freedom Riders Training Academy ==
In the aftermath of George Floyd's murder, Charles called Pete Conroy late in the evening. It was the only time Pete had seen him angry. Charles was watching the protests turn into riots. There was violence and vandalism. Charles said, "We've got to do something Those people don't know what the hell they're doing. They know nothing of MLK's nonviolent principles. They shouldn't be protesting after dark." He said, "We've got to teach people how to protest legally, effectively and peacefully." He hung up agitated. On February 1, 2025, the Freedom Riders Training Academy will launch at FRTAcademy.org with course curriculums rooted in the history of the Freedom Riders, CORE principles and other de-escalation strategies for students, law enforcement and arrested demonstrators entering an alternative sentencing program.

== City of Hoover's 80 Arrested Protestors ==
In 2024–25, the City of Hoover, Alabama, became the first in the nation to implement the Freedom Riders Training Academy (FRTAcademy) as a part of a deferred prosecution program. Nearly 80 demonstrators arrested during anti-police-violence protests were offered a groundbreaking alternative: rather than facing traditional punitive measures, they participated in a curriculum designed to teach peaceful protest and nonviolent resistance.

The idea for using FRTAcademy in Hoover came when Pete Conroy shared the concept with Charlie Waldrep, prosecutor for the City of Hoover, who recognized its potential to address the growing number of protest-related arrests. Instead of imposing fines or labor tasks, the FRTAcademy could equip demonstrators with the knowledge to express their rights lawfully, turning a challenging situation into an opportunity for growth. Susan Fuqua, Hoover's Court Director, quickly saw the value in educating first-time offenders rather than assigning punitive tasks that did not offer long-term benefits. She collaborated with Nick Durgess, Chief of Police for the City of Hoover, who approved the program, recognizing it as a constructive alternative that could strengthen community trust.

The demonstrators' defense was led by Richard Rice, a pro bono attorney who advocated for the FRTAcademy as a compassionate and productive solution. With his support, Brad Bishop, a Hoover judge, adopted the FRTAcademy as part of the court's pre-trial diversion program. Upon successful completion of the training, demonstrators had their records expunged, providing them with a fresh start.

The program was led by Jose Vega, a 25-year NYPD veteran and FBI Academy graduate. Under his instruction, the demonstrators learned about nonviolent resistance, constitutional rights, and the power of peaceful protest. This pioneering program not only reduced court caseloads and saved taxpayer dollars, but it also served as an effective justice reform tool, setting an example for communities nationwide.

== Sources ==
- Arsenault, Raymond (2006). Freedom Riders: 1961 and the Struggle for Racial Justice. New York, New York: Oxford University Press. pp. 103–175. ISBN 9780195136746.
- "Freedom Riders". The University of Mississippi. 2005. Archived from the original on April 2, 2011.
- "Eyes on the Prize Interview: Interview with James Peck". Blackside, Inc. October 26, 1979. Archived from the original on May 31, 2010.
- Branscome, Jeff (April 1, 2011). "Journalist, photographer reunite with activists". The Freelance Star. Fredericksburg, Virginia. Archived from the original on September 27, 2012.
- Person, Charles (2021), Buses Are A Comin'. New York, New York: St. Martin's Press. ISBN 9781250836762.
