= An Appeal for Human Rights =

1960 American civil rights document

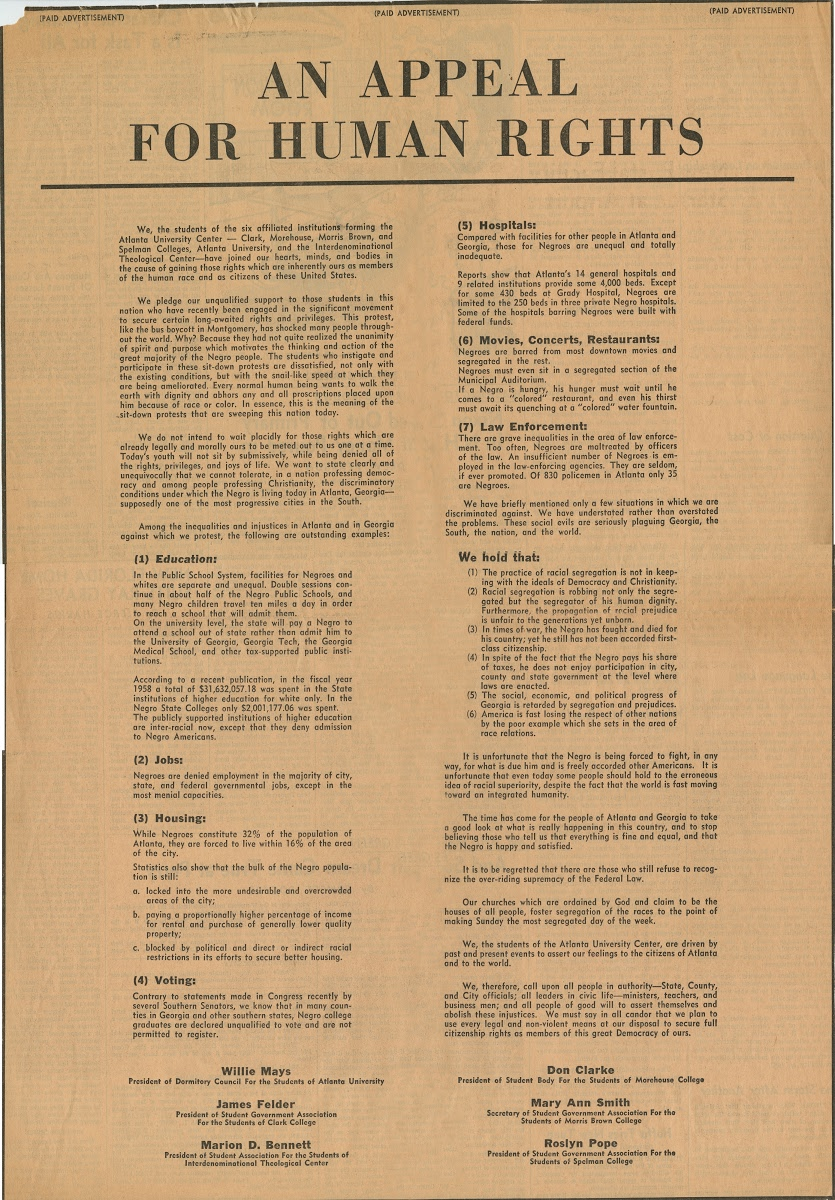
An Appeal for Human Rights (1960)

An Appeal for Human Rights is a civil rights manifesto initially printed as an advertisement in Atlanta newspapers on March 9, 1960, that called for ending racial inequality in Atlanta, Georgia, United States. The manifesto was written by students of Atlanta's six historically black colleges and universities that comprise the Atlanta University Center. It was drafted by Roslyn Pope and other students of the Atlanta University Center after the students, led by Lonnie King and Julian Bond, were encouraged by the six presidents of the Atlanta University Center to draft a document stating their goals. The students, organized as the Committee on Appeal for Human Rights (COAHR), published An Appeal for Human Rights working within and as part of the Civil Rights Movement.

== Writing ==
Inspired by the sit-in movement in other cities, students of the black colleges in Atlanta formed the Committee on Appeal for Human Rights, which led the Atlanta Student Movement. Atlanta University's president Rufus Clement suggested that they write a "bill of particulars" laying out their concerns and what they wanted to achieve. The document's primary author was Roslyn Pope, a 21-year-old student of Spelman College who wrote most of the first draft. It was printed on a typewriter at the home of Spelman College professor and historian Howard Zinn. The students took inspiration from a publication called A Second Look in Atlanta also called A Second Look, which was published in February 1960 and questioned the idea that Atlanta was more enlightened than other places in the South, such as Mississippi, in terms of racial equality.

An Appeal for Human Rights listed seven examples of areas of inequality within Atlanta: education; jobs; housing; voting; hospitals; movies, concerts, restaurants; and law enforcement. Each example had a short comment explaining the inequality in that area. The document was signed at the bottom by a student representative from each of the six schools comprising the Atlanta University Center: Willie Mays from Atlanta University, James Felder from Clark University, Marion D. Bennett from the Interdenominational Theological Center, Don Clarke from Morehouse College, Mary Ann Smith from Morris Brown College, and Roslyn Pope from Spelman College.

== Publication ==
An Appeal for Human Rights was printed as a full-page paid advertisement in The Atlanta Constitution on March 9, 1960. The ad was also published in The Atlanta Journal and Atlanta Daily World on the same day. The ad was purchased at a cost of $1,800. Atlanta University's president Rufus Clement told AJC Magazine in 1965 that he paid for it with a personal check which was later reimbursed though student fees, while Julian Bond said that the anti-segregationist Southern author and social critic Lillian Smith paid for the advertisement. In a March 10, 1960 article The Atlanta Constitution said that the check paying for the advertisement was signed by Clement using funds contributed by students.

After its publication, the advertisement was denounced by Georgia's segregationist governor Ernest Vandiver. The day after the advertisement was published, Vandiver read a prepared statement during a morning news conference which was also published in The Atlanta Constitution that same day. In the statement, Vandiver called An Appeal for Human Rights "anti-American" and "evil". Vandiver later said it "sounded as if it has been written in Moscow, if not in Peking," suggesting that it was Communist and anti-American propaganda.

A response from Atlanta mayor William B. Hartsfield was printed in the same March 10 issue of The Atlanta Constitution as Vandiver's response, who differed with the Governor's opinion and said that An Appeal for Human Rights represented "the legitimate aspirations of the city's own young people." Hartsfield also spoke positively of the students for their commitment to nonviolence.

The students sent a copy of the manifesto to Jacob Javits, a Republican senator that represented New York in the United States Senate. Javits approved of the message, and during a speech on the Senate floor on March 16, 1960, he requested that the manifesto be entered into the Congressional Record. In addition to being entered into the Congressional Record, the manifesto was republished for free in The New York Times and Los Angeles Times.

== Legacy ==
An historical marker was placed at Atlanta Student Movement Boulevard in Atlanta in 2014 by the Commission to Honor an Appeal for Human Rights and the Atlanta Student Movement, Atlanta City Council member Michael Julian Bond, and Atlanta mayor Kasim Reed. The historical marker describes the manifesto's origins and its impact.

The 60th anniversary of the publication of An Appeal for Human Rights was celebrated in a ceremony hosted by Atlanta City Council member Michael Julian Bond in March 2020. The Associated Press interviewed Roslyn Pope for a story published on March 9, 2020, the 60th anniversary of the manifesto's publication, who expressed concern that the achievements the students worked hard for were being eroded, and said “we have to be careful. It's not as if we can rest and think that all is well.
