= Herschelle Sullivan Challenor =

- Known for: key activist in the Atlanta Student Movement

Academic background
- Education: Spelman College; Johns Hopkins University; Columbia University

Academic work
- Discipline: international affairs

Herchelle Sullivan Challenor (born 1938) is a foreign policy expert, international civil servant, university administrator, and was one of the key activists in the Atlanta Student Movement, part of the Civil Rights Movement, of the early 1960s.

== Early life and family ==
Challenor is the second child of Atlanta natives. Her mother and aunts graduated from Spelman College and her father was a Morehouse College graduate. While Challenor was born in Atlanta in 1938, the Sullivan family moved to Pittsburgh when her father enrolled in graduate school at Carnegie Institute of Technology. She was a preschooler when they moved. Her father became an electrical engineer and then a college professor. In Pittsburgh her mother also earned her Master's in Social Work. They remained in Pittsburgh throughout her childhood. When they graduated from high school, she and her sister were each offered scholarships from colleges in the north, but both chose to follow in their mother's footsteps to enroll at Spelman College back in Atlanta, Georgia.

== Academic life ==
Challenor was an active member of the Spelman community. She was elected Freshman class president. In 1958 she wrote an article for The Spelman Spotlight, the school paper, entitled "Cowering Experience", criticizing the traditional rules and lifestyle enforced by the administration upon the students. The school's president, Dr. Albert E. Manley, reprimanded Challenor for the article, and it became a black mark on her record. Nonetheless, Challenor later earned the Merrill Scholarship, which funded a year of study abroad. She went to France and studied at the Sorbonne and the University of Grenoble, where she spent time with African students, many of whom came from countries that were colonized by France. Her experiences in France informed much of her later career. Traveling abroad meant that Challenor graduated a year late from Spelman, but while she was still overseas she was elected Spelman student body president for her final year.

Challenor received her Bachelor of Arts from Spelman College in 1961 (though she is often still listed with her original graduating class of 1960). In March 1961, Challenor was among students awarded a scholarship for a summer start to graduate school because the Southern Education Foundation and the Woodrow Wilson National Fellowship Foundation partnered to encourage students of African-American descent who graduated from Southern colleges to stay in the South to teach. Challenor found the students in Kentucky politically apathetic for her tastes, and instead went on to receive a Master of Arts from Johns Hopkins University's School of Advanced International Studies in 1963, where she was their first African-American woman to earn a degree. She then went on to earn her Ph.D. from Columbia University in Political Science: International Relations and African Affairs in 1970. While a doctoral candidate at Columbia she lived in Benin from 1967 to 1968, doing research for her thesis: French Speaking West Africa's Dahomeyan Strangers in Colonization and Decolonization.

== Atlanta Student Movement ==
While many sources credit Challenor with co-signing the March 9, 1960, Appeal for Human Rights, the students' manifesto published in local newspapers, Challenor was actually still studying in Paris at the time. Upon her return to Atlanta in September 1960, however, Challenor did become co-chair of the students' organization, the Committee on Appeal for Human Rights (COAHR). She replaced the founding Co-Chair, John Mack of Clark Atlanta University, who had graduated the previous spring. Her co-leader was Lonnie King.

Early in her tenure as co-chair, Challenor helped arrange for Dr. Martin Luther King, Jr., to join the students in simultaneous, peaceful COAHR-organized sit-ins at lunch counters around Atlanta. On October 19, 1960, with students protesting at several different lunch counters around the city, both Challenor and Dr. King protested at Rich's Department Store, the largest store in Atlanta and thus the local leader in business people's decisions with regard to segregation. They were both arrested there, along with many other students. Dr. King became Challenor's mentor and remained so until his assassination in 1968, even writing her a letter of recommendation for graduate school.

Challenor quickly became the student spokesperson for the Student-Adult Liaison Committee, a group formed over the summer of 1960 to show a unified African-American front in the fight for desegregation in Atlanta. Challenor would attend various adult-only functions, such as church fundraisers to support jailed students, as the students' representative. For example, when the Student-Adult Liaison Committee decided to work together to extend the boycott of lunch counters to all downtown Atlanta businesses, Challenor called a press conference with Reverend William Holmes Borders announcing the broader initiative.

Tuesday, February 7, 1961, saw Challenor's second arrest, during a sit-in in Sprayberry's cafeteria, located in a building that also housed federal offices. Most of the students chose to follow the "Jail-no-bail" campaign, while she and Lonnie King posted bail to keep fighting on the students' behalf in the community.

April, 1961, Challenor, Benjamin Brown, Charles Lyles, and Lonnie King filed a federal lawsuit against "public" facilities owned by the city. They did so without a lawyer, submitting the suit on the seventh anniversary of Brown v. Board of Education. The filing was a class action on behalf of all African-American residents of Atlanta. On August 27, 1962, the courts ruled in their favor. By this time, Challenor was already studying at Johns Hopkins University and was no longer an active member of the Atlanta Student Movement.

In 2010, the Jimmy Carter Presidential Library & Museum honored Challenor along with thirty-four other women who fought for civil rights in Atlanta. Challenor was a member of the speakers' panel at the event.

== Career ==
While working on her doctorate, in 1966, Challenor did work as an "interpreter escort" for women visiting from African locations for the Women's African Committee of the Africa-American Institute. From 1969 to 1972, she served as an assistant professor at the City University of New York, Brooklyn College Department of Political Science during which time she was also a Fellow at Adlai Stevenson Institute of International Affairs in Chicago (1970-1971).

In 1972, Dr. Challenor's work shifted to Washington, D.C. She served as an American Political Science Studies Association Congressional Fellow, working for Congressman Charles Diggs, Jr of Michigan. The same year, presidential nominee Senator George McGovern selected a panel of foreign policy advisors, including Challenor.

The following year (1973), Challenor went to work for the Ford Foundation, as its Program Officer for Diversity Education and Research, where she stayed for two years. Her next post, as the Staff Director for Committee on International Relations at US House of Representatives, lasted from 1975-1978. From there she moved to United Nations' Educational, Scientific and Cultural Organization (UNESCO) in 1978, as the Senior Liaison Officer in the Washington, D.C. Communications Liaison Office, and in 1983 she became UNESCO's Director of Washington office. She next served as Coordinator of the World Decade for Cultural Development (1988-1997) for several years at UNESCO Headquarters in Paris, France.

Clark Atlanta University established its School of International Relations in 1993, and Dr. Challenor accepted the role of dean of the school. While there, she helped use a $3 million grant from the W.K. Kellogg Foundation to "internationalize" the school. During her tenure at CAU, President Bill Clinton appointed Challenor to the National Security Education Board (NSEB) of the National Security Education Program, where she helps determine the skills national security employees should possess. She served two terms, starting in 1994 and 1999. In 2002, Dr. Challenor switched positions at CAU to become the Professor of International Relations & African Affairs, Department of International Affairs and Development.

Dr. Challenor's final professional positions were with United States Agency for International Development (USAID). She was originally hired as administrator Constance Berry Newman's Special Assistant. From 2004 to 2006, Challenor served as Director of Democracy and Governance Programs at the USAID Mission in Conakry, Guinea.

== Publications ==
- "No Longer at Ease: Confrontation at the 12th Annual African Studies Association Meeting at Montreal" Africa Today 16, nos. 5–6, pages 4–7. 1969.
- "A Challenge to Multilateralism", Africa Report, September Political Science Quarterly 87, number 3 (1972): pages 493–496. doi:10.2307/2149236.
- "United States Foreign Policy Towards Africa". Johnson, Willard R., Goler Butcher, Herschelle Challenor, Karl Gregory, Elizabeth Landis, John Marcum, Ronald Walters, Peter Weiss, and Carol A. Bloomberg. Africa Today 20, number 1 (1973): pages 15–44.
- "The Sahel Drought: A Continuing Disaster", RAINS Information Sheet, November 1, 1973
- "Trans-Africanism: Towards an African Peoples Alliance". Pages 17–42 in Proceedings of the Conference on Afro-Americans and Africans: Historical and Political Linkages. Washington, D.C.: Howard University, 1974.
- Strangers in African Societies, edited by William A. Shack, Elliott Percival Skinner, and Herschelle Challenor. Berkeley, California: University of California Press, 1979.
- "The Influence of Black Americans on U.S. Foreign Policy Toward Africa". Pages 139–74 in Ethnicity and US. Foreign Policy, edited by A. A. Said. New York: Praeger Publishers, 1977.
- "The Contribution of Ralph Bunche to Trusteeship and Decolonization", in Ralph Bunche, The Man and His Times edited by Benjamin Rivlin. New York: Holmes & Meier, 1990.
- "Transition: January 1999, Cambridge". Foreign Policy, number 114 (1999): pages 135–137. doi:10.2307/1149602.
- "African Studies at Historically Black Colleges and Universities". African Issues 30, number 2 (2002): pages 24–29.
