= JULIAN =

American civil rights organization

- Named after: Julian Bond
- Established: 2020
- Founder: Jill Collen Jefferson
- Type: Nonprofit
- Website: www.julianfreedom.org

JULIAN is a nonprofit organization founded by civil rights attorney Jill Collen Jefferson. JULIAN conducts investigations into suspected civil rights violations, provides free legal services, and advocates for policy and government action.

In 2021, an $11.3 million wrongful death judgement was awarded in a case investigated by JULIAN, and in 2022, JULIAN filed a civil rights lawsuit against the city of Lexington, Mississippi.

== Background ==
JULIAN was founded by Jill Collen Jefferson as a civil rights organization in 2020. Jefferson is an attorney from Jones County, Mississippi who graduated from Harvard Law School, and named the organization after her mentor Julian Bond.

In 2017, Jefferson began research into suspected lynchings of Black people in the United States and then focused on Mississippi in 2019. To help support the organization, Jefferson received a grant from Jrue and Lauren Holiday through their JLH Social Impact Fund.

== 2020–2021 ==
As a pro bono case, Jefferson investigated the hanging death of Willie Andrew Jones Jr. in Scott County, Mississippi. In December 2020, The Bellinder Law Firm and JULIAN filed a wrongful death lawsuit on behalf of his survivors, which resulted in a 2021 judgment for more than $11.3 million. Jefferson and JULIAN then focused on advocacy for criminal charges.

Some of JULIAN's other cases include investigations into the deaths of Raynard Johnson, Nick Naylor, Roy Veal, Frederick Jermaine Carter, Otis Byrd, and Deondrey Montreal Hopkins, who were all found hanging from trees in Mississippi between 2000 and 2019.

== 2022–2026 ==
A former police officer gave JULIAN a recording of then-Lexington police chief Sam Dobbins boasting about killing Black people, which led to Dobbins being fired in July 2022, soon after JULIAN released the recording to the media.

In August 2022, JULIAN filed a civil rights lawsuit on behalf of five Black men against Dobbins and the city of Lexington, Mississippi in the U.S. District Court for the Southern District of Mississippi. The lawsuit includes allegations of false arrests, excessive force, and unreasonable searches and seizures, as well as racial profiling and retaliation against Black residents, and seeks a temporary restraining order against the police department on behalf of Lexington residents.

JULIAN has also advocated for a federal investigation of the city government of Lexington and its police department, and policy changes related to the city government system for citizen complaints against police officers.

In 2026, JULIAN released a report, "A Crimson Record: Seven State Modern-Day Lynching Report 2000–2025", which questioned whether hate crimes against trans women were being misclassified as suicides.
