= Walton Spring =

Resort in Atlanta, Georgia

Coordinates: 33°45′30″N 84°23′32″W

Walton Spring was a noted resort in early Atlanta, Georgia. It was located in Downtown Atlanta along the northeast side of Walton from the northwest corner of Spring Street (now Ted Turner Drive), running almost up to Cain Street (now Andrew Young International Blvd.). Spring Street was named after the spring, and Walton Street was named after the property owner, a member of Atlanta's first city council, Anderson W. Walton.
