= Oswald Houston =

American pioneer (1798–1861)

Oswald Houston (April 16, 1798 – June 11, 1861) was a merchant as well as the first treasurer of the city of Atlanta, Georgia, USA, serving the city from just after its inception in 1847 to the mid-1850s when he was disabled by a stroke.

== Early life ==
Houston was born in Abbeville District, South Carolina, on April 16, 1798. On May 20, 1818, he received an appointment to attend West Point Military Academy, following his December 15, 1817, letter to the War Department. However, it is uncertain that he actually attended the Academy. He served as a Captain of Artillery in South Carolina. He married Sarah Saxon in 1819 and, after her death, he married Anna Eliza Shaw in 1821.

== Career ==
In 1833, Houston and his family moved to Williamsport, Maury County, Tennessee. Here he farmed and was a member of the church. He and his wife raised their family, losing several children to infectious diseases. For a brief period, he moved to Paducah, but returned to Williamsport. In 1847, injured when his wagon overturned, he determined that he would have to seek alternative means of earning a living.

== Atlanta's first treasurer ==
In May 1847, the year that the city changed its name from Marthasville to Atlanta, he moved his family to this burgeoning railroad terminus where he engaged in merchandising and was the first city treasurer. He was re-elected for several additional terms as treasurer until he was stricken with paralysis in 1855 after which he was an invalid until his death.

== Commemoration and memorials ==
In noting his death, it was said, "...on June 11, 1861, of Oswald Houston, Atlanta lost the good citizen who kept watch over its finances in its formative years as a city, through long service as city treasurer." In June 1847, Houston was a co-founder of Atlanta's first Sunday school, an ecumenical school for all religions. In January 1848, he was a co-founder of the Presbyterian Church which ultimately became the First Presbyterian Church in Atlanta. He is buried at Oakland Cemetery in Atlanta.

Houston Street in Atlanta, now renamed John Wesley Dobbs Avenue, was named for him. However, Houston County in central Georgia is said to have been named after John Houstoun who was governor of Georgia for several terms in the 18th century, Houston County, Georgia, and after whom some would erroneously claim John Houstoun the original name of Houston Street in Atlanta which was originally named after Oswald Houston.

== Clarification on pronunciation ==
The pronunciation of his last name causes some friendly, and at times not-so-friendly, contention between natives of Georgia and Texas. He pronounced his last name "HOUSE-tun" and the (former) street name was also pronounced that way as is Houston Mill Road in Decatur, Georgia, named after the mill that was built by his son Washington Jackson Houston. Almost everyone who is not from Georgia will pronounce it in the way of the city in Texas, "HYOOS-tun", and will be quickly corrected by native Georgians.

== Disambiguation ==
With the surname pronounced differently but spelled the same, Oswald has sometimes been said to be a relative of Sam Houston whose ancestry evolved in the same region but there is no documented linkage at this time.

There is a Benjamin Houston who married Elizabeth "Betsy" Oswald. Descendants are working on confirming whether Oswald Houston was a son of this couple.
