= Julian Bond =

American politician and activist (1940–2015)

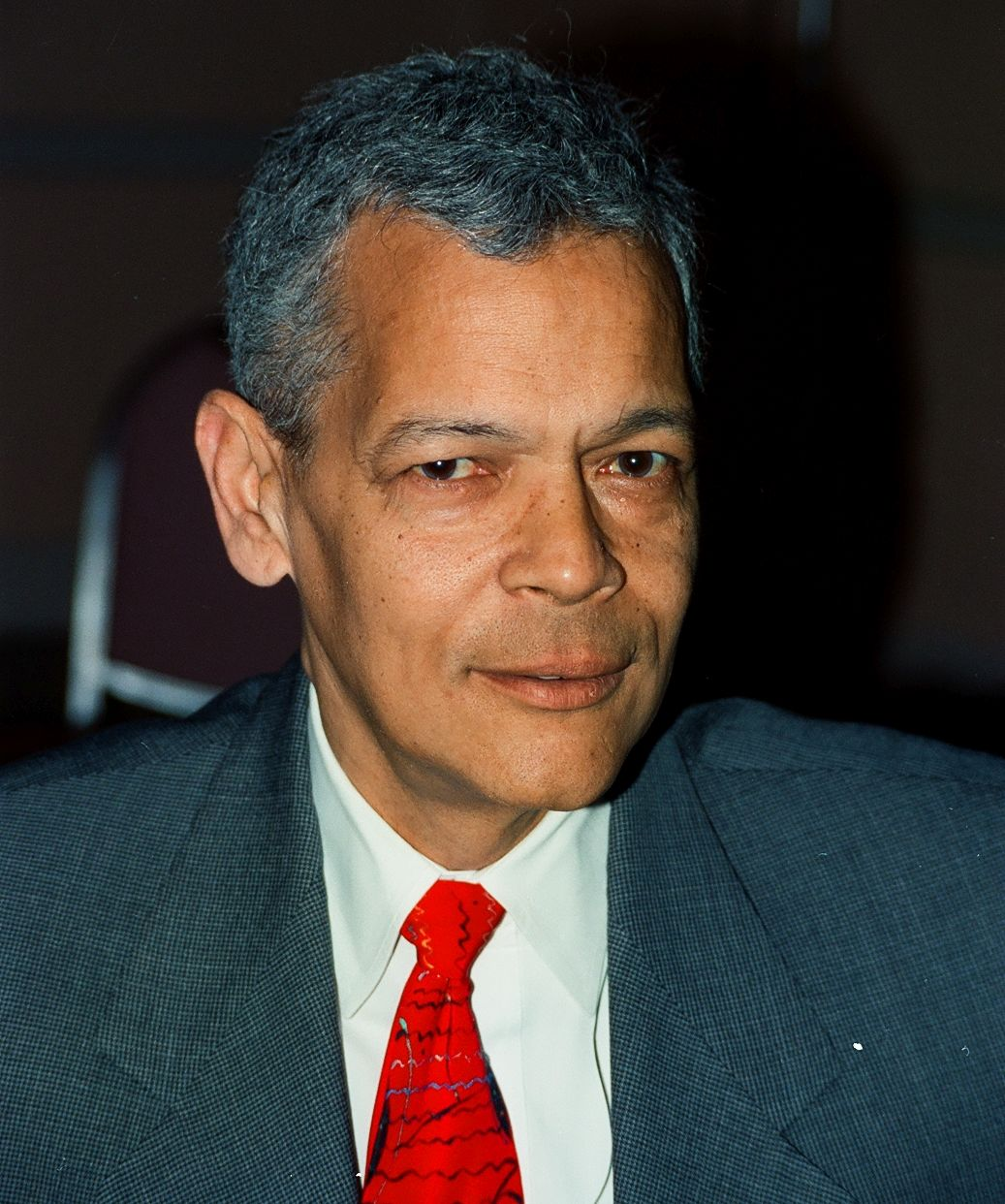
- Bond in 2000

Chair of the National Association for the Advancement of Colored People
- In office 1998–2010
- Preceded by: Myrlie Evers-Williams
- Succeeded by: Roslyn Brock

Member of the Georgia State Senate from the 39th district
- In office January 13, 1975 – January 12, 1987
- Preceded by: Horace Ward
- Succeeded by: Hildred Shumake

Member of the Georgia House of Representatives
- In office January 9, 1967 – January 13, 1975
- Succeeded by: Mildred Glover
- Constituency: 136th district (1967–1969); 111th district (1969–1973); 32nd district (1973–1975)

Personal details
- Born: Horace Julian Bond; January 14, 1940 Nashville, Tennessee, U.S.
- Died: August 15, 2015 (aged 75) Fort Walton Beach, Florida, U.S.
- Party: Democratic
- Other political affiliations: Democratic Socialists of America
- Spouse(s): Alice Clopton (m. 1961; div. 1989) Pamela Horowitz (m. 1990)
- Children: 5
- Education: Morehouse College (BA)

Horace Julian Bond (January 14, 1940 – August 15, 2015) was an American social activist, leader of the civil rights movement, politician, professor, and writer.

As a student at Morehouse College in Atlanta, Georgia, during the early 1960s, he helped establish the Student Nonviolent Coordinating Committee (SNCC). In 1971, he co-founded the Southern Poverty Law Center in Montgomery, Alabama, and served as its first president for nearly a decade.

Bond was elected to four terms in the Georgia House of Representatives and later to six terms in the Georgia State Senate, serving a total of twenty years in both legislative chambers.

Following his career in the legislature, he was a professor of history at the University of Virginia from 1990 to 2012. From 1998 to 2010, he was chairman of the National Association for the Advancement of Colored People (NAACP).

== Early life and education ==
Bond was born in 1940 at Hubbard Hospital in Nashville, Tennessee, to parents Julia Agnes (Washington) and Horace Mann Bond. His father was an educator, then president of Fort Valley State College. His mother, Julia, was a former librarian at Clark Atlanta University, also a historically black college.

The family resided on campus at Fort Valley State College. The house of the Bonds was a frequent stop for scholars, activists, and celebrities passing through, such as W. E. B. Du Bois and Paul Robeson.

In 1945, Bond's father accepted the position of president of Lincoln University, where he was its first African-American president, and the family moved north.

In 1957, Bond graduated from George School, a private Quaker preparatory boarding school near Newtown in Bucks County, Pennsylvania. He attended Morehouse College, a historically black college in Atlanta, Georgia. He was very involved at Morehouse. He was a swimmer on the varsity squad. He worked as an intern at Time magazine and was one of the founding members of The Pegasus, a literary magazine.

== Student Nonviolent Coordinating Committee ==
On April 17, 1960, Bond helped co-found the Student Nonviolent Coordinating Committee (SNCC).

In 1961, Bond left Morehouse to join the staff of the Atlanta Inquirer, a new black protest paper he had helped establish in the summer of 1960 with Jesse Hill, Herman J. Russell, and various other students in the Atlanta Student Movement including Charlayne Hunter-Gault, and Lonnie King.

Following the white violence visited in the summer of 1961 on the first voter registration efforts (under the direction of Bob Moses) in McComb, Mississippi, including the murder of activist Herbert Lee, Bond took the new full-time position of communications director for SNCC assisted by Casey Hayden, Mary King and Dottie Miller, until September 1966. During this period, he travelled frequently to Mississippi (active in the Freedom Summer registration drive in 1964) and to Georgia, Alabama, and Arkansas.

By the mid-1960s, and without embracing a black separatist agenda, Bond had concluded that the continued presence of white organizers in SNCC was undermining black self-confidence. He later reflected:

"The successes Freedom Summer achieved resulted from its embrace of a paradox — it tried to fight bigotry by appealing to people more concerned about whites, not blacks. Appealing to the nation's racism accepted white supremacy. By acknowledging its dependence on whites to popularize the civil rights struggle in the South, SNCC contradicted its rhetorical belief in the equal worth of all races, and undermined its insistence that indigenous blacks were best prepared to lead the struggle for their deliverance from white dominance."

At age 31, with SNCC shedding staff and volunteers after its abortive merger with Black Panther Party, Bond returned to Morehouse College in 1971, to complete his Bachelor of Arts in English.

== Georgia General Assembly ==
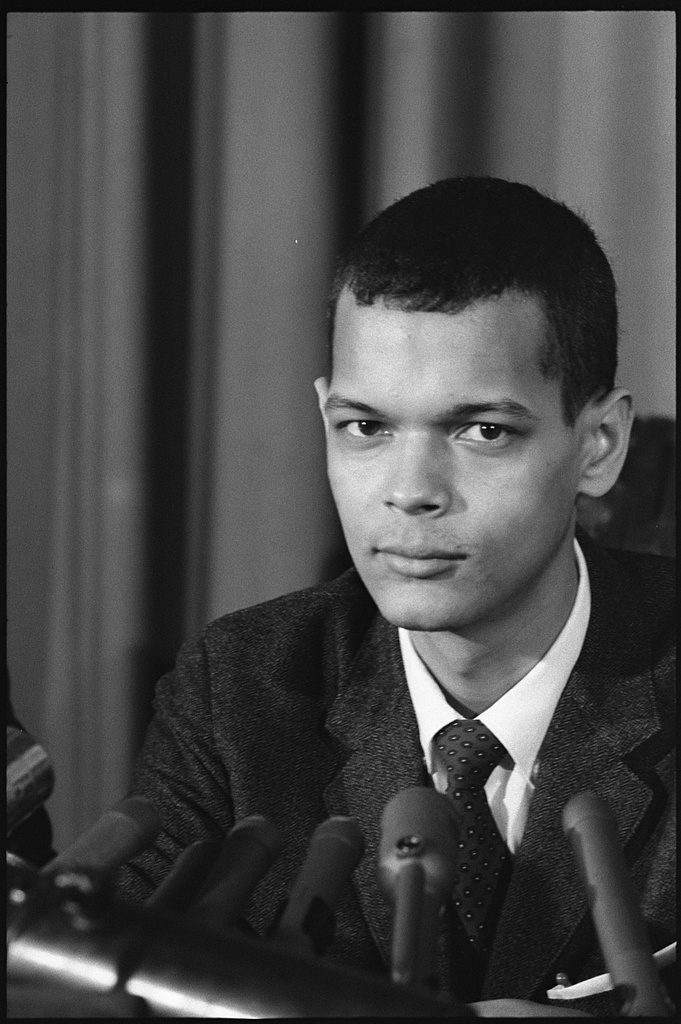
Bond in 1966

In addition to his organizing with SNCC, Bond ran for political office in Georgia. In 1965, he was one of 11 African Americans elected to the Georgia House of Representatives. They were aided by the expansion of the franchise for blacks in the state, who largely supported Democratic Party candidates, after national passage of the Civil Rights Act of 1964 and Voting Rights Act of 1965. The latter especially had brought federal oversight to enforce the constitutional rights of blacks to vote. As states ended discriminatory practices in voter registration, African Americans regained the ability to vote and entered the political process.

Although initially undecided about his party affiliation, Bond ultimately ran and was elected as a Democrat, the party of President Lyndon B. Johnson, who had supported civil rights, and signed the Civil Rights Act and Voting Rights Act into law. On January 10, 1966, Georgia representatives voted 184–12 not to seat Bond after the election, because he had publicly endorsed SNCC's policy of opposition to United States involvement in the Vietnam War. Five of the representatives who did vote to seat Bond were white, including Republican Rodney Cook. They disliked his stated sympathy for persons who were "unwilling to respond to a military draft".

Bond took the legislature to court. A three-judge panel of the United States District Court for the Northern District of Georgia ruled in a 2–1 decision that the Georgia House had not violated any of Bond's constitutional rights. The case reached the Supreme Court of the United States in 1966, which ruled 9–0 in the case of Bond v. Floyd (385 U.S. 116) that the Georgia House of Representatives had denied Bond his freedom of speech and was required to seat him. From 1967 to 1975, Bond was elected to four terms in the Georgia House, where he organized the Georgia Legislative Black Caucus.

In January 1967, Bond was among eleven Georgia House members who refused to vote when the legislature elected segregationist Democrat Lester Maddox of Atlanta as governor of Georgia over the Republican Bo Callaway. Callaway had led in the 1966 general election by some three thousand votes. Under the Georgia Constitution of 1824, the state legislature had to settle the election because neither major party candidate had polled a majority in the general election. Former Governor Ellis Arnall polled more than fifty thousand votes as a write-in candidate, a factor which led to the impasse. Bond would not support either Maddox or Callaway, although he was ordered to vote by lame duck Lieutenant Governor Peter Zack Geer.

Throughout his House career, Bond had to deal with repeated redistricting of his district by the state legislature:

- 1967–1969: 136th
- 1969–1973: 111th
- 1973–1974: 32nd

Bond was elected in 1974 for the first of six terms in the Georgia Senate, where he served from 1975 to 1987. He was a member of the Democratic Socialist Organizing Committee and its successor, the Democratic Socialists of America.

During the 1968 presidential election, Bond led an alternate delegation from Georgia to the Democratic National Convention in Chicago. There he was the first African American to have his name entered into nomination as a major-party candidate for Vice President of the United States. The 28-year-old Bond quickly declined, citing the constitutional requirement that one must be at least 35 years of age to serve in that office.

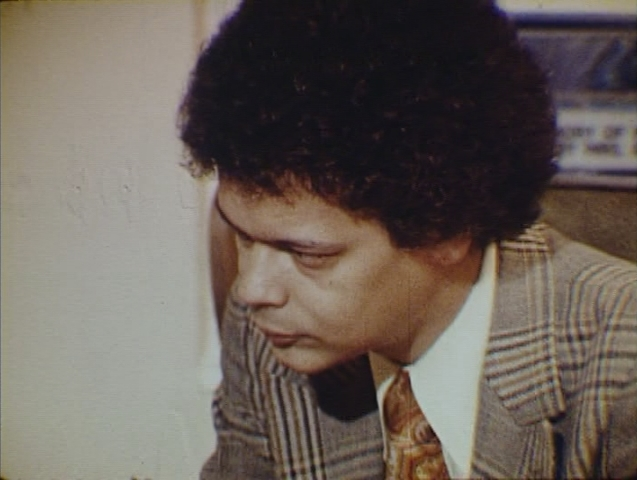
Bond being interviewed by WFSU-TV in 1978

=== 1986 Congressional campaign ===
Bond ran for the United States House of Representatives from Georgia's 5th congressional district (encompassing Atlanta) in 1986. He lost the Democratic nomination in a primary runoff to rival civil rights leader John Lewis in a major upset. In the initial round, Lewis had finished in second with 35%, while Bond ranked first with 47%. In the run-off, Lewis defeated him 52% to 48%. During the campaign, Bond had been accused of using cocaine and other drugs. Lewis challenged Bond to take a drug test; Lewis had said he took one and passed. Bond refused, saying the drug test was akin to McCarthyism and trivialized the issue of drugs.

1986 Georgia's 5th Congressional District Democratic Primary Runoff Election results by precinct Lewis: 50–60%; 60–70%; 70–80%; 80–90%; 90-100%; Bond: 50–60%; 60–70%; 70–80%; 80–90%; 90-100%; No Vote

While Bond had raised twice as much money as Lewis and had a larger national reputation, Lewis cast himself as the man on the front lines of the Civil Rights Movement and ran up large margins over Bond among white voters in Atlanta (a minority in the district). As the district had a very large Democratic majority, winning the Democratic primary meant that Lewis was almost certain to win the general election. After he did so, he served in Congress for 30 years until his death on July 17, 2020.

Still dogged by allegations of drug use, Bond resigned from the Georgia Senate the following year. Bond's estranged wife, Alice, who had publicly accused him of using cocaine, later retracted her statements.

After leaving politics, Bond taught at several universities in major cities in the North and South, including American University, Drexel, and Harvard.

Bond taught the history of the civil rights movement at the University of Virginia from 1990 to 2012. While there he shared his experiences of the movement with thousands of students through stories, newsreels, music, and film. Bond was on the Board of Selectors of Jefferson Awards for Public Service.

== Later civil-rights activism ==
With Morris Dees, in 1971 Bond helped found the Southern Poverty Law Center (SPLC), a public-interest law firm based in Montgomery, Alabama. He served as its president until 1979, and was an emeritus member of its board of directors at the time of his death in 2015. Bond also advocated for Africans in Europe.

In 1998, Bond was selected as chairman of the NAACP. Bond once referred to leading the NAACP as "the most powerful job a Black man can have in America." In November 2008, he announced that he would not seek another term as chairman. Bond agreed to stay on in the position through 2009, as the organization celebrated its 100th anniversary. Roslyn Brock was chosen as Bond's successor on February 20, 2010.

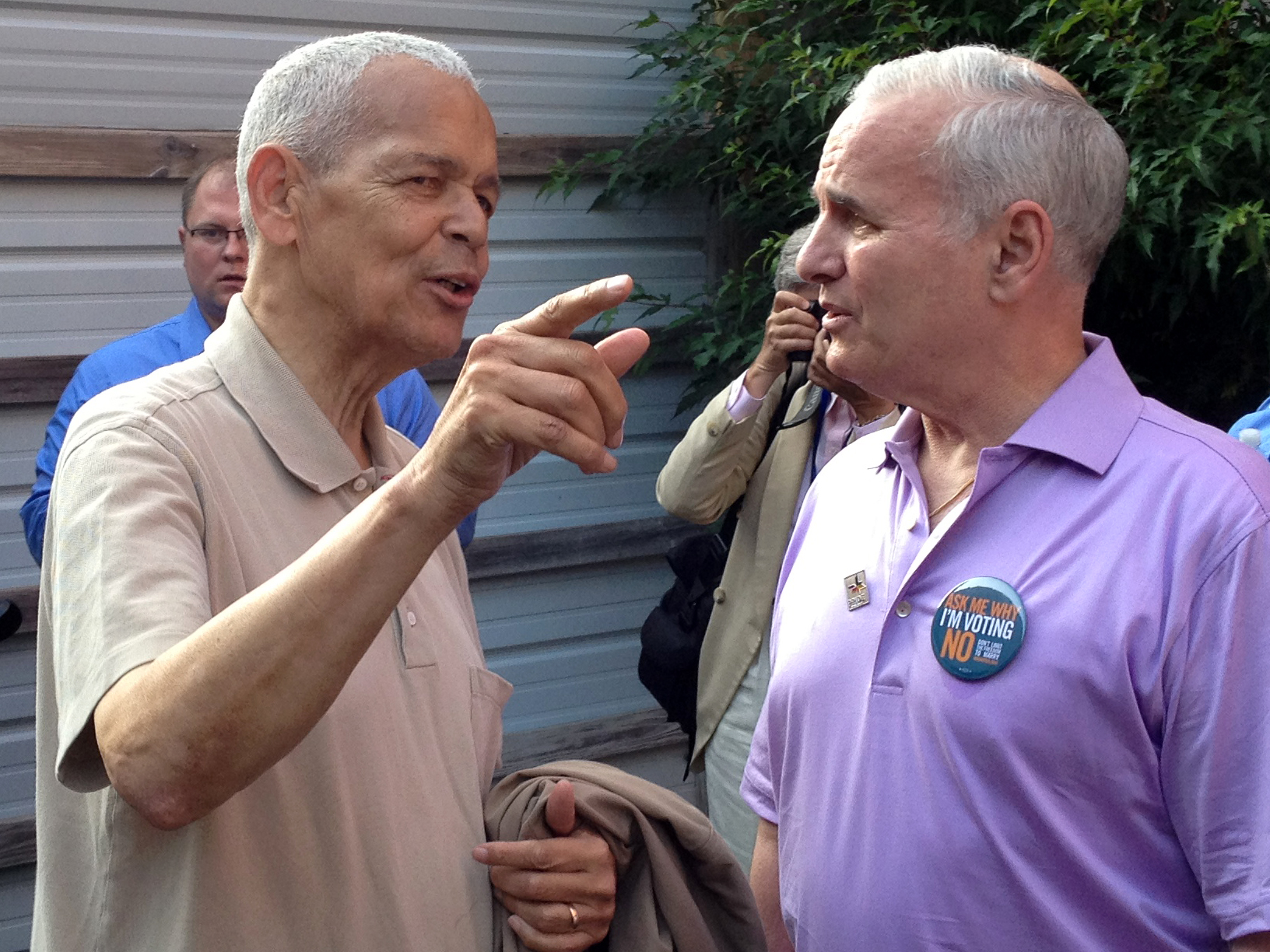
Julian Bond and Minnesota Governor Mark Dayton at a rally opposing a ballot initiative aimed at prohibiting same-sex marriage in that state in June 2012.

Bond was an outspoken supporter of the rights of gays and lesbians. He publicly stated his support for same-sex marriage. Most notably, he boycotted the funeral services for Coretta Scott King on the grounds that the King children had chosen an anti-gay megachurch as the venue. This was in conflict with their mother's longstanding support for the rights of gay and lesbian people.

In a 2005 speech in Richmond, Virginia, Bond said:

African Americans ... were the only Americans who were enslaved for two centuries, but we were far from the only Americans suffering discrimination then and now ... Sexual disposition parallels race. I was born this way. I have no choice. I wouldn't change it if I could. Sexuality is unchangeable.

In a 2007 speech on the Martin Luther King Day Celebration at Clayton State University, Bond said, "If you don't like gay marriage, don't get gay married." His positions pitted elements of the NAACP against religious groups in the Civil Rights Movement who oppose gay marriage. Most resistance came from within the Southern Christian Leadership Conference (SCLC), which was partially blamed for the success of the gay marriage ban amendment in California. On October 11, 2009, Bond appeared at the National Equality March in Washington, D.C., and spoke about the rights of the LGBT community, a speech that was aired live on C-SPAN.

Bond was a strong critic of policies that contribute to anthropogenic climate change. He was among a group of protesters arrested at the White House for civil disobedience in opposition to the Keystone XL pipeline in February 2013.

== Criticism of Republican administration and Tea Party ==
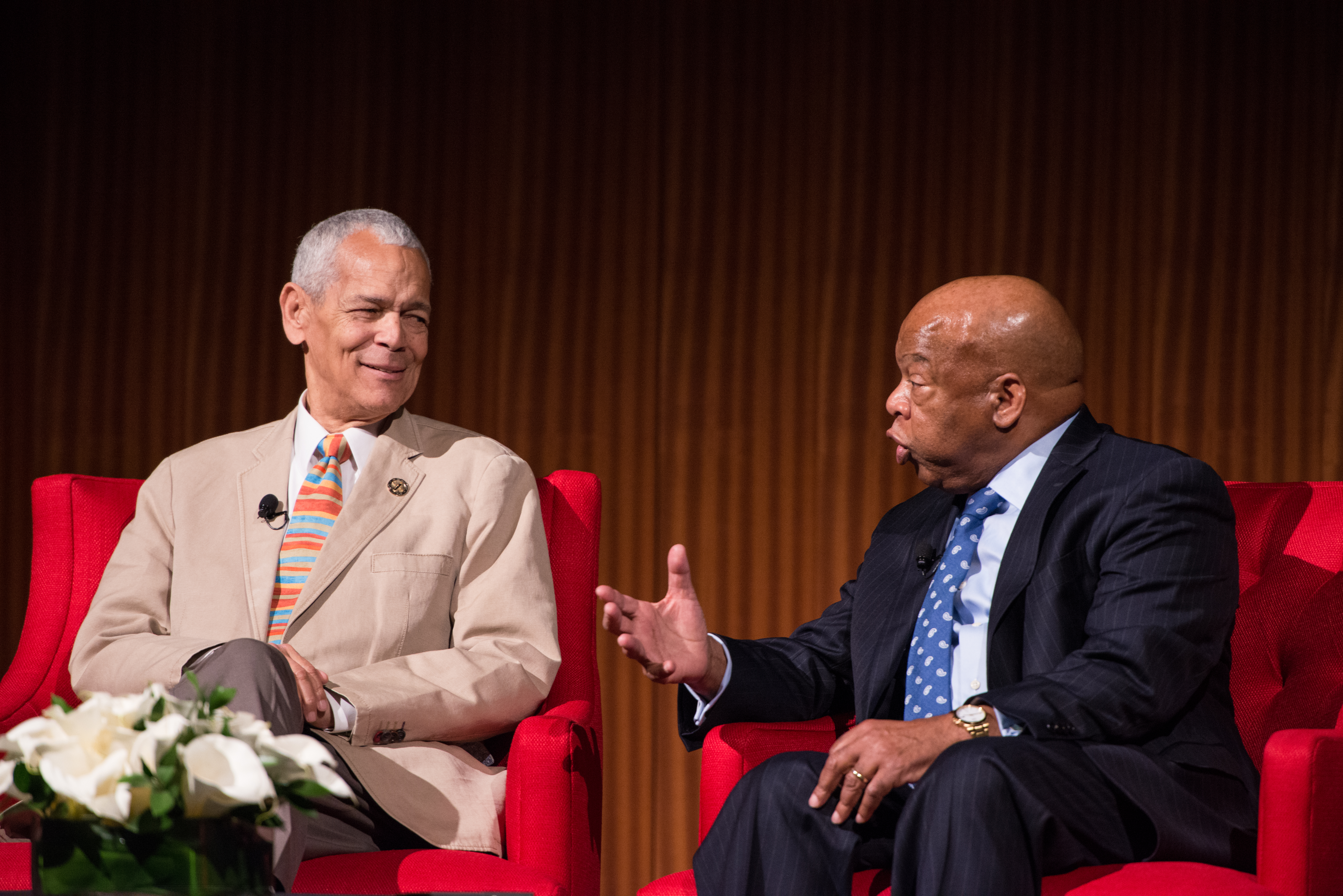
(L-R) Bond with John Lewis, US Representative from Georgia, at the Civil Rights Summit at the LBJ Presidential Library in 2014

Bond was a strong critic of the George W. Bush administration, in large part because he believed it was illegitimate. Twice in 2001, first in February when he spoke to the NAACP board and then in July when he spoke at that organization's national convention, he attacked the administration for selecting Cabinet secretaries "from the Taliban wing of American politics". Bond specifically criticized Attorney General John Ashcroft, who had opposed affirmative action, and Interior Secretary Gale Norton, who defended the Confederacy in a 1996 speech on states' rights. In the selection of these individuals, Bond said, Bush had appeased "the wretched appetites of the extreme right wing and chosen Cabinet officials whose devotion to the Confederacy is nearly canine in its uncritical affection". House Majority Leader Dick Armey responded to Bond's statement with a letter in which he accused NAACP leaders of "racial McCarthyism". Bond later said at the annual NAACP convention that year, that since Bush's election, he had "had his picture taken with more black people than voted for him."

== Work and appearances in media ==
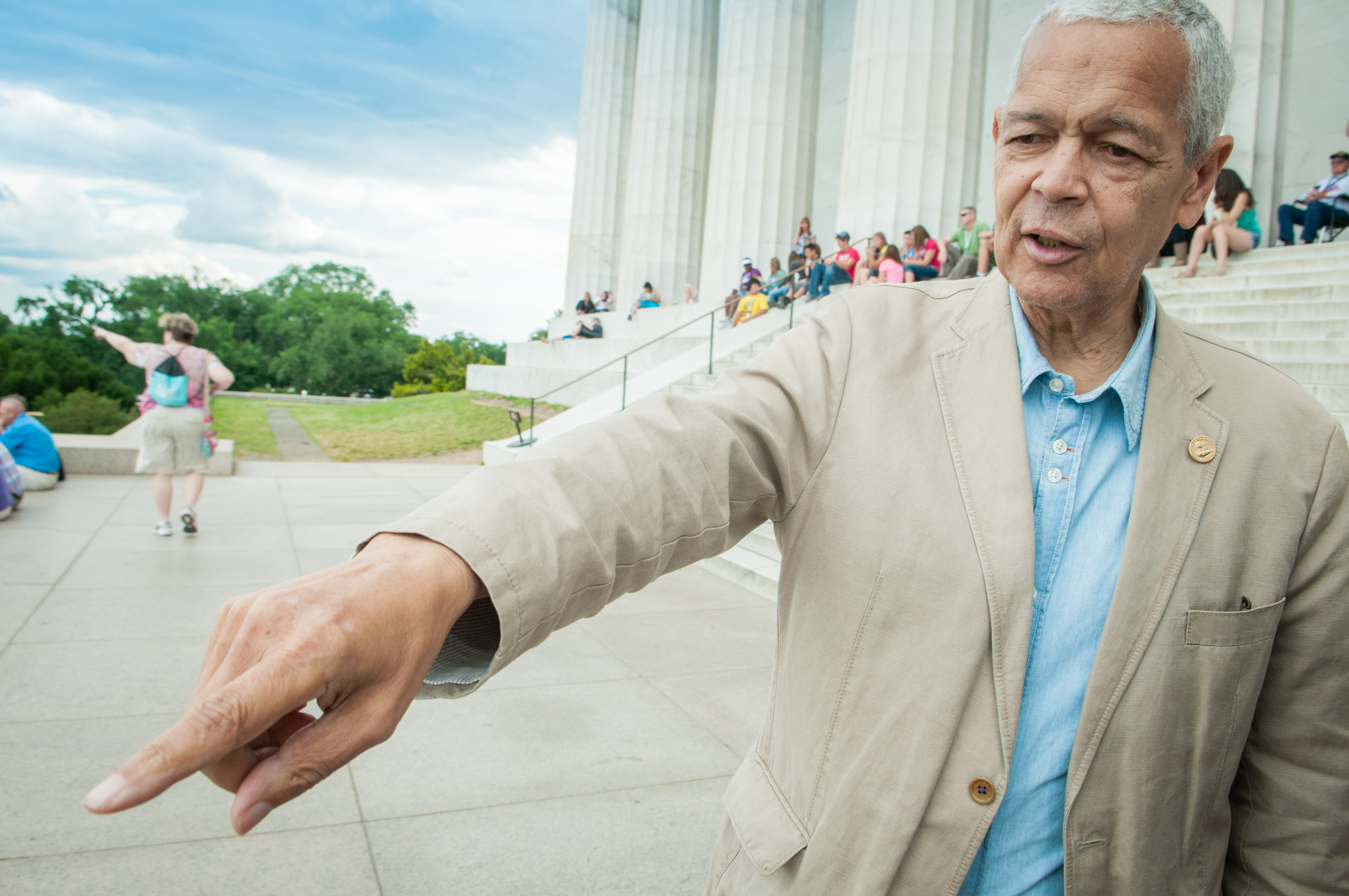
Bond during the filming of Julian Bond (2012)

In 2012, Bond was featured in Julian Bond: Reflections from the Frontlines of the Civil Rights Movement, a documentary film by Eduardo Montes-Bradley.

From 1980 to 1997, Bond hosted America's Black Forum. He was also a commentator for radio's Byline and NBC's The Today Show. He authored the nationally syndicated newspaper column Viewpoint, and narrated the critically acclaimed PBS series Eyes on the Prize in 1987 and 1990.

Bond hosted Saturday Night Live on April 9, 1977, becoming the first black political figure to do so. In the same year, he also appeared in the Richard Pryor vehicle Greased Lightning. In 1978, Bond played himself in the miniseries King. He also had a small appearance playing State Representative John E. White in the movie Ray (2004), and played himself in the movie 5 to 7 (2014).

== Personal life and death ==
On July 28, 1961, Bond married Alice Clopton, a student at Spelman College. They had five children: Phyllis Jane Bond-McMillan, Horace Mann Bond II, Michael Julian Bond (an Atlanta City councilman), Jeffrey Alvin Bond, Rachel Bond and Julia Louise Bond. They divorced on November 10, 1989.

In 1990 Bond married Pamela Sue Horowitz, a former SPLC staff attorney.

Bond died from complications of vascular disease on August 15, 2015, in Fort Walton Beach, Florida, at the age of 75.

== Awards and honors ==
- 2002, he received the National Freedom Award, from the National Civil Rights Museum.
- 2006, he was awarded the National Leadership Award, from the National LGBTQ Task Force
- 2008, he was awarded The Mario Cuomo Act of Courage Award, from Death Penalty Focus
- 2009, he was awarded the Spingarn Medal, from the NAACP.

Among 25 honorary degrees, he was awarded:

- 1999, an honorary LL.D. from Bates College.
- 2008, an honorary degree from George Washington University. Bond was also the 2008 Commencement Keynote Speaker.
- 2009, an honorary L.H.D. from Macalester College.
- 2015, an honorary L.H.D. from Skidmore College.

== Publications ==
- Bond, Julian (1969). Black Candidates: Southern Campaign Experiences. Atlanta: Voter Education Project. ASIN B0007GSIKG.
- Bond, Julian (1972). A Time to Speak, A Time to Act. New York: Simon & Schuster. ISBN 978-0671213459.
- Bond, Julian; Lewis, Andrew (1995). Gonna Sit at the Welcome Table. American Heritage. ISBN 978-0828106399.
- Bond, Julian; Wilson, Sondra Kathryn, eds. (2000). Lift Every Voice and Sing: A Celebration of the Negro National Anthem; 100 Years, 100 Voices. New York: Random House. ISBN 978-0679463153.
- McDowell, Deborah (ed.). The Julian Bond Papers Project. Carter G. Woodson Institute, University of Virginia.
- Julian Bond's papers reside at the Albert and Shirley Small Special Collections Library at the University of Virginia.
- Nationally syndicated column Viewpoint.
- Poems and articles have appeared in a list of national magazines and newspapers.
- Race Man: The Collected Works of Julian Bond, 1960–2015, City Lights Publishers, 2020.

== See also ==
- List of civil rights leaders
- JULIAN
