= Roslyn Pope =

Civil rights activist (1938–2023)

- Born: October 29, 1938
- Died: January 18, 2023 (aged 84); Arlington, Texas, U.S.
- Occupation(s): Civil rights activist, writer

Roslyn Pope (October 29, 1938 – January 18, 2023) was an American civil rights activist and academic. Pope is best remembered as an author of An Appeal for Human Rights while the president of the student government at Spelman College during the 1960 Atlanta Student Movement. The Appeal was first published as a paid advertisement in the Atlanta Constitution in March 1960. Pope received an Honorary Doctor of Humane Letters from Spelman College in 2013 for her years of service as a civil rights activist and educator.

She died on January 18, 2023, in Arlington, Texas.
