= Jesse Hill =

African American civil rights activist

Jesse Hill Jr.
- Born: May 30, 1926; St. Louis, Missouri, U.S.
- Died: December 17, 2012 (aged 86); Atlanta, Georgia, U.S.
- Education: University of Michigan
- Occupations: civil rights leader, business executive, and actuary
- Spouse: Azira Hill
- Parent(s): Jesse Hill; Nancy Dennis Martin

Jesse Hill Jr. (May 30, 1926 – December 17, 2012) was a Black American civil rights activist. He was active in the civic and business communities of the city for more than five decades. Hill was president and chief executive officer of the Atlanta Life Insurance Company, from 1973 to 1992, and was the first African American to be elected president of a chamber of commerce in a major city. During Hill's presidency of the Atlanta Life Insurance Company it became the largest Black-owned life insurance company in the nation. He was a member of the board of directors for the 1996 Summer Olympics in Atlanta.

== Early life ==
Born in 1926 in St. Louis, Missouri, to Nancy Dennis Martin and Jesse Hill, he grew up in a poor socio-economic background and attended public schools in St. Louis. He graduated from Lincoln University in Jefferson City with a bachelor's degree in mathematics and physics in 1947. He received his MBA from the University of Michigan in 1949.

== Career ==
Hill's career in business began in 1949 when he moved to Atlanta, the center of African American entrepreneurship in the United States during the mid-twentieth century. He joined the Atlanta Life Insurance Company, one of the country's largest and most successful black-owned businesses, as assistant actuary; he was only the second African American actuary in the country. When he first moved to the city, Hill lived at the Butler Street YMCA in Atlanta, the headquarters of the city's black leadership during the period. He also volunteered for both the Urban League and the National Association for the Advancement of Colored People (NAACP).

During his first two decades with Atlanta Life, Hill became vice president and the chief actuary of the company. From 1973 to 1992, Jesse Hill Jr. was president and chief executive officer of Atlanta Life, becoming the company's third president and the first not to be a family member of Alonzo Herndon, Atlanta Life's founder. During Hill's tenure as chief executive, Atlanta Life experienced a significant period of growth. Total assets, revenues, profits, and shareholder value all surpassed previous levels. During the 1970s, Atlanta Life Insurance Co. was the largest privately held black business in the country, with 85 million dollars in assets.

Hill and Atlanta Life Insurance Company worked to increase African American access to affordable home-mortgage financing in Georgia, Alabama, Texas, and Florida.

Hill retired from Atlanta Life in 1995.

== Black movement ==
In 1960, along with Herman J. Russell, Jesse Hill Jr. founded the black newspaper Atlanta Inquirer, the second black newspaper in Atlanta.

During the 1950s and 1960s, Hill used his position of prominence in Atlanta's black business community to promote civil rights in Georgia and Alabama. In 1960 Hill, along with other young black leaders of the Atlanta Committee for Cooperative Action, including Grace Towns Hamilton and Whitney Young, produced a survey of Atlanta's black population entitled "A Second Look: The Negro Citizen in Atlanta." This document challenged a common belief in Atlanta's white community that the city was a shining beacon for racial harmony in the South, "the City Too Busy to Hate." As a member of the NAACP's education committee, Hill began recruiting black students to challenge segregation in Georgia's colleges and universities. He met with students Hamilton Holmes and Charlayne Hunter to discuss plans to desegregate Georgia State College (later Georgia State University). At Holmes's request, however, the plans were modified and efforts were focused instead at the University of Georgia (UGA) in Athens. Holmes and Hunter were ultimately the first two African American students admitted to UGA. Hill also organized successful voter registration drives in Atlanta. These efforts aided a campaign which eventually registered an estimated 50,000 new African American voters in Atlanta.

Hill's company was also involved in activities to help black communities across the South. During the 1950s and 1960s, Hill raised money from employees at Atlanta Life and donated the funds to Martin Luther King Jr.'s efforts to promote civil rights. Hill also encouraged employees to donate their time in support of the civil rights movement. Atlanta Life's Montgomery office even employed Rosa Parks as a secretary during the Montgomery bus boycott, which she sparked.

In 1970, as Muhammad Ali's career was on hiatus following his lawsuit against the federal government for refusing to enroll in the Army, Jesse Hill was instrumental in organizing his come-back fight in Atlanta on 26 October 1976. He used his political connections and set up the company House of Sports with Leroy Johnson and Harry Pett to organize the fight. This fight unlocked Ali's career and led to the organization of the Fight of the Century, underlining the influence power of Georgia's black politics.

With Herman Russell, he bred the black "social worker types" to reach for more black representatives in local politics. This new black political class was eventually criticized as the "new old guard" since voters felt those new leaders forgot about the black cause once they had been sworn into office. In 1971, he became a partner of Maynard Jackson's law firm knowing that the young politician would soon run for the seat of mayor of Atlanta. The white community of Atlanta asked Hill to run against Jackson, but he refused. Hill ran political campaigns for Maynard Jackson, who became the first black mayor of Atlanta, as well as for congressman Andrew Young who later became United Nations ambassador.

Governor Jimmy Carter selected Hill to chair the State Board of Regents in 1973. Following Carter's election as president, he chose Hill to chair the Minority Business Resource Center, a group created by Congress.

Jesse Hill was the first black president of the Atlanta Chamber of Commerce and the first black member of the board of directors for Rich's Department Store.

== Education ==
Jesse Hill chaired the All-Citizens Registration Committee and helped to desegregate the Atlanta Public School system. During the 1990s, he received an honorary doctor of laws degree from his alma mater, the University of Michigan. In 2001, in recognition of contributions to the city, Butler Street in Atlanta was renamed in Hill's honor.

Hill served on the boards of directors for eight major U.S. corporations, including Knight Ridder, Delta Air Lines, National Services Industries, and SunTrust, and was a founding director of MARTA, Atlanta's public transportation system. He has also served as the chairman of the board of directors for the Martin Luther King Jr. Center in Atlanta. He was involved in the development of wireless communications in Nigeria.

== Personal life ==
Hill and his wife, Azira, have two children and several grandchildren.

He was a member of the Omega Psi Phi fraternity.

In Atlanta, Butler street was renamed Jesse Hill Junior drive after him.
