= Herman J. Russell =

African American entrepreneur and philanthropist

- Born: Atlanta, Georgia, U.S.
- Died: November 15, 2014 (aged 83); Atlanta, Georgia, U.S.
- Occupation: Entrepreneur

Herman Jerome Russell (December 23, 1930 – November 15, 2014) was an African American businessman who founded a company that became the largest minority business enterprise real estate company in the United States. Russell was a confidante of 1960s civil rights leader Rev. Dr. Martin Luther King, Jr. He became the first black member of the Atlanta Chamber of Commerce. His portfolio expanded to include a diversified list of profitable real estate, construction and food service companies that included H.J. Russell and Company, H.J. Russell Plastering Company, Paradise Management, Inc, DDR International, Concessions International and the Southeast Land Development Company.

== Early life ==
Russell was born on December 23, 1930, in the Summerhill district of Atlanta, Georgia during the era of strict racial segregation. He had a paper route by age eight and learned plastering construction skills from his father Rogers Russell, a master plasterer. At age 11, he worked alongside his father mixing sand and cement to make mortar. At age 12, he opened a shoeshine stand on city-owned land and started subcontracting work to his friends 30 days later. Russell was the youngest of eight children born to his father and mother, Maggie Googson. He attended David T. Howard High School, graduated and then earned a degree in building construction from Tuskegee Institute (now Tuskegee University) in Alabama. He funded his education by building a duplex on a parcel of land he purchased for $125 in 1946 when he was 16. He returned to Atlanta, GA from Alabama in 1952, started his company and married Otelia Hackney, from Union Point in Taliaferro County, GA in 1956. He was a graduate of Clark College (now Clark University) and taught at the Georgia Avenue School (later the Peter James Bryant Elementary School). Russell was known for being thrifty, a trait his father taught him. Rogers’ advice was to save a portion of every amount of money earned, no matter how small. Russell said he heeded the advice in all of his enterprises.

== Construction Projects ==
Herman and his brother, Rogers, started doing construction projects while Herman was still a student in Tuskegee, AL. They were being hired often enough to catch the attention of the local sheriff, who told them to return to Atlanta, GA and not come back. In Atlanta, he first worked with his father in plastering. Then, he set his sights on something bigger by building 12 residential units on South Avenue in Atlanta. His company established a good reputation and Herman used word-of-mouth references to find partners that allowed him to include commercial projects among his portfolio of residential work. He officially founded H.J. Russell & Associates in 1953 and incorporated it in 1957. In 1963 his company received a contract to plaster the Atlanta-Fulton County Stadium, built for the Atlanta Braves baseball team. H. J. Russell & Company added fireproofing to its services and in 1968 was hired to plaster and fireproof the Equitable Building in downtown Atlanta. His receipt of the Equitable Building bid was the largest contract of its kind ever awarded to a black-owned firm. In 1969, he received another prestigious contract to construct Citizens Trust Bank.

Herman’s next accomplishment took place when he became a subcontractor with Holder Construction to build Colony Square in Atlanta, the oldest high-rise development in Midtown. It was the first mixed-use development in the Southeast. H.J. Russell & Company submitted the lowest bid for drywall. Robert Holder, Sr. Holder Construction Company founder, reviewed Russell’s portfolio before deciding to work with him, and was impressed. It was the first of fifty high-profile projects the two men completed together. Holder said in a documentary about Russell, that Delta Air Lines paired the two companies to build its headquarters. Holder and Russell later became friends.

Russell also began landing his own prime contracts. In addition, his company started to get business outside of Atlanta and the state of Georgia. It set up project management division offices in Birmingham, Alabama the mid-1980s. The City of Birmingham, the Birmingham Turf Club, the Birmingham Airport Authority, and the Birmingham/Jefferson County Civic Center Authority all became clients.

One of H.J. Russell & Associates’ most noteworthy construction projects was for the headquarters of one of the world’s most recognized brands, the Coca-Cola Company. H.J. Russell & Company was the general contractor. Herman oversaw every aspect of the 20-story tower, which was completed in 1987. Russell’s company also continued to build residential properties. That division also experienced significant growth in the 1980s.

The 1996 Summer Olympics allowed H. J. Russell & Associates to grow even larger. Russell received contracts, and worked with partners, to build an Olympic stadium and other facilities. The stadium was built in the Summerhill neighborhood where he grew up. The groundbreaking for the project took place in 1993.

Russell is credited with making significant contributions to Atlanta’s modern skyline. His company also continued doing sub-contractor work on large, high-profile projects. Some of the most notable buildings and complexes that were completed under his leadership are, (in alphabetical order):

191 Peachtree

HJ Russell & Company was the material supplier (supervisory contractor of all construction work). Completed in 1992.

Atlanta City Hall

H.J. Russell & Company was a partner in building the Atlanta City Hall Complex. The company was the Construction Manager (CM) for the $2 million project that upgraded Assembly Hall, the Commissioner’s Chamber and surrounding areas.

Georgia Pacific Headquarters

The firm formed a joint venture to build the Georgia Pacific Headquarters in 1982. At the time, it was the second tallest structure in Atlanta.

Hartsfield-Jackson Atlanta International Airport

H.J. Russell was one of the companies contracted to build the Hartsfield Atlanta International Airport's main terminal complex. It moved the company into elite status as a builder of transportation facilities.

Other Projects**

- Atlanta Public Safety Headquarters
- Atlanta Public Schools Instruction & Administration Building
- Atlanta Streetcar
- Auburn Avenue Research Library
- The Carter Center
- Centennial Olympic Park
- Children’s Healthcare of Atlanta’s Hughes Spalding Hospital
- Cosby Learning Center at Spelman College
- Delta Air Lines Worldspan and Operations Centers
- Ebenezer Baptist Church Addition
- Emory Sports Medicine Complex
- Judge Romae T. Powell Juvenile Justice Center (Fulton County)
- Georgia Dome
- Georgia-Pacific Headquarters
- Georgia Perimeter College Student Success Center
- Georgia World Congress Center, Phase IV
- Grady Memorial Hospital
- Hartsfield-Jackson Atlanta International Airport
- Lakewood Amphitheater
- Langston Hughes High School (Fairburn, GA)
- The Manhattan (Sandy Springs area)
- Mercedes-Benz Stadium and Home Depot Backyard
- Morehouse College Dining Hall
- Morris Brown College Administration Building
- National Center for Civil and Human Rights
- Philips Arena
- State Farm Arena Transformation
- Target at Atlantic Station
- Turner Field (now, Georgia State University’s Stadium)
- Water Supply Program (Tunnel Project), City of Atlanta
- Woodruff Park

** Russell named his three children, Donata, Michael and Jerome to run his companies after he retired in 2003. Some of the construction projects listed were headed by Michael who became CEO of H.J. Russell & Company.

== Affiliations ==
Russell served as the first African American member of the Atlanta Chamber of Commerce, and would later become its president. He founded H. J. Russell & Company, the largest minority-owned real estate and construction business in the United States. Russell was inducted into the International Civil Rights Walk of Fame in 2008. Russell was a 1991 recipient of the Horatio Alger Award, and received the title Georgia Trustee from the Georgia Historical Society in 2013. Russell's autobiography Building Atlanta was published in April 2014, shortly before his death.

== Death ==
Herman J. Russell died on November 15, 2014, at the age of 83, in Atlanta, Georgia and was buried at South-View Cemetery.
