= Atlanta University Center =

Educational consortium of HBCUs in Atlanta, Georgia, United States

- Atlanta University Center Consortium, Inc.

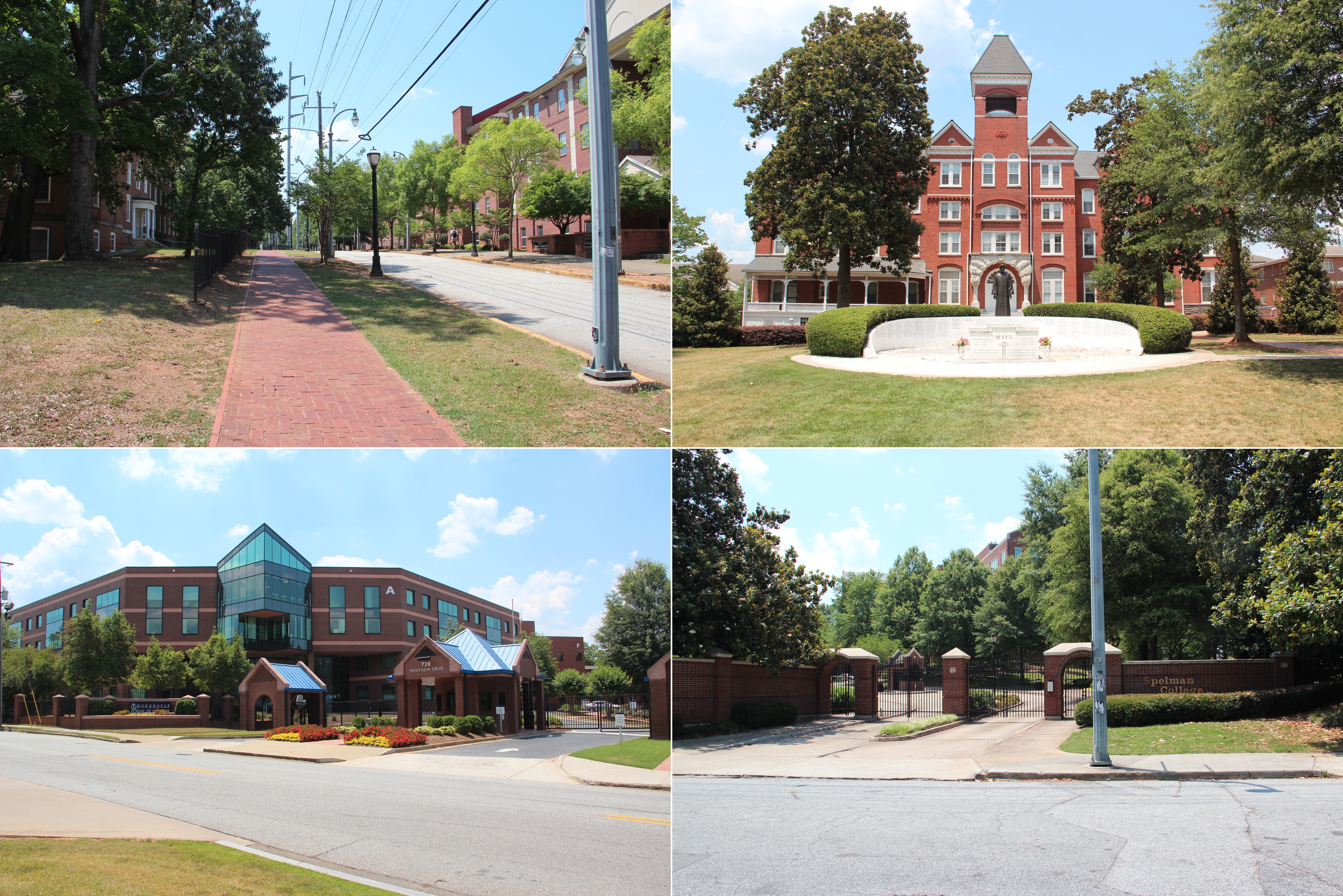
- Clockwise from top left: Clark Atlanta University, Morehouse College, Spelman College, Morehouse School of Medicine
- Abbreviation: AUC Consortium
- Formation: April 1, 1929; 97 years ago
- Type: Non-profit higher education consortium
- Location: Atlanta, Georgia, United States
- Coordinates: 33.749°N 84.411°W
- Website: www.aucenter.edu

The Atlanta University Center Consortium (AUC Consortium) is a collaboration between four historically black colleges and universities (HBCUs) in southwest Atlanta, Georgia: Clark Atlanta University, Spelman College, Morehouse College, and the Morehouse School of Medicine. It is the only contiguous consortium of African-American higher education institutions in the United States. The consortium structure allows for students to cross-register at the other institutions in order to attain a broader collegiate experience. They also share the Robert W. Woodruff Library, a dual degree engineering program, and career planning and placement services and the AUC Data Science Initiative.

== History ==
The Atlanta University Center (AUC) was created in April 1929, when John Hope, then president of both Morehouse College and the former Atlanta University saw the potential gains from such a consortium. Atlanta, Morehouse and Spelman signed the affiliation agreement and became the original members of the AUC. Clark College and Morris Brown College joined in 1957, followed by the Interdenominational Theological Center (ITC) in 1959. Morehouse School of Medicine (which became independent from Morehouse College) joined the AUC in 1983. Morris Brown ended its affiliation with AUC when the school lost its accreditation in December 2002.

The Atlanta University Center has undergone several administrative and governance changes since its inception. In 2004, the business operating as AUC, Inc. was dissolved. A new corporation, known as the AUC Consortium, Inc., was established in its place and Marilyn Jackson became the first female CEO and executive director, with fiduciary responsibilities. In 2011, the current executive director, Dr. Sherry Turner, was selected to expand the Consortium's community revitalization efforts.

=== Former members and closely related institutions ===
To be eligible for membership in the AUC Consortium, a college or university must be regionally accredited, maintain tax-exempt status, and pay a membership assessment. Morris Brown College was a member of the AUC Consortium until it lost its accreditation and federal funding in 2002 during the 1998–2002 tenure of Dr. Dolores E. Cross as school president.

The Interdenominational Theological Center (ITC) is eligible for membership in AUC Consortium, but is not currently a member. However, the ITC is a member of the library sharing consortium of Robert W. Woodruff Library, which is part of the AUC Consortium.

== Location ==
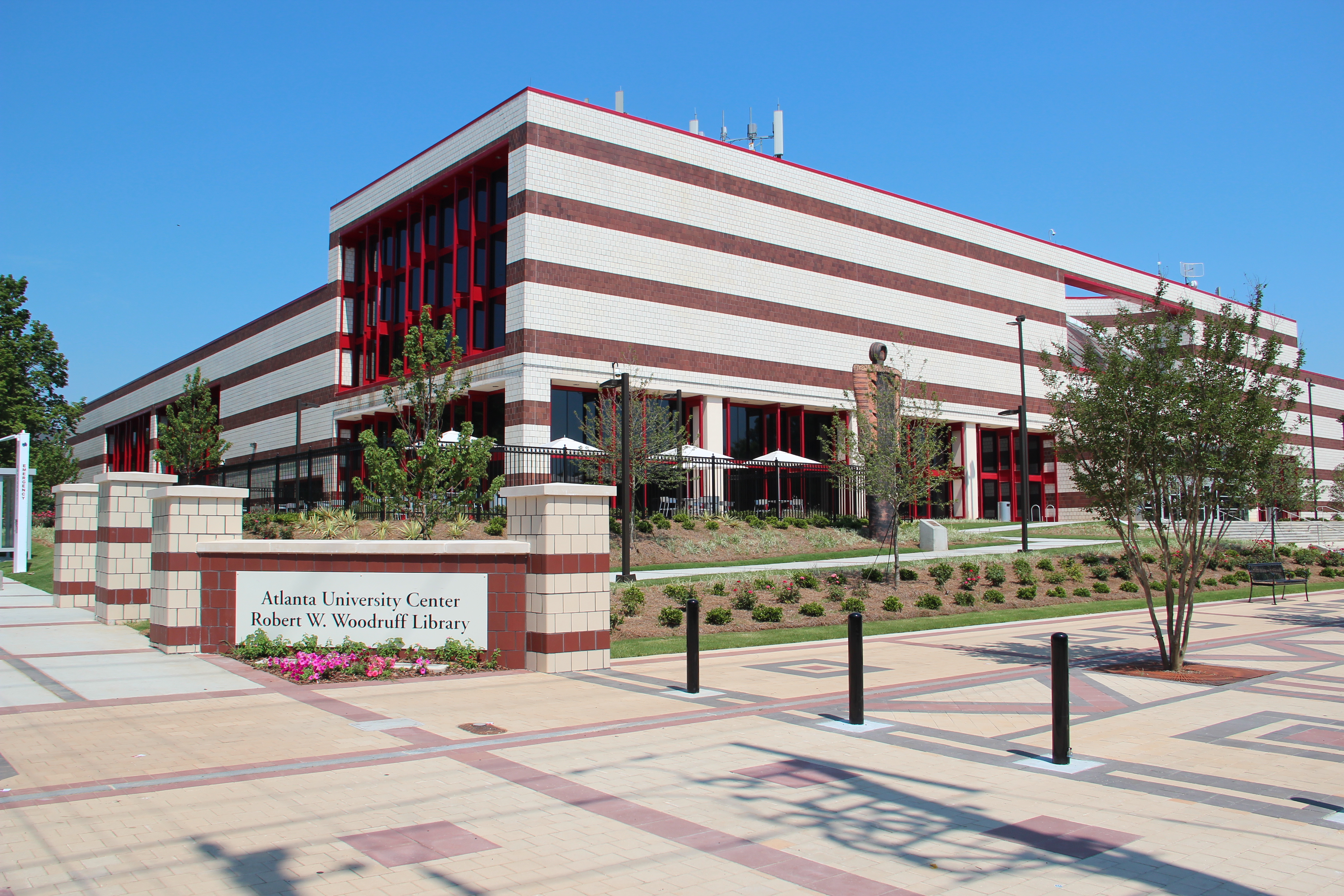
All AUC schools share the Robert W. Woodruff Library

The AUC campuses are located in the Atlanta University Center District, near Downtown Atlanta and immediately southwest of Mercedes-Benz Stadium.

== Art museums ==
The Spelman College Museum of Fine Art and Clark Atlanta University Museum of Art are the two designated art museums in the AUC.

== Olive Branch tradition ==
Olive Branch is a tradition where new first-year students from Clark Atlanta, Morehouse, and Spelman gather for an official AUC unity ceremony and celebration every August before the beginning of the fall semester.

== Homecomings ==
Spelman and Morehouse annually have homecoming festivities in the same week during the fall semester. The parallel homecomings are traditionally referred to as "SpelHouse Homecoming." Clark Atlanta's homecoming is usually in a different week from Spelman and Morehouse. Every few years, all three institutions have homecoming during the same week which is traditionally referred to as "SpArkHouse Homecoming." Homecomings significantly contribute to the cultural identity of the AUC and attract tens of thousands of alumni, students, celebrity guests, and visitors.

== Dual Degree Engineering Program (DDEP) ==
In 1969, the AUC Consortium established a dual degree engineering program that allows its undergraduate students to receive two degrees in approximately five years. Students must first complete a science, technology or mathematics curriculum at an AUC institution, followed by the completion of an engineering curriculum at the engineering institution. Upon successful completing both curricula, students earn two degrees: a Bachelor of Science degree awarded from an AUC institution, and a Bachelor of Science degree in a specific engineering discipline from an affiliated engineering institution. Engineering institutions affiliated with DDEP include Georgia Institute of Technology, University of Michigan, University of Notre Dame, Auburn University, Clarkson University, Indiana University – Purdue University Indianapolis, Missouri University of Science and Technology, Rensselaer Polytechnic Institute, Rochester Institute of Technology, University of Alabama in Huntsville, and North Carolina A&T State University. Since its inception, over 1,100 students have successfully completed the dual degree program.

Spelman never offered engineering degrees which is most common among liberal arts colleges. In 2003, Clark Atlanta's leadership voted to end its engineering programs for budget reasons. In 2019, Morehouse established its first engineering degree program with software engineering.

== AUC Data Science Initiative ==
In 2019, United Health Group donated $8.25 million to the AUC Consortium to establish the AUC Data Science Initiative. This initiative offers technical classes to AUC students who want to specialize in data science or learn data analysis to give them a competitive edge in the job market. A major objective of this initiative is to increase the number of underrepresented minorities in the data science and analytics fields.

== 3+3 Law Program ==
In 2019, three AUC institutions (Morehouse, Spelman, and Clark Atlanta) established an admissions agreement with Syracuse University College of Law allowing their students to receive a bachelor's degree and law degree in approximately six years.

== Spike Fellowship ==
In 2023, Morehouse alumnus Spike Lee and the Gersh Agency, launched a competitive fellowship program for AUC students interested in careers in the entertainment and media industry. Students selected will receive a paid graduate study summer internship, executive mentorships and $25,000 in student loan payoff and debt relief. The goal of the fellowship is to increase diversity in all aspects of the entertainment and media industry.

== Religious institutions ==
Three denominational campus ministry centers have been established to serve the students of the Atlanta University Center. The Roman Catholic Archdiocese of Atlanta operates the Lyke House Catholic Student Center, the Episcopal Diocese of Atlanta operates the Absalom Jones Episcopal Student Center and Chapel, the Absalom Jones Student Center also houses the Lutheran Campus ministry which serves both students and the members of the adjoining community. Two of these campus ministry facilities are named after notable Black American clerics.

== See also ==
- African Americans in Atlanta
- Ashview Heights
- Atlanta Student Movement
- Auburn Avenue Research Library on African American Culture and History
- Freaknik
- Gentrification of Atlanta
- School Daze
- UNCF
- West End
