= International Civil Rights Walk of Fame =

Coordinates: 33°45′25″N 84°22′24″W

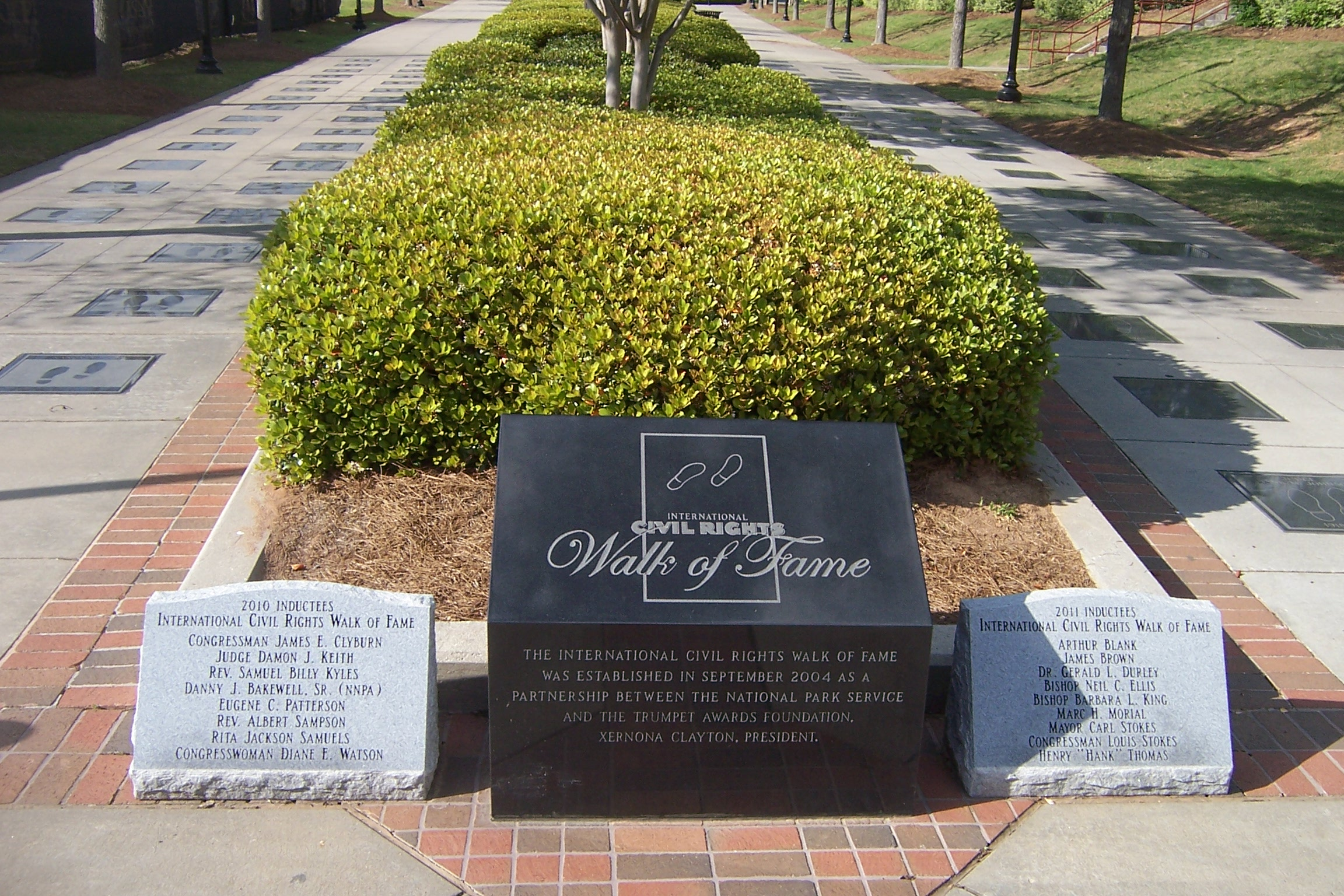
The promenade as seen in 2012

The International Civil Rights Walk of Fame is a historic promenade that honors some of the activists involved in the Civil Rights Movement and other national and global civil rights activists. It was created in 2004, and is located at the Martin Luther King Jr. National Historic Site in Atlanta. The site also contains an outdoor exhibit that showcases, in granite and bronze, the footstep impressions of those honored.

According to the National Park Service, which runs the historic site, the Walk of Fame was created "to give recognition to those courageous soldiers of justice who sacrificed and struggled to make equality a reality for all." The Walk of Fame has enriched historic value and cultural heritage to the area it is located, priming it into a tourist attraction.

The Walk of Fame is a product of Xernona Clayton, an American civil rights activist and executive broadcaster who founded the Trumpet Awards to recognize black excellence. Xernona has also run the Trumpet Awards Foundation since its inception in 2004 which has partnered with the Parks Services in putting on the Walk of Fame. In the National Historic Site location, the Walk of Fame averaged around 800,000 visitors a year.

Beginning in 2012, inductions will be held every two years.

In 2019 it was announced that new additions to the Walk of Fame as well as duplicates of 15 of the existing members would be installed at the National Center for Civil and Human Rights in downtown Atlanta.

== List of inductees ==
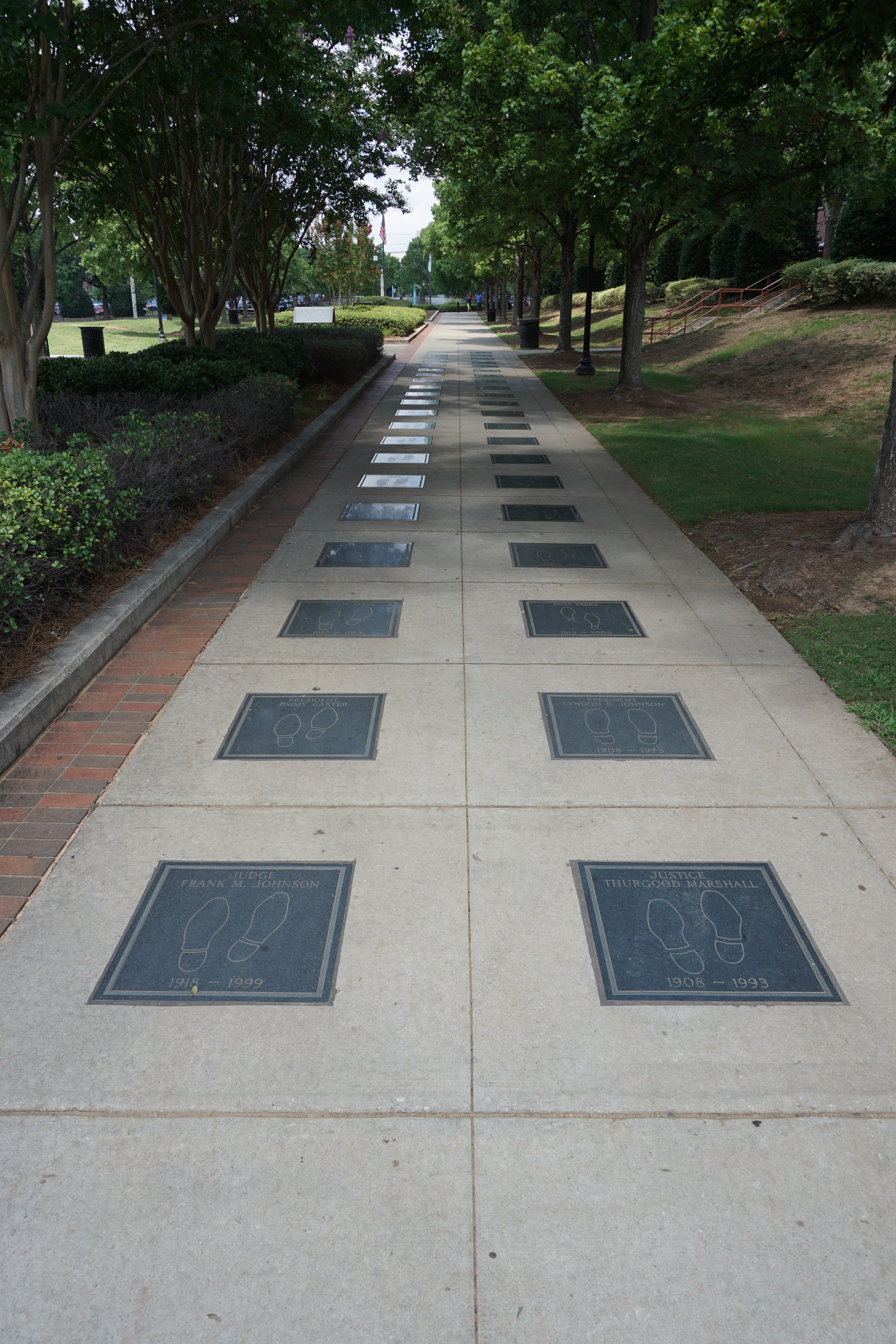
Walk of Fame in 2016

=== 2004 ===
- Ralph David Abernathy, Sr., civil rights leader who had a close and enduring partnership with Dr. King
- Juanita J. Abernathy, civil rights activist
- Ivan Allen, Jr., former mayor of Atlanta during the turbulent civil rights era of the 1960s
- Julian Bond, civil rights leader
- Jimmy Carter, 39th President of the United States
- Medgar Evers, civil rights activist
- Dorothy Height, educator, social activist
- Jesse L. Jackson, Sr., minister, civil rights activist
- Judge Frank M. Johnson, United States Federal judge
- Lyndon Baines Johnson, 36th President of the United States
- John Lewis, politician, civil rights leader
- Joseph E. Lowery, minister, civil rights leader
- Evelyn G. Lowery, civil rights leader
- Thurgood Marshall, former US Supreme Court Justice (1969–1991)
- Rosa Parks, civil rights activist
- Rev. Hosea Williams, civil rights leader
- Andrew Young, civil rights activist, former mayor of Atlanta

=== 2005 ===
- Henry Aaron, baseball player, social activist
- Harry Belafonte, musician, actor, social activist
- John Conyers, Jr., politician, social activist
- Dick Gregory, comedian, social activist
- Maynard H. Jackson, former mayor of Atlanta
- Ralph E. McGill, journalist, social activist
- Fred L. Shuttlesworth, social activist
- Ted Turner, media mogul and philanthropist
- Judge Elbert P. Tuttle, former chief judge of the US Court of Appeals (1960–1967)
- Nancy Wilson, singer, social activist
- Reverend Addie L. Wyatt, Labor leader, civil rights pioneer, pastor

=== 2006 ===
- Reverend Joseph E. Boone, social activist
- Reverend William Holmes Borders, Sr.
- Xernona Clayton, civil rights leader, broadcasting executive
- Lena Horne, singer, actress, social activist
- John E. Jacob, former president and CEO of the National Urban League
- Reverend James Orange, pastor, civil rights activist
- Bernard Parks, politician, social activist
- Archbishop Desmond Tutu, South African cleric, social activist
- William Clinton, 42nd President of the United States
- Stevie Wonder, singer, civil rights activist

=== 2007 ===
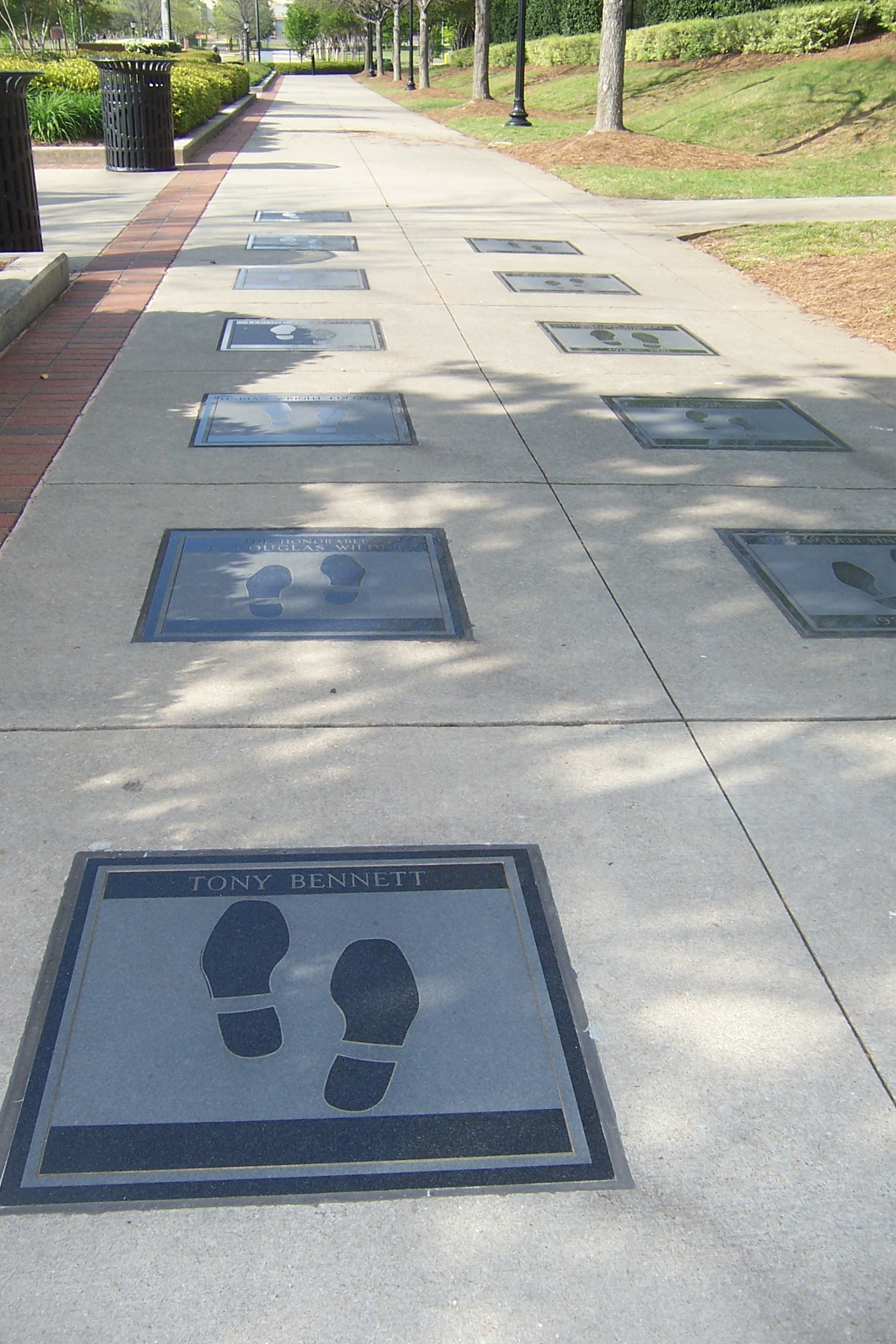
Tony Bennett's footprints in the foreground

- Lerone Bennett, Jr., scholar, author, historian, social activist
- Tony Bennett, singer, social activist
- Marian Wright Edelman, social activist for the rights of children
- Shirley Franklin, 58th mayor of Atlanta
- Frankie Muse Freeman, civil rights attorney
- Joe Louis, boxer, social activist
- Sir Lynden Pindling, former Prime Minister of the Bahamas
- Sidney Poitier, actor, social activist
- Dr. Otis W. Smith, physician
- Maxine Waters, politician, social activist
- L. Douglas Wilder, former governor of Virginia
- Jean Childs Young, civil rights activist and educator

=== 2008 ===
- Dr. Maya Angelou, poet, memoirist, actress
- Senator Edward W. Brooke, social activist, politician
- Tyrone L. Brooks, Sr., social activist, politician
- Sammy Davis Jr., singer, dancer
- Jesse Hill, Jr., business executive
- Dr. Benjamin Hooks, established Benjamin L. Hooks Institute for Social Change
- Clarence B. Jones, Martin Luther King's attorney
- Tom Joyner, radio host
- The Right Honorable Prime Minister Michael Manley, former Prime Minister of Jamaica
- Herman J. Russell, founder and CEO of H. J. Russell and Company
- Dr. Wyatt Tee Walker, executive director of the SCLC 1960-1964

=== 2009 ===
- Rev. Dr. C. M. Alexander
- Danny J. Bakewell, Sr., entrepreneur
- Dr. Erieka Bennett
- Roberto Goizueta, CEO of Coca-Cola
- Cathy Hughes, entrepreneur, radio and television personality, and business executive
- Earvin "Magic" Johnson, basketball great and businessman
- The Links, Incorporated, nonprofit organization of professional African-American women
- Sam Massell, businessman and mayor of Atlanta
- Ernest N. Morial, mayor of New Orleans
- Father Michael L. Pfleger, Roman Catholic priest and social activist
- Rev. Al Sharpton, social justice agitator and media figure
- Congressman William L. Clay, Sr.
- Rev. C. T. Vivian, minister and Martin Luther King associate

=== 2010 ===
- Congressman James E. Clyburn
- Judge Damon J. Keith
- Rev. Samuel Billy Kyles
- National Newspaper Publishers Association
- Eugene C. Patterson
- Rev. Albert Sampson
- Rita Jackson Samuels
- Congresswoman Diane E. Watson

=== 2011 ===
- Arthur Blank
- James Brown
- Rev. Dr. Gerald Durley
- Bishop Neil C. Ellis
- Leon Hall
- Bishop Barbara King
- Marc H. Morial
- Mayor Carl Stokes
- Congressman Louis Stokes
- Henry "Hank" Thomas

=== 2012 ===
- Rev. Willie Bolden & J.T. Johnson and the Civil Rights Foot Soldiers
- Rev. Dr. E. T. Caviness
- Dosan Ahn Chang-ho
- Constance W. Curry
- Fred D. Gray
- Rev. Theodore M. Hesburgh
- Charles J. Ogletree, Jr.
- Dr. Walter F. Young

=== 2014 ===
- Bishop John Hurst Adams
- Governor Roy Barnes
- John Carlos
- Tommie Smith
- Perry Gladstone Christie, Prime Minister of the Bahamas
- Dr. Norman C. Frances
- Harry E. Johnson
- Representative Calvin Smyre
- Thomas N. Todd
- Rev. Jasper W. Williams, Jr.

=== 2016 ===
- Dr. Amelia Boynton Robinson, civil rights activist from the Selma movement
- Rev. Dr. Jamal-Harrison Bryant, pastor, philanthropist, author, motivational speaker
- Rev. Dr. Frederick D. Haynes III, pastor, community activist
- Rev. Dr. Jim Holley, Historic Little Rock Missionary Baptist Church pastor, "ministry of liberation"
- Gordon L. Joyner, influential Atlanta lawyer
- Rev. Dr. Raphael Warnock, pastor, defender of civil and human rights

=== 2019 ===
- Jan Prisby Bryson, business executive
- Thomas W. Dortch Jr., national chair of 100 Black Men of America
- Monica Kaufman Pearson, broadcast journalist
- Sir Franklyn R. Wilson, Bahamian businessman - chairman of Sunshine Holdings Limited

== See also ==
- List of civil rights leaders
