= Xernona Clayton =

American civil rights leader and broadcasting executive

Xernona Clayton Brady
- Born: Xernona Brewster; August 30, 1930 (age 96); Muskogee, Oklahoma, U.S.
- Education: Tennessee State University (BA)
- Occupation: Broadcasting executive
- Known for: Civil rights activism
- Spouse(s): Ed Clayton (m. 1957; death 1966) Paul L. Brady (m. 1974)

Xernona Clayton Brady (née Brewster, born August 30, 1930) is an American civil rights leader and broadcasting executive. During the Civil Rights Movement, she worked for the National Urban League and Southern Christian Leadership Conference, where she became involved in the work of Dr. Martin Luther King Jr. Later, Clayton went into television, where she became the first African American from the southern United States to host a daily prime time talk show. She became corporate vice president for Turner Broadcasting.

Clayton created the Trumpet Foundation. She was instrumental in the development of the International Civil Rights Walk of Fame that is run in partnership with the Trumpet Awards Foundation to honor the achievements of African Americans and civil rights advocates. She convinced a Grand Dragon of the Ku Klux Klan to denounce the Klan. Clayton has been honored by the National Association for the Advancement of Colored People and the city of Atlanta for her work.

== Early life ==
Xernona and her twin sister Xenobia were born in Muskogee, Oklahoma, the daughters of Reverend James and Elliott (Lillie) Brewster. Her parents were administrators of Indian affairs in Muskogee, Oklahoma. In 1952, Clayton earned her undergraduate degree with honors from Tennessee State Agricultural and Industrial College in Nashville, Tennessee. She majored in music and minored in education. At Tennessee State, Clayton became a member of the Alpha Kappa Alpha sorority.

== Career ==
Clayton began her career in the Civil Rights Movement with the National Urban League in Chicago, working undercover to investigate racial discrimination committed by employers against African Americans. Clayton moved to Atlanta in 1965, where she organized events for the Southern Christian Leadership Conference (SCLC), under the direction of Martin Luther King Jr. She developed a deep friendship with Dr. King's wife, Coretta Scott King. Clayton and Scott King traveled together on concert tours. Although Clayton did not march with King, citing a fear of being arrested, Clayton helped plan King's marches.

In 1966, Clayton coordinated the Doctors' Committee for Implementation, a group of African American physicians who worked for and achieved the desegregation of all Atlanta hospitals. The Doctors' Committee served as a model for nationwide hospital desegregation, and was honored by the National Medical Association.

Clayton then headed the Atlanta Model Cities program, a federally funded group dedicated to improving the quality of desegregated neighborhoods. Clayton met Calvin Craig, the Grand Dragon of the Georgia Ku Klux Klan, through the Model Cities program, as Craig served in a policy position with the organization. Craig cited Clayton's influence when he decided to denounce the Klan in April 1968.

In 1967, Clayton became the first Southern African American to host a daily prime time talk show. The show was broadcast on WAGA-TV in Atlanta and was renamed, The Xernona Clayton Show. Clayton joined Turner Broadcasting in 1979 as a producer of documentary specials. In the 1980s, she served as director of public relations for Turner Broadcasting. In 1988, Turner Broadcasting promoted Clayton to corporate vice president for urban affairs, assigning her to direct Turner projects and serve as a liaison between Turner Broadcasting and civic groups in Atlanta and throughout the country. Clayton retired from Turner Broadcasting in 1997, choosing to call the retirement a "professional transition".

Clayton served on the board of directors of the King Center for Nonviolent Social Change. She served on the Board of Review for the Georgia's Department of Labor. In 1991, she published an autobiography, I've Been Marching All The Time, a title inspired by King. The book focused on her life and her views of the Civil Rights Movement.

=== Trumpet Awards ===
In 1993, Clayton, with Turner Broadcasting, created the Trumpet Awards to honor achievements of African Americans. She serves as the chair, president, and CEO of the Trumpet Awards Foundation that was formed in late 2004. In early 2004, Clayton created the International Civil Rights Walk of Fame. The Walk of Fame is put on in partnership with the Trumpet Awards Foundation. In 2016, the Trumpet Awards were sold by the foundation to Bounce TV, which board member Andrew Young had co-founded. The now "Bounce TV Trumpet Awards" give out an award named for Xernona. Some of the members of the board have included Ted Turner, Thomas Dortch, Danny Blakewell and Vivian Pickard. Harold Lewis was chair until 2013 when Clayton was elected.

== Personal life ==
Clayton is a Baptist and is a member of the Ebenezer Baptist Church, where Dr. Martin Luther King Jr. was the pastor.

Clayton was married to Ed Clayton (who also worked with Dr. King) from 1957 until his death in 1966. She co-authored a revised edition of her late husband's biography of Martin Luther King Jr. that is titled The Peaceful Warrior.

Following her first husband's death, Clayton married Paul L. Brady, the first African American to be appointed as a Federal Administrative Law Judge, in 1974. Brady and Clayton have two children from Brady's previous marriage, Laura and Paul Jr.

The Bahamas has been one of her favorite places to visit.

== Honors ==
Tennessee State University honored Clayton at their Blue and White All-Star Academy Awards in 2005. Clayton's footprints were added to the International Civil Rights Walk of Fame in 2006. On May 1, 2011, Clayton received the James Weldon Johnson Lifetime Achievement Award from the Detroit branch of the National Association for the Advancement of Colored People (NAACP). She received the Local Community Service Award from Spelman College in 2004.

In September 2011, the Atlanta City Council renamed a street and a plaza at Hardy Ivy Park in downtown Atlanta in Clayton's honor. In conjunction with the National Newspaper Publishers Association, the AFC Enterprises Foundation awards an annual Xernona Clayton Black Press Scholarship amounting to $10,000 to a student pursuing a doctoral degree in journalism. The Mattel Toy Company created a "Xernona Clayton Barbie" doll in her honor in 2004.

On International Women's Day in 2023, the City of Atlanta unveiled a statue of Clayton in the plaza also named in her honor on West Peachtree Street. The location in downtown Atlanta was symbolic for Clayton, as she had been "thrown out of a hotel" on the street during the Civil Rights Movement. Representatives from Ghana and the Bahamas attended.

== Autobiography ==
- Clayton, Xernona; Gulliver, Hal (1991). I've Been Marching All The Time. Longstreet Press. ISBN 0929264878.
