= Barbara Lewis (disambiguation) =

Barbara Lewis (born 1943) is an American singer and songwriter.

Barbara Lewis may also refer to:

- Barbara Bel Geddes (1922–2005), American actress and author, married name Lewis
- Barbara Lewis King (1930–2020), American bishop
- Barbara Lewis Shenfield (1919–2004), British academic and politician
- Barbara Paulson (1928–2023, née Lewis), American human computer
- Barbara Lewis, American singer of the R&B group Creative Source
