= Barbara King =

Barbara King may refer to:

- Barbara J. King (born 1956), professor of anthropology
- Barbara Lewis King (1930–2020), bishop of the International New Thought Christian Movement of Churches
