= 2024 United States presidential election in Georgia =

- November 5, 2024
- Turnout: 72.9% (▲6.7 pp)

Nominee	Donald Trump	Kamala Harris
Party	Republican	Democratic
Home state	Florida	California
Running mate	JD Vance	Tim Walz
Electoral vote	16	0
Popular vote	2,663,117	2,548,017
Percentage	50.73%	48.53%

Trump
40–50%
50–60%
60–70%
70–80%
80–90%
90–100%
Harris
40–50%
50–60%
60–70%
70–80%
80–90%
90–100%
Tie/No data
President before election
Joe Biden
Democratic
Elected President
Donald Trump
Republican

The 2024 United States presidential election in Georgia took place on Tuesday, November 5, 2024, as part of the 2024 United States elections in which all 50 states plus the District of Columbia participated. Georgia voters chose electors to represent them in the Electoral College via a popular vote. The state of Georgia has 16 electoral votes in the Electoral College, following reapportionment due to the 2020 United States census in which it neither gained nor lost a seat.

Prior to the election, Georgia was considered to be a crucial swing state; rapid population growth in Georgia, particularly in Metro Atlanta, has led the state to become politically competitive in recent years.

Republican Donald Trump, representing neighboring Florida, flipped Georgia back into the Republican column, winning with a majority and a margin of 2.20% over Democrat Kamala Harris. Despite Trump's win, Harris made modest gains in the South Atlanta suburbs, further consolidating Democratic support in urban and suburban areas and signaling growing potential challenges for Republicans in future elections federally, though Republicans did see a rebound in the northern parts of the Atlanta Metro including Fulton County and Gwinnett County. Republicans also saw significant gains in the rest of the state. This was the closest margin of victory for a Republican in Georgia since 1996, with Georgia again voting to the left of the neighboring states of North Carolina and Florida, as well as Arizona and Nevada, signaling that Georgia's political future is uncertain despite its red tilt.

Georgia voted just 0.72% to the right of the nation, the closest Georgia has come to voting to the left of the nation since Jimmy Carter won his home state in 1980. Only the three Rust Belt states of Pennsylvania, Michigan, Wisconsin were closer in margin of victory than Georgia. Georgia and North Carolina were the only battleground states in 2024 in which Trump's performance did not shift to the right relative to his 2016 performance.

Even though Harris lost the state, Georgia was one of the few states to have many counties shift significantly leftward, mostly in the Atlanta Metro, and Harris won a slightly higher share of the state vote than she won nationally (48.3%). Harris made her largest gain compared to 2020 in Henry County, with the county swinging leftward by almost 9%.

Trump received more than 2.66 million votes, setting a record for most votes cast for any candidate in the history of Georgia and became the second Republican ever to carry the state twice after George W. Bush in 2000 and 2004.

== Primary elections ==
=== Democratic primary ===
The Georgia Democratic primary was held on March 12, 2024.

2024 Georgia Democratic pres. primary
Candidate	Votes	%	Delegates
Joe Biden (incumbent)	276,141	95.19	108
Marianne Williamson	8,673	2.99	0
Dean Phillips (withdrawn)	5,271	1.82	0
Total	290,085	100%	108

=== Republican primary ===
The Georgia Republican primary was held on March 12, 2024.

Georgia Republican primary, March 12, 2024
Candidate	Votes	Percentage	Actual delegate count		
Candidate	Votes	Percentage	Bound	Unbound	Total
Donald Trump	497,594	84.49%	59	0	59
Nikki Haley (withdrawn)	77,902	13.23%	0	0	0
Ron DeSantis (withdrawn)	7,457	1.27%	0	0	0
Chris Christie (withdrawn)	2,054	0.35%	0	0	0
Tim Scott (withdrawn)	1,398	0.24%	0	0	0
Vivek Ramaswamy (withdrawn)	1,244	0.21%	0	0	0
Asa Hutchinson (withdrawn)	383	0.07%	0	0	0
Ryan Binkley (withdrawn)	377	0.06%	0	0	0
David Stuckenberg	243	0.04%	0	0	0
Doug Burgum (withdrawn)	161	0.03%	0	0	0
Perry Johnson (withdrawn)	134	0.02%	0	0	0
Total:	588,947	100.00%	59	0	59

== General election ==
=== Predictions ===
Source	Ranking	As of
The Cook Political Report	Tossup	November 4, 2024
Sabato's Crystal Ball	Lean R (flip)	November 4, 2024
Decision Desk HQ/The Hill	Tossup	November 4, 2024
CNN	Tossup	November 4, 2024
CNalysis	Likely D	November 4, 2024
The Economist	Tossup	November 4, 2024
538	Tossup	November 5, 2024
Inside Elections	Tossup	November 4, 2024
NBC News	Tossup	November 4, 2024

=== Voting rule changes ===
On July 29, 2024, the state added another way to cancel a voter's registration through an online portal, which has drawn criticism from groups like Fair Fight Action, who worried that it would be abused. By August 5, cybersecurity researcher Jason Parker discovered a vulnerability in Georgia's voter cancellation portal that allowed users to bypass the requirement for a driver's license number, enabling the submission of voter registration cancellations with minimal, publicly available information. The discovery drew attention to weaknesses in the system and the importance of continued efforts to secure election infrastructure.

In August 2024, the Georgia State Election Board enacted two new rules that could deputize local election officials more discretion on whether they certify the election, contrary to state and national precedent. The Democratic party has filed a lawsuit to stop the new rules from taking effect, which a judge agreed with on October 16, blocking the new rule.

=== Ballot access ===
Votes for Claudia De la Cruz and Cornel West were not counted even though they appeared on the ballot. After an administrative law judge disqualified Claudia De la Cruz and Cornel West from the ballot due to their electors not registering in their own name, Secretary of State Brad Raffensperger overruled the judge on August 29, 2024. Republicans have been working to get West and De la Cruz on the ballot, while Democrats have been working to keep them off. If the ruling were upheld, it would be the first time since 1946 that more than four candidates would be on the ballot. On September 12, 2024, a judge disqualified both West and De la Cruz from running for president in Georgia. On September 25, the Georgia Supreme Court unanimously confirmed the ruling, keeping votes for De la Cruz and West from counting even though Raffensperger kept both on the ballot, saying there was not enough time to reprint the ballots.

=== Election security ===
In early 2023, Georgia's state legislature denied the Georgia Secretary of State's $25 million request to implement the 2022 security update for Dominion Voting Systems machines before the 2024 elections. However, QR codes will be eliminated by 2026 in favor of text the voter can read to ensure their ballot was marked correctly. Audits will be used to gauge how the machines are faring in 2024.

As of October 2024, the Georgia State Election Board recommended that specific people serve as election monitors in Fulton County despite having no authority to make this recommendation. Each county decides who monitors each election precinct.

As of the 28th of January 2026, the FBI is executing a search warrant at Fulton County elections office near Atlanta. An FBI spokesperson said agents were "executing a court authorized law enforcement action" at the county's main election office in Union City.

=== Polling ===
Kamala Harris vs. Donald Trump

Aggregate polls

Source of poll aggregation	Dates administered	Dates updated	Kamala Harris Democratic	Donald Trump Republican	Other / Undecided (Note: Calculated by taking the difference of 100% and all other candidates combined.)	Margin
270ToWin	October 22 – November 4, 2024	November 5, 2024	47.5%	48.7%	3.8%	Trump +1.2%
538	through November 4, 2024	November 5, 2024	47.5%	48.2%	4.3%	Trump +0.7%
Silver Bulletin	through November 4, 2024	November 5, 2024	47.9%	48.9%	3.2%	Trump +1.0%
The Hill/DDHQ	through November 4, 2024	November 5, 2024	47.9%	49.6%	2.5%	Trump +1.7%
Average			47.7%	48.9%	3.4%	Trump +1.2%

Poll source	Date(s) administered	Sample size (Note: Key: A – all adults RV – registered voters LV – likely voters V – unclear)	Margin of error	Kamala Harris Democratic	Donald Trump Republican	Other / Undecided
HarrisX	November 3–5, 2024	1,880 (RV)	± 2.3%	45%	48%	7%
HarrisX	November 3–5, 2024	1,880 (RV)	± 2.3%	49% (Note: With voters who lean towards a given candidate)	51%	–
HarrisX	November 3–5, 2024	1,659 (LV)	± 2.3%	47%	49%	4%
HarrisX	November 3–5, 2024	1,659 (LV)	± 2.3%	48%	52%	–
AtlasIntel	November 3–4, 2024	1,112 (LV)	± 3.0%	48%	50%	2%
InsiderAdvantage (R)	November 2–3, 2024	800 (LV)	± 3.7%	48%	49%	3% (Note: "Other" with 1%)
Patriot Polling	November 1–3, 2024	818 (RV)	± 3.0%	49%	50%	1%
AtlasIntel	November 1–2, 2024	1,174 (LV)	± 3.0%	48%	50%	2%
Emerson College	October 30 – November 2, 2024	800 (LV)	± 3.4%	49%	50%	1% (Note: "Someone else" with 1%)
Emerson College	October 30 – November 2, 2024	800 (LV)	± 3.4%	49%	50%	1%
The New York Times/Siena College	October 24 – November 2, 2024	1,004 (RV)	± 3.5%	46%	46%	8%
The New York Times/Siena College	October 24 – November 2, 2024	1,004 (LV)	± 3.5%	48%	47%	5%
ActiVote	October 15 – November 2, 2024	400 (LV)	± 4.9%	49%	51%	–
AtlasIntel	October 30–31, 2024	1,212 (LV)	± 3.0%	48%	50%	2%
YouGov (Note: Poll conducted for The Times, Stanford University, Arizona State University, and Yale University)	October 25–31, 2024	984 (RV)	± 3.9%	48%	50%	2%
YouGov	October 25–31, 2024	939 (LV)	± 3.9%	48%	50%	2%
Morning Consult	October 21–30, 2024	1,009 (LV)	± 3.0%	48%	50%	2%
AtlasIntel	October 25–29, 2024	1,429 (LV)	± 3.0%	48%	51%	1%
Rasmussen Reports (R) (Note: Poll sponsored by American Thinker)	October 25–28, 2024	910 (LV)	± 3.0%	46%	51%	3% (Note: "Other" with 2%)
SoCal Strategies (R) (Note: Poll sponsored by On Point Politics & Red Eagle Politics)	October 26–27, 2024	658 (LV)	± 3.8%	49%	50%	1%
Trafalgar Group (R)	October 24–26, 2024	1,087 (LV)	± 2.9%	46%	48%	6%
CES/YouGov	October 1–25, 2024	2,682 (A)	–	48%	49%	3%
CES/YouGov	October 1–25, 2024	2,663 (LV)	–	46%	51%	3%
National Public Affairs	October 21–24, 2024	829 (LV)	± 3.4%	47%	49%	4%
Marist College	October 17–22, 2024	1,356 (RV)	± 3.5%	49%	48%	3% (Note: "Another party's candidates" with 1%)
Marist College	October 17–22, 2024	1,193 (LV)	± 3.9%	49%	49%	2%
Bloomberg/Morning Consult	October 16–20, 2024	914 (RV)	± 3.0%	48%	49%	3%
Bloomberg/Morning Consult	October 16–20, 2024	855 (LV)	± 3.0%	48%	50%	2%
AtlasIntel	October 12–17, 2024	1,411 (LV)	± 3.0%	48%	50%	2%
ActiVote	October 1–17, 2024	400 (LV)	± 4.9%	49%	51%	–
TIPP Insights (Note: Poll sponsored by American Greatness)	October 14–16, 2024	1,029 (RV)	± 3.5%	49%	46%	5%
TIPP Insights	October 14–16, 2024	813 (LV)	± 3.5%	48%	49%	3%
InsiderAdvantage (R)	October 14–15, 2024	800 (LV)	± 3.7%	47%	49%	4%
Morning Consult	October 6–15, 2024	1,002 (LV)	± 3.0%	48%	49%	3%
The Washington Post/Schar School	September 30 – October 15, 2024	730 (RV)	± 4.5%	50%	44%	6%
The Washington Post/Schar School	September 30 – October 15, 2024	730 (LV)	± 4.5%	51%	46%	3%
Quinnipiac University	October 10–14, 2024	1,328 (LV)	± 2.7%	46%	52%	2%
RMG Research (Note: Poll sponsored by the Napolitan Institute)	October 7–10, 2024	731 (LV)	± 3.6%	47%	49%	4% (Note: "Some other candidate" with 2%)
RMG Research	October 7–10, 2024	731 (LV)	± 3.6%	47%	50%	3%
Fabrizio, Lee & Associates (R)/McLaughlin & Associates (R) (Note: Poll sponsored by Trump's campaign)	October 6–9, 2024	800 (LV)	± 3.5%	45%	50%	5%
Trafalgar Group (R)	October 7–8, 2024	1,089 (LV)	± 2.9%	45%	46%	9% (Note: "Other" with 4%)
Emerson College	October 5–8, 2024	1,000 (LV)	± 3.0%	48%	49%	3%
Emerson College	October 5–8, 2024	1,000 (LV)	± 3.0%	50%	50%	–
The Wall Street Journal	September 28 – October 8, 2024	600 (RV)	± 5.0%	48%	46%	6%
OnMessage Inc. (R) (Note: Poll conducted for the Article III Project)	September 24 – October 2, 2024	500 (LV)	± 4.4%	44%	47%	9%
InsiderAdvantage (R)	September 29–30, 2024	800 (LV)	± 3.7%	48%	48%	4%
Quinnipiac University	September 25–29, 2024	942 (LV)	± 3.2%	45%	50%	5%
Global Strategy Group (D)/North Star Opinion Research (R) (Note: Poll sponsored by the Peter G. Peterson Foundation)	September 23–29, 2024	400 (LV)	± 4.9%	47%	47%	6%
AtlasIntel	September 20–25, 2024	1,200 (LV)	± 3.0%	49%	50%	1%
Cook Political Report/BSG (R)/GS Strategy Group (D)	September 19–25, 2024	411 (LV)	–	47%	49%	4%
Bloomberg/Morning Consult	September 19–25, 2024	989 (RV)	± 3.0%	48%	47%	5%
Bloomberg/Morning Consult	September 19–25, 2024	913 (LV)	± 3.0%	49%	49%	2%
Fox News	September 20−24, 2024	1,006 (RV)	± 3.0%	51%	48%	1%
Fox News	September 20−24, 2024	707 (LV)	± 3.5%	51%	48%	1%
CBS News/YouGov	September 20–24, 2024	1,441 (RV)	± 3.5%	49%	51%	–
Marist College	September 19−24, 2024	1,420 (RV)	± 3.6%	49%	48%	3%
Marist College	September 19−24, 2024	1,220 (LV)	± 3.9%	49%	50%	1%
The Bullfinch Group (Note: Poll conducted for The Independent Center)	September 20–23, 2024	600 (RV)	± 4.0%	49%	47%	4%
Rasmussen Reports (R)	September 19–22, 2024	1,152 (LV)	± 3.0%	47%	50%	3%
Rasmussen Reports (R)	September 19–22, 2024	1,152 (LV)	± 3.0%	47%	51%	2%
The New York Times/Siena College	September 17–21, 2024	682 (RV)	± 4.6%	44%	48%	8%
The New York Times/Siena College	September 17–21, 2024	682 (LV)	± 4.6%	45%	49%	6%
TIPP Insights	September 16–18, 2024	1,046 (RV)	± 3.5%	48%	45%	7%
TIPP Insights	September 16–18, 2024	835 (LV)	± 3.5%	48%	48%	9%
Emerson College	September 15–18, 2024	975 (LV)	± 3.1%	47%	50%	3% (Note: "Someone else" with 2%)
Emerson College	September 15–18, 2024	975 (LV)	± 3.1%	48%	50%	2%
Morning Consult	September 9−18, 2024	1,347 (LV)	± 3.0%	48%	49%	3%
Trafalgar Group (R)	September 11–13, 2024	1,098 (LV)	± 2.9%	45%	46%	9%
ActiVote	August 8 – September 10, 2024	400 (LV)	± 4.9%	50%	50%	–
Quinnipiac University	September 4–8, 2024	969 (LV)	± 3.2%	46%	49%	5%
Morning Consult	August 30 – September 8, 2024	1,405 (LV)	± 3.0%	48%	48%	4%
Mainstreet Research/Florida Atlantic University	September 5–6, 2024	647 (RV)	± 3.9%	44%	47%	9% (Note: "Another candidate" with 4%)
Mainstreet Research/Florida Atlantic University	September 5–6, 2024	567 (LV)	± 3.9%	45%	47%	8% (Note: "Another candidate" with 2%)
Patriot Polling	September 1–3, 2024	814 (RV)	–	48%	49%	3%
InsiderAdvantage (R)	August 29–31, 2024	800 (LV)	± 3.7%	48%	48%	4%
Emerson College	August 25–28, 2024	800 (LV)	± 3.4%	49%	48%	3%
Emerson College	August 25–28, 2024	800 (LV)	± 3.4%	50%	49%	1%
Bloomberg/Morning Consult	August 23–26, 2024	737 (LV)	± 4.0%	50%	47%	3%
Bloomberg/Morning Consult	August 23–26, 2024	801 (RV)	± 3.0%	49%	47%	4%
Fox News	August 23–26, 2024	1,014 (RV)	± 3.0%	50%	48%	2%
Institute for Global Affairs/YouGov	August 15–22, 2024	350 (A)	± 6.6%	43%	42%	15% (Note: "I am eligible to vote but would not" with 6%; "I am not eligible to vote" with 5%; "Other" with 4%)
Spry Strategies (R) (Note: Poll sponsored by the American Principles Project)	August 14–20, 2024	600 (LV)	± 4.0%	49%	49%	2%
Focaldata	August 6–16, 2024	651 (LV)	± 3.8%	48%	52%	–
The New York Times/Siena College	August 9–14, 2024	661 (RV)	± 4.4%	44%	51%	5%
The New York Times/Siena College	August 9–14, 2024	661 (LV)	± 4.4%	46%	50%	4%
Cook Political Report/BSG (R)/GS Strategy Group (D)	July 26 – August 8, 2024	405 (LV)	–	48%	48%	4%
Fabrizio Ward (R)/Impact Research (D) (Note: Poll commissioned by AARP)	July 24–31, 2024	600 (LV)	± 4.0%	48%	48%	4%
Trafalgar Group (R)/InsiderAdvantage (R)	July 29–30, 2024	– (LV)	± 3.5%	47%	49%	4%
Public Policy Polling (D) (Note: Poll conducted for Progress Action Fund, which supports Democratic candidates)	July 29–30, 2024	662 (RV)	± 3.8%	48%	47%	5%
Bloomberg/Morning Consult	July 24–28, 2024	799 (RV)	± 3.0%	47%	47%	5%
SoCal Strategies (R) (Note: Poll sponsored by On Point Politics)	July 25–26, 2024	505 (RV)	± 4.4%	46%	50%	4%
Emerson College	July 22–23, 2024	800 (RV)	± 3.4%	46%	48%	6%
Emerson College	July 22–23, 2024	800 (RV)	± 3.4%	49%	51%	–
Landmark Communications	July 22, 2024	400 (LV)	± 5.0%	47%	48%	5%
	July 21, 2024	Kamala Harris declares her candidacy.				
University of Georgia School of Public and International Affairs (Note: Poll sponsored by The Atlanta Journal-Constitution)	July 9–18, 2024	1,000 (LV)	± 3.1%	46%	51%	3%
InsiderAdvantage (R) (Note: Poll conducted for WAGA-TV)	July 15–16, 2024	800 (LV)	± 4.1%	37%	47%	16%
Mainstreet Research/Florida Atlantic University	July 12–15, 2024	640 (RV)	± 3.6%	42%	46%	12%
Mainstreet Research/Florida Atlantic University	July 12–15, 2024	549 (LV)	± 3.6%	43%	49%	8%
Bloomberg/Morning Consult	May 7–13, 2024	795 (RV)	± 3.0%	41%	49%	10%
Emerson College	February 14–16, 2024	1,000 (RV)	± 3.0%	41%	51%	8%
The New York Times/Siena College	October 22 – November 3, 2023	629 (RV)	± 4.5%	44%	45%	11%
The New York Times/Siena College	October 22 – November 3, 2023	629 (LV)	± 4.5%	44%	47%	9%

Kamala Harris vs. Donald Trump vs. Cornel West vs. Jill Stein vs. Chase Oliver

Aggregate polls

Source of poll aggregation	Dates administered	Dates updated	Kamala Harris Democratic	Donald Trump Republican	Jill Stein Green	Cornel West Independent	Chase Oliver Libertarian	Other/ Undecided	Margin
Race to the WH	through October 22, 2024	October 22, 2024	47.4%	48.7%	0.8%	—N/a	0.9%	2.2%	Trump +1.3%
270ToWin	October 16–22, 2024	October 22, 2024	45.8%	49.2%	0.6%	0.0%	0.6%	3.8%	Trump +3.4%
Average			46.6%	49.0%	0.7%	0.0%	0.8%	2.9%	Trump +2.4%

Poll source	Date(s) administered	Sample size	Margin of error	Kamala Harris Democratic	Donald Trump Republican	Cornel West Independent	Jill Stein Green	Chase Oliver Libertarian	Other / Undecided
HarrisX	November 3–5, 2024	1,880 (RV)	± 2.3%	45%	47%	1%	1%	–	6%
HarrisX	November 3–5, 2024	1,880 (RV)	± 2.3%	48%	49%	2%	1%	–	–
HarrisX	November 3–5, 2024	1,659 (LV)	± 2.3%	47%	48%	1%	1%	–	3%
HarrisX	November 3–5, 2024	1,659 (LV)	± 2.3%	48%	50%	1%	1%	–	–
AtlasIntel	November 3–4, 2024	1,112 (LV)	± 3.0%	48%	48%	–	1%	1%	2%
AtlasIntel	November 1–2, 2024	1,174 (LV)	± 3.0%	47%	49%	–	2%	1%	1%
The New York Times/Siena College	October 24 – November 2, 2024	1,004 (RV)	± 3.5%	44%	43%	2%	0%	3%	8%
The New York Times/Siena College	October 24 – November 2, 2024	1,004 (LV)	± 3.5%	46%	46%	0%	0%	2%	6%
Focaldata	October 3 – November 1, 2024	1,850 (LV)	–	48%	49%	–	1%	1%	1%
Focaldata	October 3 – November 1, 2024	1,627 (RV)	± 2.3%	50%	47%	–	1%	1%	1%
Focaldata	October 3 – November 1, 2024	1,850 (A)	–	49%	47%	–	1%	2%	1%
AtlasIntel	October 30–31, 2024	1,212 (LV)	± 3.0%	47%	49%	–	2%	1%	1%
East Carolina University	October 28–31, 2024	902 (LV)	± 3.0%	49%	50%	–	0%	1%	–
Redfield & Wilton Strategies	October 28–31, 2024	1,779 (LV)	–	47%	48%	–	0%	1%	4%
Data for Progress (D)	October 25–31, 2024	792 (LV)	± 3.0%	49%	48%	0%	0%	1%	2%
YouGov	October 25–31, 2024	984 (RV)	± 3.9%	46%	48%	1%	1%	–	4%
YouGov	October 25–31, 2024	939 (LV)	± 3.9%	47%	48%	0%	0%	–	5%
AtlasIntel	October 25–29, 2024	1,429 (LV)	± 3.0%	47%	50%	–	1%	1%	1%
CNN/SSRS	October 23–28, 2024	732 (LV)	± 4.7%	47%	48%	–	1%	1%	3%
Redfield & Wilton Strategies	October 25–27, 2024	1,112 (LV)	–	47%	48%	–	0%	1%	4%
The Citadel	October 17–25, 2024	1,218 (RV)	± 3.8%	47%	48%	1%	1%	0%	3%
The Citadel	October 17–25, 2024	1,126 (LV)	± 3.8%	47%	49%	0%	1%	0%	3%
Redfield & Wilton Strategies	October 20–22, 2024	1,168 (LV)	–	47%	48%	–	0%	1%	4%
Bloomberg/Morning Consult	October 16–20, 2024	914 (RV)	± 3.0%	48%	47%	–	0%	2%	3%
Bloomberg/Morning Consult	October 16–20, 2024	855 (LV)	± 3.0%	48%	49%	–	0%	1%	2%
University of Georgia School of Public and International Affairs	October 7–16, 2024	1,000 (LV)	± 3.1%	43%	47%	–	0%	0%	10% (Note: "Other candidate" with 1%)
Redfield & Wilton Strategies	October 16–18, 2024	1,019 (LV)	–	47%	48%	–	1%	1%	3%
AtlasIntel	October 12–17, 2024	1,411 (LV)	± 3.0%	48%	50%	0%	0%	1%	1%
Redfield & Wilton Strategies	October 12–14, 2024	637 (LV)	–	47%	47%	–	2%	1%	3%
Quinnipiac University	October 10–14, 2024	1,328 (LV)	± 2.7%	45%	52%	–	1%	1%	1%
East Carolina University	October 9–14, 2024	701 (LV)	± 4.0%	46%	49%	–	1%	0%	4%
Redfield & Wilton Strategies	October 8–9, 2024	608 (LV)	–	47%	48%	–	1%	1%	3%
Redfield & Wilton Strategies	September 27 – October 2, 2024	3,783 (LV)	–	47%	47%	–	1%	1%	4%
Quinnipiac University	September 25–29, 2024	942 (LV)	± 3.2%	44%	50%	1%	0%	1%	4% (Note: Claudia De la Cruz (PSL) with 1%)
AtlasIntel	September 20–25, 2024	1,200 (LV)	± 3.0%	49%	49%	0%	–	0%	2%
Cook Political Report/BSG (R)/GS Strategy Group (D)	September 19–25, 2024	411 (LV)	–	47%	48%	–	0%	–	5%
Bloomberg/Morning Consult	September 19–25, 2024	989 (RV)	± 3.0%	48%	47%	–	0%	3%	2%
Bloomberg/Morning Consult	September 19–25, 2024	913 (LV)	± 3.0%	48%	48%	–	0%	2%	2%
Fox News	September 20−24, 2024	1,006 (RV)	± 3.0%	49%	47%	1%	1%	1%	1%
Fox News	September 20−24, 2024	707 (LV)	± 3.5%	50%	48%	1%	1%	1%	−
The New York Times/Siena College	September 17–21, 2024	682 (RV)	± 4.6%	43%	46%	–	2%	2%	7%
The New York Times/Siena College	September 17–21, 2024	682 (LV)	± 4.6%	44%	47%	–	1%	2%	6%
Redfield & Wilton Strategies	September 16–19, 2024	1,043 (LV)	–	46%	48%	–	1%	1%	4%
TIPP Insights	September 16–18, 2024	1,046 (RV)	± 3.5%	46%	44%	2%	1%	–	7%
TIPP Insights	September 16–18, 2024	835 (LV)	± 3.5%	48%	48%	1%	1%	–	2%
University of Georgia School of Public and International Affairs	September 9–15, 2024	1,000 (LV)	± 3.1%	44%	47%	1%	0%	0%	7% (Note: Claudia De la Cruz (PSL) with 0%)
Redfield & Wilton Strategies	September 6–9, 2024	562 (LV)	–	47%	49%	–	1%	0%	3%
Quinnipiac University	September 4–8, 2024	969 (LV)	± 3.2%	45%	49%	1%	0%	0%	6%
YouGov	August 23 – September 3, 2024	1,000 (RV)	± 3.8%	45%	47%	0%	0%	–	8%
CNN/SSRS	August 23–29, 2024	617 (LV)	± 4.7%	48%	47%	1%	1%	1%	2%
Redfield & Wilton Strategies	August 25–28, 2024	699 (LV)	–	42%	44%	–	1%	0%	13%
Bloomberg/Morning Consult	August 23–26, 2024	737 (LV)	± 4.0%	48%	46%	–	1%	3%	2%
Bloomberg/Morning Consult	August 23–26, 2024	801 (RV)	± 3.0%	47%	46%	–	1%	4%	2%
Fox News	August 23–26, 2024	1,014 (RV)	± 3.0%	48%	46%	1%	2%	2%	1%

Hypothetical polling with Robert F. Kennedy Jr.

Kamala Harris vs. Donald Trump vs. Robert F. Kennedy Jr. vs. Cornel West vs. Jill Stein vs. Chase Oliver

Poll source	Date(s) administered	Sample size	Margin of error	Kamala Harris Democratic	Donald Trump Republican	Robert Kennedy Jr Independent	Cornel West Independent	Jill Stein Green	Chase Oliver Libertarian	Other / Undecided
The Wall Street Journal	September 28 – October 8, 2024	600 (RV)	± 5.0%	46%	45%	0%	0%	2%	0%	7%
Global Strategy Group (D)/North Star Opinion Research (R)	September 23–29, 2024	400 (LV)	± 4.9%	46%	47%	2%	0%	1%	0%	4%
	August 23, 2024	Robert F. Kennedy Jr. suspends his presidential campaign and endorses Donald Trump.								
Spry Strategies (R)	August 14–20, 2024	600 (LV)	± 4.0%	47%	48%	2%	–	1%	–	2%
Focaldata	August 6–16, 2024	651 (LV)	± 3.8%	45%	49%	2%	–	0%	0%	4%
Focaldata	August 6–16, 2024	651 (RV)	± 3.8%	46%	47%	3%	–	0%	0%	4%
Focaldata	August 6–16, 2024	651 (A)	± 3.8%	46%	47%	3%	–	0%	0%	4%
Redfield & Wilton Strategies	August 12–15, 2024	692 (LV)	–	46%	46%	2%	–	0%	0%	6%
The New York Times/Siena College	August 9–14, 2024	661 (RV)	± 4.4%	41%	47%	5%	0%	1%	2%	5%
The New York Times/Siena College	August 9–14, 2024	661 (LV)	± 4.4%	44%	47%	4%	0%	1%	1%	3%
Cook Political Report/BSG (R)/GS Strategy Group (D)	July 26 – August 8, 2024	405 (LV)	–	46%	46%	4%	1%	1%	–	2%
Redfield & Wilton Strategies	July 31 – August 3, 2024	1,128 (LV)	–	44%	46%	3%	–	1%	0%	6%
Fabrizio Ward (R)/Impact Research (D)	July 24–31, 2024	600 (LV)	± 4.0%	44%	46%	4%	2%	1%	0%	3%
Bloomberg/Morning Consult	July 24–28, 2024	799 (RV)	± 3.0%	45%	45%	4%	–	0%	4%	2%
Redfield & Wilton Strategies	July 22–24, 2024	1,180 (LV)	–	42%	47%	3%	–	1%	0%	7%
Emerson College	July 22–23, 2024	800 (RV)	± 3.4%	43%	46%	4%	1%	1%	0%	5%
Landmark Communications	July 22, 2024	400 (LV)	± 5.0%	44%	46%	4%	1%	0%	0%	5%

Kamala Harris vs. Donald Trump vs. Robert F. Kennedy Jr.

Poll source	Date(s) administered	Sample size	Margin of error	Kamala Harris Democratic	Donald Trump Republican	Robert Kennedy Jr Independent	Other / Undecided
	August 23, 2024	Robert F. Kennedy Jr. suspends his presidential campaign and endorses Donald Trump.					
Mainstreet Research/Florida Atlantic University	July 12–15, 2024	640 (RV)	± 3.6%	37%	46%	8%	9%
Mainstreet Research/Florida Atlantic University	July 12–15, 2024	549 (LV)	± 3.6%	38%	49%	6%	7%

Hypothetical polling with Joe Biden and Donald Trump

Joe Biden vs. Donald Trump

Poll source	Date(s) administered	Sample size	Margin of error	Joe Biden Democratic	Donald Trump Republican	Other / Undecided
	July 21, 2024	Joe Biden withdraws from the race.				
University of Georgia School of Public and International Affairs	July 9–18, 2024	1,000 (LV)	± 3.1%	45%	48%	7%
Emerson College (Note: Poll sponsored by Democrats for the Next Generation PAC)	July 15–16, 2024	1,000 (RV)	± 3.0%	41%	47%	12%
InsiderAdvantage (R)	July 15–16, 2024	800 (LV)	± 4.1%	44%	47%	9%
Mainstreet Research/Florida Atlantic University	July 12–15, 2024	981 (LV)	± 3.9%	43%	49%	8%
Rasmussen Reports (R) (Note: Poll sponsored by The Heartland Institute)	July 5–12, 2024	1,015 (LV)	± 3.0%	43%	48%	9%
Echelon Insights (Note: Poll sponsored by NetChoice)	July 1–8, 2024	608 (LV)	± 4.9%	45%	49%	6%
Bloomberg/Morning Consult	July 1–5, 2024	790 (RV)	± 3.0%	46%	47%	7%
Emerson College	June 30 – July 2, 2024	1,000 (RV)	± 3.0%	42%	47%	11%
Emerson College	June 13–18, 2024	1,000 (RV)	± 3.0%	41%	45%	14%
Emerson College	June 13–18, 2024	1,000 (RV)	± 3.0%	48%	52%	–
Quinnipiac University	May 30 – June 3, 2024	1,203 (RV)	± 2.8%	44%	49%	7%
Prime Group (Note: Poll sponsored by Citizens to Save Our Republic PAC, which opposes Trump and third-party candidates)	May 9–16, 2024	470 (RV)	–	49%	51%	–
Bloomberg/Morning Consult	May 7–13, 2024	795 (RV)	± 3.0%	44%	47%	9%
Cook Political Report/BSG (R)/GS Strategy Group (D)	May 6–13, 2024	600 (LV)	± 4.0%	44%	47%	9%
The New York Times/Siena College	April 28 – May 9, 2024	604 (RV)	± 4.6%	39%	49%	12%
The New York Times/Siena College	April 28 – May 9, 2024	604 (LV)	± 4.6%	41%	50%	9%
North Star Opinion Research (R) (Note: Poll sponsored by League of American Workers)	May 1–5, 2024	600 (LV)	± 4.0%	39%	49%	12%
Emerson College	April 25–29, 2024	1,000 (RV)	± 3.0%	44%	47%	9%
Emerson College	April 25–29, 2024	1,000 (RV)	± 3.0%	49%	51%	–
John Zogby Strategies (Note: Poll conducted for Kennedy's campaign)	April 13–21, 2024	635 (LV)	–	44%	47%	9%
Fox News	April 11–16, 2024	1,128 (RV)	± 3.0%	45%	51%	4%
Bloomberg/Morning Consult	April 8–15, 2024	802 (RV)	± 3.0%	43%	49%	8%
The Wall Street Journal	March 17–24, 2024	600 (RV)	± 4.0%	43%	44%	13%
Echelon Insights (Note: Poll sponsored by The Heritage Foundation)	March 12–19, 2024	400 (LV)	± 5.7%	42%	52%	6%
Marist College	March 11–14, 2024	1,177 (RV)	± 3.7%	47%	51%	2%
Bloomberg/Morning Consult	March 8–12, 2024	788 (RV)	± 3.0%	42%	49%	9%
CBS News/YouGov	March 4–11, 2024	1,133 (RV)	± 3.9%	48%	51%	1%
Emerson College	March 5–7, 2024	1,000 (RV)	± 3.0%	42%	46%	12%
Emerson College	March 5–7, 2024	1,000 (RV)	± 3.0%	48%	52%	–
Bloomberg/Morning Consult	February 12–20, 2024	800 (RV)	± 3.0%	43%	49%	8%
Emerson College	February 14–16, 2024	1,000 (RV)	± 3.0%	42%	48%	10%
Fox News	January 26–30, 2024	1,119 (RV)	± 3.0%	43%	51%	6%
Focaldata	January 17–23, 2024	887 (A)	–	36%	45%	19% (Note: "Another candidate" with 10%)
Focaldata	January 17–23, 2024	– (LV)	–	39%	47%	14% (Note: "Another candidate" with 8%)
Focaldata	January 17–23, 2024	– (LV)	–	48%	52%	–
Bloomberg/Morning Consult	January 16–21, 2024	798 (RV)	± 3.0%	41%	49%	10%
Atlanta Journal-Constitution	January 3–11, 2024	1,007 (RV)	± 3.1%	37%	45%	18%
CNN/SSRS	November 30 – December 7, 2023	1,068 (RV)	± 3.3%	44%	49%	7%
Bloomberg/Morning Consult	November 27 – December 6, 2023	801 (RV)	± 3.0%	43%	49%	8%
J.L. Partners (Note: Poll conducted for The Daily Mail)	November 27 – December 1, 2023	550 (LV)	± 4.2%	44%	46%	10%
Bloomberg/Morning Consult	October 30 – November 7, 2023	803 (RV)	± 3.0%	41%	48%	11%
Emerson College	October 30 – November 4, 2023	1,000 (RV)	± 3.0%	40%	47%	14%
University of Georgia School of Public and International Affairs	October 30 – November 3, 2023	1,002 (LV)	± 3.1%	44%	45%	11%
The New York Times/Siena College	October 22 – November 3, 2023	629 (RV)	± 4.5%	43%	49%	8%
The New York Times/Siena College	October 22 – November 3, 2023	629 (LV)	± 4.5%	44%	49%	7%
Zogby Analytics	October 9–12, 2023	628 (LV)	± 3.9%	49%	51%	–
Bloomberg/Morning Consult	October 5–10, 2023	801 (RV)	± 3.0%	43%	48%	9%
Redfield & Wilton Strategies	October 7–9, 2023	761 (LV)	–	40%	43%	17%
Rasmussen Reports (R)	September 8–11, 2023	1,061 (LV)	± 3.0%	38%	47%	15%
Prime Group	June 14–28, 2023	500 (RV)	–	48%	52%	–
Prime Group	June 14–28, 2023	500 (RV)	–	36%	45%	19% (Note: No Labels candidate)
Cygnal (R) (Note: Poll sponsored by Hardworking Americans PAC)	June 5–7, 2023	600 (LV)	± 4%	41%	42%	17%
Public Opinion Strategies (R) (Note: Poll conducted for the Citizen Awareness Project)	May 15–17, 2023	500 (RV)	± 4.4%	44%	43%	13%
Public Opinion Strategies (R)	April 25–27, 2023	500 (RV)	± 4.4%	44%	43%	13%
Emerson College	November 28–30, 2022	888 (LV)	± 3.2%	44%	43%	13%
University of Massachusetts Lowell	November 18–28, 2022	1,300 (LV)	± 3.2%	47%	43%	7%
Targoz Market Research	November 2–6, 2022	579 (LV)	± 4.0%	43%	52%	5%
Emerson College	October 28–31, 2022	1,000 (LV)	± 3.0%	44%	47%	9%
Rasmussen Reports (R)	October 23–24, 2022	1,053 (LV)	± 3.0%	39%	47%	14%
Emerson College	October 6–7, 2022	1,000 (LV)	± 3.0%	43%	45%	12%
Echelon Insights	August 31 – September 7, 2022	751 (LV)	± 4.4%	47%	45%	8%
Emerson College	August 28–29, 2022	600 (LV)	± 3.9%	46%	51%	3%
PEM Management Corporation (R) (Note: Poll conducted for the John Bolton Super PAC)	July 22–24, 2022	300 (LV)	± 5.7%	40%	48%	12%
East Carolina University	June 6–9, 2022	868 (RV)	± 3.9%	40%	47%	13%
Blueprint Polling (D)	March 2–8, 2022	662 (V)	± 3.9%	36%	50%	14%
Fabrizio, Lee & Associates (R)	November 11–16, 2021	600 (LV)	± 4.0%	45%	48%	7%

Joe Biden vs. Donald Trump vs. Robert F. Kennedy Jr. vs. Cornel West vs. Jill Stein

Poll source	Date(s) administered	Sample size	Margin of error	Joe Biden Democratic	Donald Trump Republican	Robert Kennedy Jr Independent	Cornel West Independent	Jill Stein Green	Other / Undecided
	July 21, 2024	Joe Biden withdraws from the race.							
Redfield & Wilton Strategies	July 16–18, 2024	618 (LV)	–	40%	45%	5%	–	0%	10% (Note: Chase Oliver (L) with 0%)
Emerson College	July 15–16, 2024	1,000 (RV)	± 3.0%	39%	44%	6%	2%	1%	8%
Rasmussen Reports (R)	July 5–12, 2024	1,015 (LV)	± 3.0%	39%	44%	10%	1%	0%	6%
YouGov	July 4–12, 2024	1,000 (RV)	± 3.6%	40%	44%	5%	1%	1%	14%
Redfield & Wilton Strategies	July 8–10, 2024	433 (LV)	–	40%	46%	6%	–	1%	7%
Echelon Insights	July 1–8, 2024	608 (LV)	± 4.9%	39%	45%	7%	2%	2%	5% (Note: Chase Oliver (L) with 1%)
Bloomberg/Morning Consult	July 1–5, 2024	790 (RV)	± 3.0%	42%	44%	7%	1%	0%	6%
Emerson College	June 13–18, 2024	1,000 (RV)	± 3.0%	37%	45%	6%	1%	1%	10%
Redfield & Wilton Strategies	June 8–11, 2024	471 (LV)	–	39%	44%	6%	–	0%	11%
Quinnipiac University	May 30 – June 3, 2024	1,203 (RV)	± 2.8%	37%	43%	8%	3%	2%	7% (Note: Chase Oliver (L) with 3%)
Prime Group	May 9–16, 2024	470 (RV)	–	41%	42%	11%	5%	1%	–
Bloomberg/Morning Consult	May 7–13, 2024	795 (RV)	± 3.0%	39%	44%	8%	1%	1%	7%
Cook Political Report/BSG (R)/GS Strategy Group (D)	May 6–13, 2024	600 (LV)	± 4.0%	38%	42%	10%	2%	1%	7%
The New York Times/Siena College	April 28 – May 9, 2024	604 (RV)	± 4.6%	31%	39%	9%	0%	1%	20% (Note: Lars Mapstead (L) with 1%)
The New York Times/Siena College	April 28 – May 9, 2024	604 (LV)	± 4.6%	34%	42%	8%	0%	0%	16% (Note: Lars Mapstead (L) with 2%)
Emerson College	April 25–29, 2024	1,000 (RV)	± 3.0%	39%	45%	5%	2%	2%	8%
Fox News	April 11–16, 2024	1,128 (RV)	± 3.0%	39%	46%	7%	1%	2%	5%
Bloomberg/Morning Consult	April 8–15, 2024	802 (RV)	± 3.0%	40%	45%	7%	1%	1%	6%
The Wall Street Journal	March 17–24, 2024	600 (RV)	± 4.0%	35%	38%	8%	2%	1%	16%
Emerson College	March 5–7, 2024	1,000 (RV)	± 3.0%	37%	44%	5%	2%	1%	11%
Bloomberg/Morning Consult	March 8–12, 2024	788 (RV)	± 3.0%	38%	45%	7%	2%	0%	8%
Bloomberg/Morning Consult	February 12–20, 2024	800 (RV)	± 3.0%	38%	45%	6%	1%	1%	9%
Emerson College	February 14–16, 2024	1,000 (RV)	± 3.0%	36%	45%	6%	1%	1%	11%
Fox News	January 26–30, 2024	1,119 (RV)	± 3.0%	37%	45%	8%	3%	1%	6%
Bloomberg/Morning Consult	January 16–21, 2024	798 (RV)	± 3.0%	37%	44%	8%	1%	1%	11%
Bloomberg/Morning Consult	November 27 – December 6, 2023	801 (RV)	± 3.0%	37%	44%	6%	2%	1%	10%
J.L. Partners	November 27 – December 1, 2023	550 (LV)	± 4.2%	41%	45%	2%	1%	0%	10% (Note: "Someone else" with 10%)

Joe Biden vs. Donald Trump vs. Robert F. Kennedy Jr.

Poll source	Date(s) administered	Sample size	Margin of error	Joe Biden Democratic	Donald Trump Republican	Robert Kennedy Jr Independent	Other / Undecided
	July 21, 2024	Joe Biden withdraws from the race.					
P2 Insights (Note: Poll sponsored by Building America's Future, which supports Republican candidates)	June 11–20, 2024	650 (LV)	± 3.8%	35%	45%	6%	14%
University of Georgia School of Public and International Affairs	June 11–20, 2024	1,000 (LV)	± 3.1%	38%	43%	9%	10%
P2 Insights	May 13−21, 2024	650 (LV)	± 3.8%	39%	43%	7%	11%
North Star Opinion Research (R)	May 1–5, 2024	600 (LV)	± 4.0%	33%	41%	13%	13%
Redfield & Wilton Strategies	May 2–4, 2024	610 (LV)	–	38%	43%	5%	14%
Redfield & Wilton Strategies	March 14–17, 2024	760 (LV)	–	41%	44%	6%	9%
Marist College	March 11–14, 2024	1,177 (RV)	± 3.7%	40%	45%	14%	1%
Redfield & Wilton Strategies	December 28–30, 2023	953 (LV)	–	34%	42%	8%	16%
Redfield & Wilton Strategies	November 27–29, 2023	746 (LV)	–	35%	45%	7%	14%
The New York Times/Siena College	October 22 – November 3, 2023	629 (RV)	± 4.5%	29%	36%	24%	1%
The New York Times/Siena College	October 22 – November 3, 2023	629 (LV)	± 4.5%	31%	38%	23%	8%
Redfield & Wilton Strategies	October 7–9, 2023	761 (LV)	–	38%	41%	8%	13%

Joe Biden vs. Donald Trump vs. Robert F. Kennedy Jr. vs. Cornel West

Poll source	Date(s) administered	Sample size	Margin of error	Joe Biden Democratic	Donald Trump Republican	Robert Kennedy Jr Independent	Cornel West Independent	Other / Undecided
	July 21, 2024	Joe Biden withdraws from the race.						
CNN/SSRS	November 30 – December 7, 2023	1068 (RV)	± 3.3%	34%	42%	15%	6%	4%
Bloomberg/Morning Consult	October 30 – November 7, 2023	803 (RV)	± 3.0%	34%	43%	10%	1%	12%
Zogby Analytics	October 9–12, 2023	628 (LV)	± 3.9%	36%	44%	15%	5%	–

Hypothetical polling with other candidates

Joe Biden vs. Robert F. Kennedy Jr.

Poll source	Date(s) administered	Sample size	Margin of error	Joe Biden Democratic	Robert Kennedy Jr. Independent	Other / Undecided
John Zogby Strategies	April 13–21, 2024	635 (LV)	–	41%	45%	14%

Robert F. Kennedy Jr. vs. Donald Trump

Poll source	Date(s) administered	Sample size	Margin of error	Robert Kennedy Jr. Independent	Donald Trump Republican	Other / Undecided
John Zogby Strategies	April 13–21, 2024	635 (LV)	–	43%	43%	14%

Joe Biden vs. Nikki Haley

Poll source	Date(s) administered	Sample size	Margin of error	Joe Biden Democratic	Nikki Haley Republican	Other / Undecided
CNN/SSRS	November 30 – December 7, 2023	1,068 (RV)	± 3.3%	43%	49%	8%
University of Georgia School of Public and International Affairs	October 30 – November 3, 2023	1,002 (LV)	± 3.1%	41%	43%	16%
The New York Times/Siena College	October 22 – November 3, 2023	629 (RV)	± 4.5%	40%	43%	17%
The New York Times/Siena College	October 22 – November 3, 2023	629 (LV)	± 4.5%	40%	45%	15%

Joe Biden vs. Nikki Haley vs. Robert F. Kennedy Jr.

Poll source	Date(s) administered	Sample size	Margin of error	Joe Biden Democratic	Nikki Haley Republican	Robert Kennedy Jr Independent	Other	Undecided
Redfield & Wilton Strategies	November 27–29, 2023	746 (LV)	–	35%	27%	17%	5%	15%

Joe Biden vs. Ron DeSantis

Poll source	Date(s) administered	Sample size	Margin of error	Joe Biden Democratic	Ron DeSantis Republican	Other / Undecided
CNN/SSRS	November 30 – December 7, 2023	1,068 (RV)	± 3.3%	48%	45%	7%
University of Georgia School of Public and International Affairs	October 30 – November 3, 2023	1,002 (LV)	± 3.1%	43%	42%	15%
The New York Times/Siena College	October 22 – November 3, 2023	629 (RV)	± 4.5%	43%	43%	14%
The New York Times/Siena College	October 22 – November 3, 2023	629 (LV)	± 4.5%	44%	45%	11%
Public Opinion Strategies (R)	May 15–17, 2023	500 (RV)	± 4.4%	42%	45%	–
Public Opinion Strategies (R)	April 25–27, 2023	500 (RV)	± 4.4%	42%	47%	11%
Emerson College	November 28–30, 2022	888 (LV)	± 3.2%	43%	47%	10%
University of Massachusetts Lowell	November 18–28, 2022	1,300 (LV)	± 3.2%	46%	47%	7%
Echelon Insights	August 31 – September 7, 2022	751 (LV)	± 4.4%	47%	42%	11%

Joe Biden vs. Ron DeSantis vs. Robert F. Kennedy Jr.

Poll source	Date(s) administered	Sample size	Margin of error	Joe Biden Democratic	Ron DeSantis Republican	Robert Kennedy Jr Independent	Other	Undecided
Redfield & Wilton Strategies	November 27–29, 2023	746 (LV)	–	36%	34%	14%	4%	12%

Joe Biden vs. Mike Pence

Poll source	Date(s) administered	Sample size	Margin of error	Joe Biden Democratic	Mike Pence Republican	Other / Undecided
Public Opinion Strategies (R)	May 15–17, 2023	500 (RV)	± 4.4%	44%	43%	–

Joe Biden vs. generic Republican

Poll source	Date(s) administered	Sample size	Margin of error	Joe Biden Democratic	Generic Republican	Undecided
Cygnal (R)	June 5–7, 2023	600 (LV)	± 4%	38%	48%	14%

Gavin Newsom vs. Donald Trump

Poll source	Date(s) administered	Sample size	Margin of error	Gavin Newsom Democratic	Donald Trump Republican	Other / Undecided
Emerson College	February 14–16, 2024	1,000 (RV)	± 3.0%	32%	51%	17%

=== Results ===
State House district results: Trump 50–60% 60–70% 70–80% 80–90% / Harris 40–50% 50–60% 60–70% 70–80% 80–90% 90–100%

State Senate district results

2024 United States presidential election in Georgia
Party	Candidate	Votes	%	±%
Republican	Donald Trump; JD Vance	2,663,117	50.73%	+1.48%
Democratic	Kamala Harris; Tim Walz	2,548,017	48.53%	−0.94%
Libertarian	Chase Oliver; Mike ter Maat	20,684	0.39%	−0.85%
Green	Jill Stein; Butch Ware	18,229	0.35%	+0.33%
Write-in		858	0.02%	-0.02%
Total votes		5,250,905	100.00%	N/A

Two additional candidates, Party for Socialism and Liberation nominee Claudia De la Cruz and independent Cornel West, were disqualified by the Georgia Supreme Court after ballots were printed. Their names remained on the ballot, but votes for them did not count.

==== By county ====
County	Donald Trump Republican		Kamala Harris Democratic		Various candidates Other parties		Margin		Total
County	#	%	#	%	#	%	#	%	Total
Appling	6,761	81.13%	1,560	18.72%	13	0.15%	5,201	62.41%	8,334
Atkinson	2,350	76.87%	700	22.90%	7	0.23%	1,650	53.97%	3,057
Bacon	4,186	86.51%	645	13.33%	8	0.16%	3,541	73.18%	4,839
Baker	883	59.82%	590	39.97%	3	0.21%	293	19.85%	1,476
Baldwin	9,574	50.86%	9,159	48.65%	92	0.49%	415	2.21%	18,825
Banks	9,358	88.96%	1,136	10.80%	25	0.24%	8,222	78.16%	10,519
Barrow	30,730	69.95%	12,949	29.47%	255	0.58%	17,781	40.48%	43,934
Bartow	43,271	75.19%	13,942	24.23%	334	0.58%	29,329	50.96%	57,547
Ben Hill	4,281	65.85%	2,199	33.83%	21	0.32%	2,082	32.02%	6,501
Berrien	6,841	84.79%	1,209	14.99%	18	0.22%	5,632	69.80%	8,068
Bibb	26,658	38.53%	42,172	60.96%	351	0.51%	−15,514	−22.43%	69,181
Bleckley	4,685	77.51%	1,339	22.15%	20	0.34%	3,346	55.36%	6,044
Brantley	7,744	91.11%	736	8.66%	20	0.23%	7,008	82.45%	8,500
Brooks	4,560	63.25%	2,629	36.46%	21	0.29%	1,931	26.79%	7,210
Bryan	16,738	67.90%	7,779	31.56%	134	0.54%	8,959	36.34%	24,651
Bulloch	20,985	64.26%	11,514	35.26%	158	0.48%	9,471	29.00%	32,657
Burke	6,027	54.44%	4,994	45.11%	49	0.45%	1,033	9.33%	11,070
Butts	9,424	72.39%	3,544	27.22%	51	0.39%	5,880	45.17%	13,019
Calhoun	900	43.77%	1,153	56.08%	3	0.15%	−253	−12.31%	2,056
Camden	17,819	67.51%	8,405	31.85%	169	0.64%	9,414	35.66%	26,393
Candler	3,366	73.69%	1,196	26.18%	6	0.13%	2,170	47.51%	4,568
Carroll	42,536	70.31%	17,634	29.15%	324	0.54%	24,902	41.16%	60,494
Catoosa	27,150	77.49%	7,704	21.99%	184	0.52%	19,446	55.50%	35,038
Charlton	3,607	77.94%	1,007	21.76%	14	0.30%	2,600	56.18%	4,628
Chatham	57,336	40.63%	82,758	58.65%	1,015	0.72%	−25,422	−18.02%	141,109
Chattahoochee	982	57.97%	703	41.50%	9	0.53%	279	16.47%	1,694
Chattooga	8,769	81.91%	1,896	17.71%	41	0.38%	6,873	64.20%	10,706
Cherokee	112,142	69.10%	48,838	30.09%	1,301	0.81%	63,304	39.01%	162,281
Clarke	16,049	30.35%	36,297	68.63%	541	1.02%	−20,248	−38.28%	52,887
Clay	663	45.98%	771	53.47%	8	0.55%	−108	−7.49%	1,442
Clayton	16,877	15.11%	94,203	84.31%	649	0.58%	−77,326	−69.20%	111,729
Clinch	2,201	75.69%	702	24.14%	5	0.17%	1,499	51.55%	2,908
Cobb	168,679	42.03%	228,404	56.91%	4,286	1.06%	−59,725	−14.88%	401,369
Coffee	11,388	72.47%	4,295	27.33%	32	0.20%	7,093	45.14%	15,715
Colquitt	12,451	74.96%	4,114	24.77%	46	0.27%	8,337	50.19%	16,611
Columbia	53,657	62.45%	31,624	36.81%	639	0.74%	22,033	25.64%	85,920
Cook	5,374	73.05%	1,956	26.59%	27	0.36%	3,418	46.46%	7,357
Coweta	57,204	66.58%	28,111	32.72%	601	0.70%	29,093	33.86%	85,916
Crawford	4,742	74.79%	1,582	24.95%	16	0.25%	3,160	49.84%	6,340
Crisp	5,099	62.83%	2,993	36.88%	24	0.29%	2,106	25.95%	8,116
Dade	6,804	82.98%	1,343	16.38%	53	0.64%	5,461	66.60%	8,200
Dawson	16,115	82.38%	3,350	17.13%	96	0.49%	12,765	65.25%	19,561
Decatur	7,140	61.82%	4,372	37.86%	37	0.32%	2,768	23.96%	11,549
DeKalb	62,622	17.11%	299,630	81.86%	3,756	1.03%	−237,008	−64.75%	366,008
Dodge	6,249	74.84%	2,081	24.92%	20	0.24%	4,168	49.92%	8,350
Dooly	2,243	53.70%	1,921	45.99%	13	0.31%	322	7.71%	4,177
Dougherty	9,904	29.26%	23,831	70.40%	115	0.34%	−13,927	−41.14%	33,850
Douglas	23,996	33.93%	46,240	65.38%	485	0.69%	−22,244	−31.45%	70,721
Early	2,718	55.71%	2,158	44.23%	3	0.06%	560	11.48%	4,879
Echols	1,307	90.89%	127	8.83%	4	0.28%	1,180	82.06%	1,438
Effingham	26,943	74.34%	9,144	25.23%	157	0.43%	17,799	49.11%	36,244
Elbert	6,860	71.54%	2,700	28.16%	29	0.30%	4,160	43.38%	9,589
Emanuel	6,919	71.93%	2,673	27.79%	27	0.28%	4,246	44.14%	9,619
Evans	3,011	70.95%	1,214	28.61%	19	0.44%	1,797	42.34%	4,244
Fannin	13,232	82.21%	2,807	17.44%	57	0.35%	10,425	64.77%	16,096
Fayette	38,177	51.15%	35,822	48.00%	634	0.85%	2,355	3.15%	74,633
Floyd	31,631	70.70%	12,862	28.75%	245	0.55%	18,769	41.95%	44,738
Forsyth	91,281	66.03%	45,509	32.92%	1,459	1.05%	45,772	33.11%	138,249
Franklin	10,459	86.15%	1,647	13.57%	34	0.28%	8,812	72.58%	12,140
Fulton	144,655	27.03%	384,752	71.88%	5,831	1.09%	−240,097	−44.85%	535,238
Gilmer	14,976	81.03%	3,413	18.47%	92	0.50%	11,563	62.56%	18,481
Glascock	1,534	91.86%	133	7.96%	3	0.18%	1,401	83.90%	1,670
Glynn	27,558	62.76%	16,144	36.76%	210	0.48%	11,414	26.00%	43,912
Gordon	22,495	81.49%	4,982	18.05%	129	0.46%	17,513	63.44%	27,606
Grady	7,385	68.90%	3,290	30.70%	43	0.40%	4,095	38.20%	10,718
Greene	8,215	64.25%	4,514	35.30%	57	0.45%	3,701	28.95%	12,786
Gwinnett	173,041	41.13%	242,507	57.65%	5,133	1.22%	−69,466	−16.52%	420,681
Habersham	19,142	82.23%	4,036	17.34%	102	0.43%	15,106	64.89%	23,280
Hall	72,991	71.58%	28,347	27.80%	635	0.62%	44,644	43.78%	101,973
Hancock	1,364	32.17%	2,864	67.55%	12	0.28%	−1,500	−35.38%	4,240
Haralson	14,239	87.01%	2,065	12.62%	60	0.37%	12,174	74.39%	16,364
Harris	16,283	72.84%	5,976	26.73%	94	0.43%	10,307	46.11%	22,353
Hart	11,064	77.20%	3,210	22.40%	57	0.40%	7,854	54.80%	14,331
Heard	5,335	85.91%	859	13.83%	16	0.26%	4,476	72.08%	6,210
Henry	44,982	34.86%	83,253	64.52%	799	0.62%	−38,271	−29.66%	129,034
Houston	45,090	55.32%	35,907	44.05%	517	0.63%	9,183	11.27%	81,514
Irwin	3,340	76.92%	986	22.71%	16	0.37%	2,354	54.21%	4,342
Jackson	36,497	77.25%	10,472	22.17%	274	0.58%	26,025	55.08%	47,243
Jasper	7,203	79.00%	1,881	20.63%	34	0.37%	5,322	58.37%	9,118
Jeff Davis	4,935	84.04%	924	15.74%	13	0.22%	4,011	68.30%	5,872
Jefferson	3,765	50.45%	3,674	49.23%	24	0.32%	91	1.22%	7,463
Jenkins	2,217	65.03%	1,179	34.58%	13	0.39%	1,038	30.45%	3,409
Johnson	2,913	73.12%	1,066	26.76%	5	0.12%	1,847	46.36%	3,984
Jones	11,079	68.85%	4,959	30.82%	54	0.33%	6,120	38.03%	16,092
Lamar	7,575	72.75%	2,797	26.86%	41	0.39%	4,778	45.89%	10,413
Lanier	2,726	72.97%	995	26.63%	15	0.40%	1,731	46.34%	3,736
Laurens	15,460	66.20%	7,820	33.49%	72	0.31%	7,640	32.71%	23,352
Lee	12,655	71.57%	4,957	28.03%	71	0.40%	7,698	43.54%	17,683
Liberty	9,441	41.00%	13,459	58.45%	128	0.55%	−4,018	−17.45%	23,028
Lincoln	3,559	72.18%	1,351	27.40%	21	0.42%	2,208	44.78%	4,931
Long	4,557	64.58%	2,476	35.09%	23	0.33%	2,081	29.49%	7,056
Lowndes	28,081	58.75%	19,487	40.77%	227	0.48%	8,594	17.98%	47,795
Lumpkin	14,339	80.52%	3,356	18.85%	113	0.63%	10,983	61.67%	17,808
Macon	1,916	40.89%	2,755	58.79%	15	0.32%	−839	−17.90%	4,686
Madison	12,951	77.15%	3,753	22.36%	83	0.49%	9,198	54.79%	16,787
Marion	2,348	64.84%	1,253	34.60%	20	0.55%	1,095	30.24%	3,621
McDuffie	6,562	62.28%	3,937	37.36%	38	0.36%	2,625	24.92%	10,537
McIntosh	4,747	64.08%	2,628	35.48%	33	0.44%	2,119	28.60%	7,408
Meriwether	7,375	62.56%	4,373	37.10%	40	0.34%	3,002	25.46%	11,788
Miller	2,045	75.07%	670	24.60%	9	0.33%	1,375	50.47%	2,724
Mitchell	5,150	58.02%	3,701	41.69%	26	0.29%	1,449	16.33%	8,877
Monroe	12,954	73.17%	4,689	26.49%	61	0.34%	8,265	46.68%	17,704
Montgomery	3,033	76.34%	927	23.33%	13	0.33%	2,106	53.01%	3,973
Morgan	9,589	72.75%	3,533	26.80%	59	0.45%	6,056	45.95%	13,181
Murray	14,965	85.67%	2,459	14.08%	44	0.25%	12,506	71.59%	17,468
Muscogee	30,616	38.04%	49,413	61.39%	462	0.57%	−18,797	−23.35%	80,491
Newton	24,893	42.16%	33,839	57.30%	319	0.54%	−8,946	−15.14%	59,051
Oconee	18,424	67.52%	8,620	31.59%	243	0.89%	9,804	35.93%	27,287
Oglethorpe	6,255	70.90%	2,515	28.51%	52	0.59%	3,740	42.39%	8,822
Paulding	58,769	61.73%	35,802	37.61%	625	0.66%	22,967	24.12%	95,196
Peach	7,104	52.80%	6,293	46.77%	57	0.43%	811	6.03%	13,454
Pickens	17,281	82.62%	3,522	16.84%	112	0.54%	13,759	65.78%	20,915
Pierce	8,655	88.67%	1,089	11.16%	17	0.17%	7,566	77.51%	9,761
Pike	10,864	86.57%	1,648	13.13%	37	0.30%	9,216	73.44%	12,549
Polk	15,352	80.08%	3,749	19.56%	70	0.36%	11,603	60.52%	19,171
Pulaski	3,036	70.02%	1,281	29.54%	19	0.44%	1,755	40.48%	4,336
Putnam	9,136	70.95%	3,696	28.70%	45	0.35%	5,440	42.25%	12,877
Quitman	656	57.54%	480	42.11%	4	0.35%	176	15.43%	1,140
Rabun	8,151	78.20%	2,222	21.32%	50	0.48%	5,929	56.88%	10,423
Randolph	1,373	45.92%	1,601	53.55%	16	0.53%	−228	−7.63%	2,990
Richmond	26,472	31.67%	56,657	67.79%	449	0.54%	−30,185	−36.12%	83,578
Rockdale	11,711	25.93%	33,165	73.44%	284	0.63%	−21,454	−47.51%	45,160
Schley	1,970	81.14%	453	18.66%	5	0.20%	1,517	62.48%	2,428
Screven	4,325	62.50%	2,581	37.30%	14	0.20%	1,744	25.20%	6,920
Seminole	2,811	70.15%	1,191	29.72%	5	0.13%	1,620	40.43%	4,007
Spalding	19,184	58.07%	13,679	41.40%	175	0.53%	5,505	16.67%	33,038
Stephens	10,632	81.17%	2,404	18.35%	63	0.48%	8,228	62.82%	13,099
Stewart	847	41.77%	1,177	58.04%	4	0.19%	−330	−16.27%	2,028
Sumter	5,869	48.71%	6,136	50.93%	44	0.36%	−267	−2.22%	12,049
Talbot	1,483	43.89%	1,888	55.87%	8	0.24%	−405	−11.98%	3,379
Taliaferro	375	42.42%	507	57.35%	2	0.23%	−132	−14.93%	884
Tattnall	6,515	76.54%	1,967	23.11%	30	0.35%	4,548	53.43%	8,512
Taylor	2,600	65.29%	1,366	34.30%	16	0.41%	1,234	30.99%	3,982
Telfair	2,930	69.53%	1,274	30.23%	10	0.24%	1,656	39.30%	4,214
Terrell	2,075	47.80%	2,253	51.90%	13	0.30%	−178	−4.10%	4,341
Thomas	13,670	61.91%	8,347	37.80%	63	0.29%	5,323	24.11%	22,080
Tift	11,496	67.67%	5,438	32.01%	55	0.32%	6,058	35.66%	16,989
Toombs	8,208	75.22%	2,674	24.51%	30	0.27%	5,534	50.71%	10,912
Towns	7,155	80.96%	1,649	18.66%	34	0.38%	5,506	62.30%	8,838
Treutlen	2,250	72.09%	864	27.68%	7	0.23%	1,386	44.41%	3,121
Troup	19,392	61.95%	11,757	37.56%	155	0.49%	7,635	24.39%	31,304
Turner	2,457	64.10%	1,365	35.61%	11	0.29%	1,092	28.49%	3,833
Twiggs	2,549	57.20%	1,895	42.53%	12	0.27%	654	14.67%	4,456
Union	14,477	80.97%	3,309	18.51%	94	0.52%	11,168	62.46%	17,880
Upson	9,528	69.74%	4,098	30.00%	36	0.26%	5,430	39.74%	13,662
Walker	25,462	79.36%	6,436	20.06%	188	0.58%	19,026	59.30%	32,086
Walton	42,407	72.64%	15,605	26.73%	364	0.63%	26,802	45.91%	58,376
Ware	10,279	71.42%	4,068	28.27%	45	0.31%	6,211	43.15%	14,392
Warren	1,232	47.53%	1,354	52.24%	6	0.23%	−122	−4.71%	2,592
Washington	4,824	50.82%	4,643	48.91%	26	0.27%	181	1.91%	9,493
Wayne	10,811	79.72%	2,708	19.97%	42	0.31%	8,103	59.75%	13,561
Webster	790	59.13%	544	40.72%	2	0.15%	246	18.41%	1,336
Wheeler	1,648	72.41%	622	27.33%	6	0.26%	1,026	45.08%	2,276
White	14,136	84.02%	2,609	15.51%	80	0.47%	11,527	68.51%	16,825
Whitfield	28,655	71.95%	10,953	27.50%	220	0.55%	17,702	44.45%	39,828
Wilcox	2,493	74.48%	847	25.31%	7	0.21%	1,646	49.17%	3,347
Wilkes	2,971	58.28%	2,112	41.43%	15	0.29%	859	16.85%	5,098
Wilkinson	2,888	58.84%	2,012	40.99%	8	0.17%	876	17.85%	4,908
Worth	6,991	75.10%	2,300	24.71%	18	0.19%	4,691	50.39%	9,309
Totals	2,663,117	50.73%	2,548,017	48.53%	39,771	0.74%	115,100	2.20%	5,250,047 (Note: The 858 qualified write-in votes were not reported at the county level by the Georgia Secretary of State.)

Source: Georgia Secretary of State

==== Counties that flipped from Democratic to Republican ====
- Baldwin (largest city: Milledgeville)
- Jefferson (largest city: Louisville)
- Washington (largest city: Sandersville)

==== By congressional district ====
Trump won nine of 14 congressional districts.

District	Trump	Harris	Representative
1st	57.64%	41.81%	Buddy Carter
2nd	45.99%	53.61%	Sanford Bishop
3rd	64.56%	34.85%	Drew Ferguson (118th Congress)
3rd	64.56%	34.85%	Brian Jack (119th Congress)
4th	23.23%	75.71%	Hank Johnson
5th	13.70%	85.28%	Nikema Williams
6th	24.63%	74.56%	Lucy McBath
7th	60.45%	38.43%	Rich McCormick
8th	65.11%	34.48%	Austin Scott
9th	66.66%	32.59%	Andrew Clyde
10th	60.09%	39.29%	Mike Collins
11th	61.18%	37.88%	Barry Loudermilk
12th	56.82%	42.69%	Rick Allen
13th	28.41%	70.67%	David Scott
14th	68.07%	31.28%	Marjorie Taylor Greene

== Analysis ==
Georgia, North Carolina, and Utah were among the few states in the country to have many counties swing leftward in 2024.

Despite being located in the socially conservative Bible Belt and Deep South regions, Georgia has become competitive since the start of the 2020s. Having been a moderately red state in the late 2000s through the 2010s, Georgia is currently a purple to slightly red state, being a crucial battleground at the presidential and U.S. Senate levels while maintaining a Republican lean at the state level. The last Republican presidential candidate to win Georgia by a double-digit margin, and the only one to carry the state in consecutive elections, was George W. Bush. This leftward shift is mainly attributed to the rapid population growth that the progressive and diverse Atlanta metro, which holds the majority of the state's population, has experienced in the 21st century, including an influx of African Americans, Asian Americans, Hispanic Americans, and progressive Whites. In 2020, Joe Biden very narrowly carried the state by 0.23%, making Georgia the closest state in that election and making Biden the first Democrat since Southerner Bill Clinton of Arkansas in 1992 to win the state's electoral votes. Before Biden's withdrawal from the presidential race, Trump led virtually every poll in Georgia, with the state being generally considered as leaning Republican; however, after Kamala Harris became the Democratic nominee, polls pointed to a much tighter race, rendering Georgia a tossup once again.

=== National trends ===
This was the first presidential election since 1988 that Georgia voted to the left of Nevada. Georgia also voted over 10% to the left of Florida (which was Trump's home state), and 1% to the left of North Carolina.

In the Southern United States, racial polarization is stronger than educational polarization. Georgia voted less than 0.5% to the right of Pennsylvania, because the mathematics of educational polarization can benefit Democrats when combined with an inelastic base of Black voters (88-11% for Democrats). Georgia whites without college degrees are already extremely Republican (82-18% for Republicans), so Democrats just need to win enough college-educated Whites (57-43% for Republicans). Harris fell slightly short in 2024, but Raphael Warnock was able to win an outright majority in 2022 by winning voters with graduate degrees 60-38% and losing all other educational groups.

The leftward swings in many Georgia and North Carolina counties may have been related, as part of a leftward swing in the Piedmont Atlantic megaregion due to Hurricane Helene. However, every county in the neighboring states of Florida, Alabama, Tennessee, and South Carolina swung rightward from 2020.

=== County swings ===
Trump narrowly flipped three Georgia counties in the Black Belt: the swing counties of Baldwin and Washington (the latter of which is majority-Black), becoming the first presidential Republican to do so since George W. Bush in 2004, as well as Jefferson County (also majority-Black), which he became the first presidential Republican to win since George H. W. Bush in 1988. Trump is now the second Republican presidential candidate to prevail in Georgia more than once, following George W. Bush. However, despite Harris losing Georgia and the election, she managed to improve on Biden's margins in a few Atlanta suburban counties, including but not limited to Fayette, where her 3.1% defeat was the closest a presidential Democrat has come to winning the county since favorite son Jimmy Carter comfortably did so in 1976; Henry, where her 29.7% victory was the best performance for a Democrat at said electoral level since the same election; and Cherokee, where she became the first presidential Democrat to break more than 30% of the county vote since Carter in 1980. Georgia was one of only six states where Harris received more raw votes than Biden in 2020, (Note: The other five states were Maine, Nevada, North Carolina, Utah, and Wisconsin.) but of those, she made her greatest raw vote gain compared to Biden in Georgia, winning 75,000 more votes.

=== Exit poll data ===
2024 presidential election in Georgia voter demographics
Demographic subgroup	Trump	Harris	% of total vote
Ideology
Liberals	7	93	22
Moderates	41	58	40
Conservatives	88	12	38
Party
Democrats	2	97	34
Republicans	95	5	35
Independents	55	44	30
Gender
Men	56	43	46
Women	46	53	54
Race/ethnicity
White	71	28	59
Black	11	88	29
Latino	41	59	8
Asian	n/a	n/a	2
All other races	57	43	3
Gender by race/ethnicity
White men	75	24	28
White women	68	31	30
Black men	16	83	12
Black women	8	91	17
Latino men	43	56	4
Latina women	38	61	4
All other races	55	43	5
White born-again or evangelical Christian?
Yes	91	9	31
No	33	66	69
Age
18–29 years old	38	61	18
30–44 years old	45	54	25
45–64 years old	56	43	35
65 and older	60	39	22
First time voter
Yes	47	53	8
No	53	47	92
2020 presidential vote
Biden	6	93	42
Trump	97	3	43
Another candidate	n/a	n/a	2
Did not vote	41	57	11
Education
No college degree	56	43	60
College graduate	43	56	40
Educational attainment
Never attended college	65	34	18
Some college	55	44	27
Associate degree	47	52	16
Bachelor's degree	48	51	22
Advanced degree	37	63	17
Education by race
White college graduates	57	43	25
White no college degree	82	18	34
Non-white college graduates	20	78	15
Non-white no college degree	22	77	26
Education by gender among White voters
White college graduate women	49	51	12
White women no degree	82	18	18
White college graduate men	65	34	12
White men no degree	82	17	16
Voters of color	21	77	41
Area type
Urban	33	66	23
Suburban	53	47	58
Rural	66	33	19
Biden job approval
Strongly disapprove	97	3	47
Somewhat disapprove	39	60	11
Somewhat approve	7	93	25
Strongly approve	1	98	16
Feeling about the way things are going in U.S.
Angry	82	17	24
Dissatisfied	57	42	47
Satisfied	15	84	21
Enthusiastic	6	94	6
Quality of candidate that mattered most
Has ability to lead	70	29	32
Can bring needed change	74	25	26
Has good judgment	19	79	18
Cares about people like me	19	80	21
Vote for president mainly
For your candidate	53	47	80
Against their opponent	42	56	19
Issue regarded as most important
Democracy	18	82	28
Economy	73	26	40
Abortion	22	76	14
Immigration	81	18	13
Foreign policy	n/a	n/a	4
Democracy threatened in the United States
Democracy in the U.S. very threatened	62	37	32
Democracy in the U.S. somewhat threatened	50	49	36
Democracy in the U.S. somewhat secure	41	57	23
Democracy in the U.S. very secure	29	70	7
Confident election being conducted fairly and accurately
Very confident	28	71	39
Somewhat confident	61	38	41
Not very confident	82	18	13
Not at all confident	n/a	n/a	5
Condition of the nation's economy
Poor	90	10	33
Not so good	49	50	40
Good	8	91	24
Excellent	n/a	n/a	3
Family's financial situation today
Worse than four years ago	76	24	53
About the same	28	71	28
Better than four years ago	14	85	18
Abortion should be
Legal in all cases	11	89	33
Legal in most cases	49	50	29
Illegal in most cases	93	7	28
Illegal in all cases	92	8	7
Who do you trust more to handle racial issues?
Harris	6	94	49
Trump	99	1	48

== See also ==
- United States presidential elections in Georgia
- 2024 United States presidential election
- 2024 Democratic Party presidential primaries
- 2024 Republican Party presidential primaries
- 2024 Georgia state elections
- 2024 United States elections

== Notes ==
Partisan clients
