= Rita Jackson Samuels =

American women's and civil rights activist

Rita Jackson Samuels (April 25, 1945 – March 27, 2018) was an activist in the women's rights and civil rights movements. She worked as a secretary for the Southern Christian Leadership Conference and participated in the 1965 Selma to Montgomery march. She was the first African-American woman to serve on the staff of the governor of Georgia, then-governor Jimmy Carter. Samuels later served as a White House consultant during the Carter administration. In 1980, Samuels founded the Georgia Coalition of Black Women and served as executive director. She was the first African-American to serve on the Georgia State Election Board. In 2010, she was inducted into the International Civil Rights Walk of Fame.
