= Evelyn G. Lowery =

American activist (1925–2013)

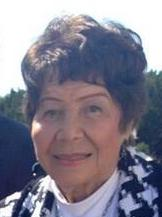
- Born: Evelyn Gibson; February 16, 1925; Memphis, Tennessee, U.S.
- Died: September 26, 2013 (aged 88); Atlanta, Georgia, U.S.
- Organization(s): SCLC/W.O.M.E.N. Inc. Lowery Institute
- Movement: Civil Rights Movement
- Spouse: Joseph Lowery (m. 1950)
- Children: 3
- Awards: SCLC Rosa Parks Award

Evelyn Gibson Lowery (February 16, 1925 – September 26, 2013) was an American civil rights activist and leader.

== Biography ==
Lowery was born in Memphis, Tennessee, on February 16, 1925, and was the daughter of activists Rev. Dr. Harry and Evelyn Gibson. They provided her with the inspiration that became the foundation for a lifetime of involvement in human rights at both the national and international levels. Her father served as president of the Memphis chapter of the NAACP and her mother was involved in community organizations. She attended Clark College and Youngstown University. She married Rev. Joseph Lowery in 1950. He was President Emeritus of the Southern Christian Leadership Conference (SCLC) and worked alongside Martin Luther King Jr. during the Civil Rights Movement. She also marched in the historic Selma to Montgomery March in 1965, and re-enacted the trip several times.

In 1979, seeing a special need for women and families, Lowery founded SCLC/Women's Organizational Movement for Equality Now, Inc. (W.O.M.E.N.), the sister organization of the Southern Christian Leadership Conference. It was organized to champion the rights of women, children, families, and responding to the problems of the disenfranchised regardless of ethnicity, gender, age, or religion. Through that organization she spearheaded education and mentoring programs, HIV/AIDS awareness initiatives and raised over $350,000 for scholarships for high school seniors. Over the years, Lowery also took the lead in recognizing the contributions of fellow activists. She moved to develop coalitions and alliances with a variety of women's groups throughout the nation and other parts of the world.

In 1980, Lowery created the Drum Major For Justice Award, held annually near the April 4 anniversary of the assassination of Dr. Martin Luther King Jr., the founding president of SCLC, who wanted to be remembered as "a Drum Major For Justice." The awardees are recognized by their contributions to the cause of freedom, equality, and achievement in their professional fields. A partial list of awardees includes Rosa Parks, The Original Tuskegee Airmen, Rev. Hosea Williams, Maya Angelou, Harry Belafonte, Bill Cosby, Oprah Winfrey, Dr. Mae Jemison, Andrew Young, Rev. Jesse Jackson Sr., and James Meredith. She was also responsible for the erection of the Civil Rights Freedom Wall in Perry County, Alabama, and monuments honoring movement icons such as Viola Liuzzo, John Lewis and Hosea Williams.

In 2004 Lowery was herself honored at the International Civil Rights Walk of Fame at the Martin Luther King Jr. National Historic Site, located in Atlanta, Georgia.

== Death ==
Lowery was hospitalized on September 18, 2013, after suffering a severe stroke. She died September 26, 2013, at her home in Georgia. She was 88.
