= Joseph Lowery =

American minister and civil rights activist (1921–2020)

The Reverend Joseph Lowery
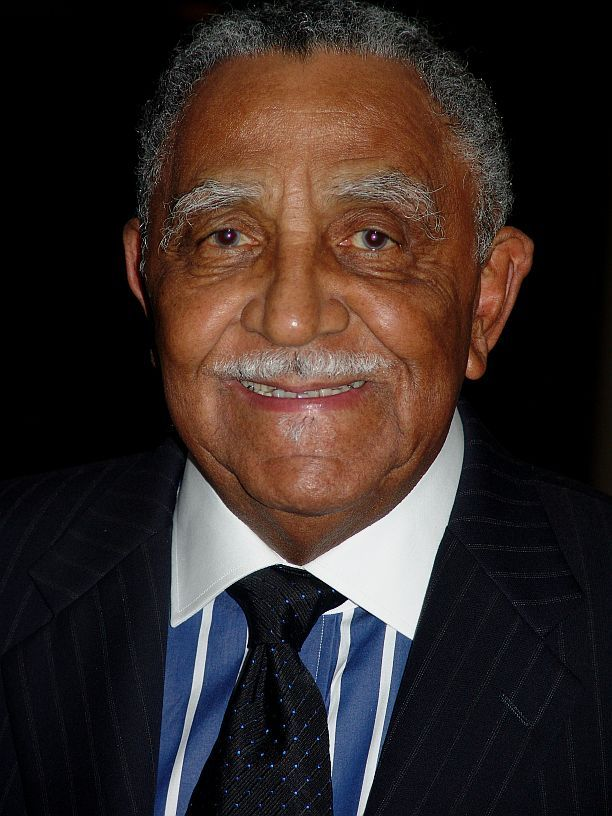
- Lowery in 2000

3rd President of the Southern Christian Leadership Conference
- In office 1977–1997
- Preceded by: Ralph Abernathy
- Succeeded by: Martin Luther King III

Personal details
- Born: Joseph Echols Lowery; October 6, 1921 Huntsville, Alabama, U.S.
- Died: March 27, 2020 (aged 98) Atlanta, Georgia, U.S.
- Spouses: Agnes Moore (divorced) Evelyn Gibson (m. 1950; died 2013)
- Children: 5
- Education: Paine College; Payne Theological Seminary
- Known for: Civil rights movement
- Awards: Presidential Medal of Freedom (2009)
- Affiliations: Georgia's Coalition for the People's Agenda; Alabama Civic Affairs Association; Black Leadership Forum; Lowery Institute

Joseph Echols Lowery (October 6, 1921 – March 27, 2020) was an American minister in the United Methodist Church and leader in the civil rights movement. He founded the Southern Christian Leadership Conference with Martin Luther King Jr. and others, serving as its vice president, later chairman of the board, and its third president from 1977 to 1997. Lowery participated in most of the major activities of the civil rights movement in the 1950s and 1960s, and continued his civil rights work into the 21st century. He was called the "Dean of the Civil Rights Movement". In 2009, Lowery received the Presidential Medal of Freedom from U.S. President Barack Obama.

== Biography ==
Joseph E. Lowery was born to Leroy and Dora Lowery on October 6, 1921. His mother was a teacher and his father owned a small business in Alabama. When he was 11, he was abused and punched by a white police officer for not getting off the sidewalk as a white man was passing. Lowery ran home to get a gun, but his father arrived and talked him out of it. His family sent him away while he attended middle school in Chicago, staying with relatives, but he returned to Huntsville, Alabama, to complete William Hooper Councill High School. He attended Knoxville College and Alabama A&M College. Lowery graduated from Paine College. He was a member of Alpha Phi Alpha fraternity.

He attended ministerial training at Payne Theological Seminary and later on, he completed a Doctor of Divinity degree at the Chicago Ecumenical Institute. He married Evelyn Gibson in 1950, a civil rights activist and leader in her own right. She was the sister of the late Harry Gibson, an activist, and elder member of the Northern Illinois conference of the United Methodist Church, Chicago area. She died on September 26, 2013. They had three daughters: Yvonne Kennedy, Karen Lowery, and Cheryl Lowery-Osborne. Lowery also had two sons, Joseph Jr. and LeRoy III, from an earlier marriage to Agnes Moore.

=== American civil rights career ===
Lowery was pastor of the Warren Street Methodist Church, in Mobile, Alabama, from 1952 to 1961. His career in the Civil Rights Movement took off in the early 1950s. After Rosa Parks' arrest in 1955, he helped lead the Montgomery bus boycott. He headed the Alabama Civic Affairs Association, an organization devoted to the desegregation of buses and public places. In 1957, along with Martin Luther King Jr., Fred Shuttlesworth, and others, Lowery founded the Southern Christian Leadership Conference and subsequently led the organization as its president from 1977 to 1997.

Lowery's car and other property, along with that of other civil rights leaders, was seized in 1959 by the State of Alabama to pay damages resulting from a libel suit. The Supreme Court of the United States later reversed this decision in New York Times Co. v. Sullivan. At the request of King, Lowery participated in the Selma to Montgomery march of 1965.

He was a co-founder and president of the Black Leadership Forum, a consortium of black advocacy groups. This Forum protested the existence of Apartheid in South Africa from the mid-1970s through the end of white minority rule there. Lowery was among the first five black men to be arrested outside the South African Embassy in Washington, D.C., during the Free South Africa movement. He served as the pastor of Cascade United Methodist Church in Atlanta from 1986 through 1992, adding over a thousand members and leaving the church with 10 acres (40,000 m^{2}) of land.

To honor him, the city government of Atlanta renamed Ashby Street for him. Joseph E. Lowery Boulevard is just west of downtown Atlanta and runs north–south beginning at West Marietta Street near the campus of the Georgia Institute of Technology and stretching to White Street in the "West End" neighborhood, running past Atlanta's Historically Black Colleges and Universities: Clark Atlanta University, Spelman College, Morehouse College, and Morris Brown College.

Lowery advocated for LGBT civil rights, including civil unions and, in 2012, same-sex marriage.

=== Death ===
Lowery died on March 27, 2020, in Atlanta, Georgia.

=== Awards ===
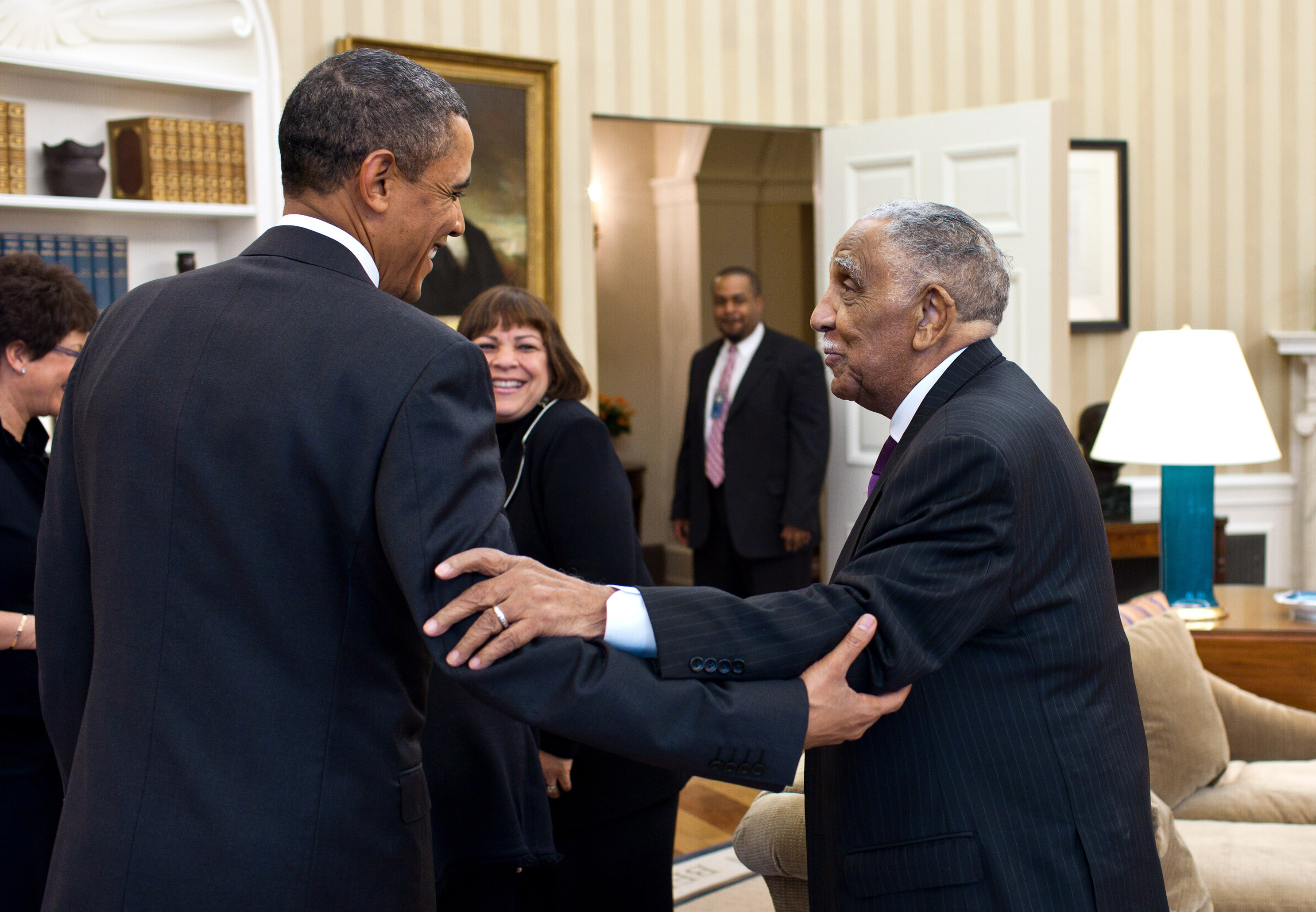
Lowery meeting with President Barack Obama at the White House in 2011

Lowery received several awards. The NAACP gave him their Lifetime Achievement Award at its 1997 convention calling him the "dean of the civil rights movement". He received the inaugural Walter P. Reuther Humanitarian Award from Wayne State University in 2003. He has also received the Martin Luther King Jr. Center Peace Award and the National Urban League's Whitney M. Young Jr. Lifetime Achievement Award, in 2004. Ebony named him one of the 15 greatest black preachers, describing him as, "the consummate voice of biblical social relevancy, a focused voice, speaking truth to power." Lowery also received several honorary doctorates from colleges and universities including, Dillard University, Morehouse College, Alabama State University, University of Alabama in Huntsville, and Emory University. In 2004, Lowery was honored at the International Civil Rights Walk of Fame at the Martin Luther King Jr. National Historic Site, located in Atlanta, Georgia.

Lowery was awarded the Presidential Medal of Freedom by Barack Obama, on July 30, 2009. He was also given the Fred L. Shuttlesworth Human Rights Award by the Birmingham Civil Rights Institute that year.

Delta Air Lines Boeing 757-200 N6716C is named for Lowery.

== Remarks at Coretta Scott King's funeral ==
In 2006, at Coretta Scott King's funeral, Lowery received a standing ovation when he denounced the violence of war in Iraq compared to injustice for the poor, remarking before four U.S. presidents in attendance:

We know now there were no weapons of mass destruction over there. But Coretta knew and we know that there are weapons of misdirection right down here. Millions without health insurance. Poverty abounds. For war billions more but no more for the poor!

Conservative observers said his comments were inappropriate in a setting meant to honor the life of Mrs. King, especially considering George W. Bush was present at the ceremony.

== President Barack Obama's inauguration benediction ==
On January 20, 2009, Lowery delivered the benediction at the inauguration of Senator Barack Obama as the 44th President of the United States of America. He opened with lines from "Lift Every Voice and Sing", also known as "The Negro National Anthem", by James Weldon Johnson. He concluded with the following, an interpolation of Big Bill Broonzy's "Black, Brown and White":

Lord, in the memory of all the saints who from their labors rest, and in the joy of a new beginning, we ask you to help us work for that day when black will not be asked to get [in] back, when brown can stick around, when yellow will be mellow, when the red man can get ahead, man; and when white will embrace what is right. Let all those who do justice and love mercy say Amen! Say Amen! And Amen!

A number of conservative pundits including Glenn Beck, Michael Savage, and Michelle Malkin criticized this final passage, accusing it of being "divisive" and "racialist". Reporters in attendance called the passage a mocking of racial stereotypes, and said that the crowd received it with good humor.

== See also ==
- List of civil rights leaders
