= Paul L. Brady =

American civil rights advocate and judge

- Born: Paul Lawrence Brady; September 28, 1927 (age 98); Flint, Michigan, U.S.
- Education: Washburn University (JD); University of Kansas (LLB); Georgetown Law School (MA)
- Occupations: Federal administrative law judge, civil rights advocate
- Political party: Democratic
- Spouse: Xernona Clayton (m. 1974)
- Children: 2

Paul Lawrence Brady (born September 28, 1927) is an American civil rights advocate, author and former federal administrative law judge, the first African-American to achieve this position in 1972. He retired in 1997.

== Biography ==
Born in Flint, Michigan, he graduated from Flint Central High School. After high school, he served in the United States Navy. He was a private practice judge, a Social Security Administration hearing examiner and a trial attorney for the Federal Power Commission. He was a graduate of the University of Michigan, the University of Kansas and Washburn University.

Brady published A Certain Blindness chronicling his ancestors history on their arrival in the United States, and received many accolades from civil rights groups during his career. Brady is a great-nephew of Bass Reeves, who was among the first African Americans to receive a commission as a Deputy U.S. Marshal west of the Mississippi River, and the second husband of Xernona Clayton, a civil rights leader.
