= John Edward Jacob =

American civil right leader (born 1934)

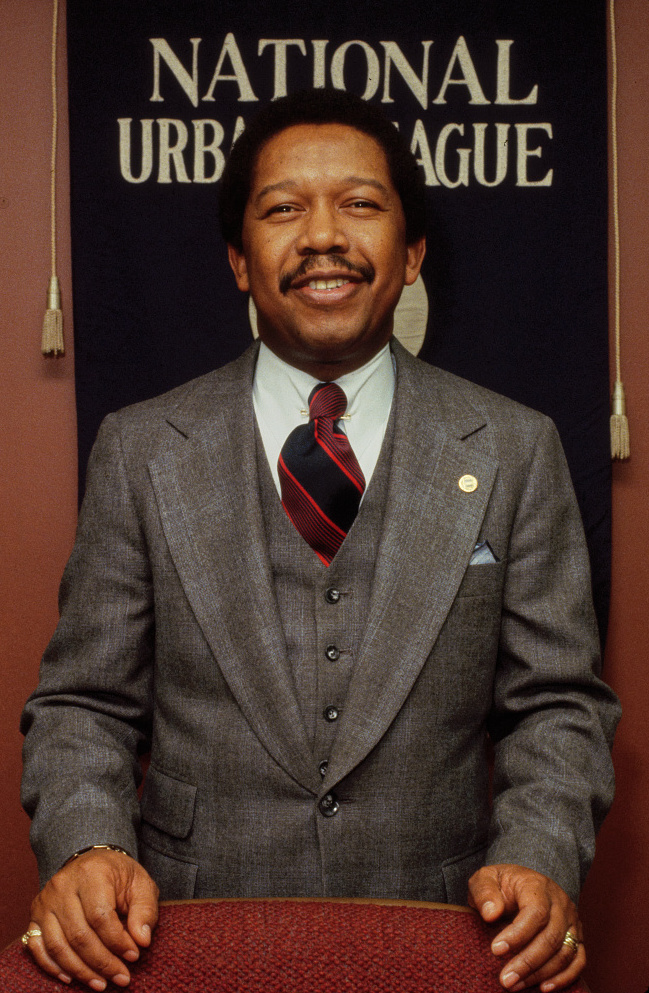
Jacob in 1981

John Edward Jacob (born 1934 in Trout, Louisiana) is a U.S. civil rights leader. He served as the president of the National Urban League between 1982 and 1994.

Jacob received his B.A. and M.A. degrees from Howard University and was a social worker in Baltimore before joining the Urban League. In 1965, he became director of education and youth incentives at the Washington, D.C. chapter. Later he served as president and executive director of the San Diego Urban League. In 1979 he became executive vice-president of the national office under Vernon Jordan, whom he succeeded as president.

During his tenure as Urban League president, Jacob fought cutbacks in federal social programs and the weakening of civil rights enforcement under the Reagan Administration. In particular, he objected to the appointment of a conservative majority to the Civil Rights Commission that was hostile to vigorous protection of civil rights, as well as the Justice Department's prosecutions of other public agencies engaged in affirmative action.

== Urban Marshall Plan ==
In the early 1980s, Jacob helped develop a plan for urban recovery similar to the 1947 Marshall Plan initiated to assist European nations after World War II. Aid was sought from private sectors to facilitate entry-level job training programs, and Jacob proposed the League give direct assistance from its own resources to poverty-stricken minorities and whites, including housing and job placement. In addition, he recommended the federal government institute full employment through substantial public works and job training programs, and along with other civil rights groups, supported economic pressure in the corporate world to develop markets and jobs for minorities.

The son of a Baptist minister, Jacob was also an adherent of self-help. He promoted SAT tutoring, comprehensive teenage pregnancy prevention, and a male responsibility program for fatherhood, to address issues contributing to the cycle of poverty in the African-American community. Jacob added voter registration, education, and drug control to the League's agenda of priorities.

In contrast to Reagan, George H. W. Bush was initially receptive to Jacob's domestic Marshall Plan proposal, and Jacob welcomed dialogue with the new administration. But Bush's veto of the Civil Rights Act of 1990 soured the relationship. The early 1990s also saw new court decisions and conservative political pressure against affirmative action policies the Urban League supported.
