= Thomas Dortch =

Civic leader and businessman

Thomas W. Dortch Jr.
- Born: April 12, 1950; Toccoa, Georgia
- Died: February 15, 2023 (aged 72); Atlanta, Georgia
- Education: Fort Valley State University (Bachelor's)
- Alma mater: Clark Atlanta University (Master's)

Thomas W. Dortch Jr. (born April 12, 1950 in Toccoa, Georgia - February 15, 2023) was an American civic leader and businessman based in Atlanta, Georgia. By 1990, he became the first black man to be chief administrator for a U.S. Senator (Sam Nunn). He was also the first associate director of the Georgia Democratic Party in 1974. He was the chairmen of 100 Black Men of America for over 20 years and also served as CEO, helping to raise over $100 million during that time. He also served as the chairman of Grady Hospital and founded the National Black College Alumni Hall of Fame. He did his undergraduate at Fort Valley State University in sociology and received a master's degree in criminal justice administration from Clark Atlanta University. In 2019, he was added to the International Civil Rights Walk of Fame and in 2022 was recognized by the Atlanta Business Chronicle as a leader in corporate citizenship. Among those attending his funeral were Andrew Young, deputy Prime Minister for the Bahamas Chester Cooper, and George French. The funeral took place at New Birth Missionary Baptist Church.
