= Georgia State Election Board =

State government agency of Georgia, U.S.

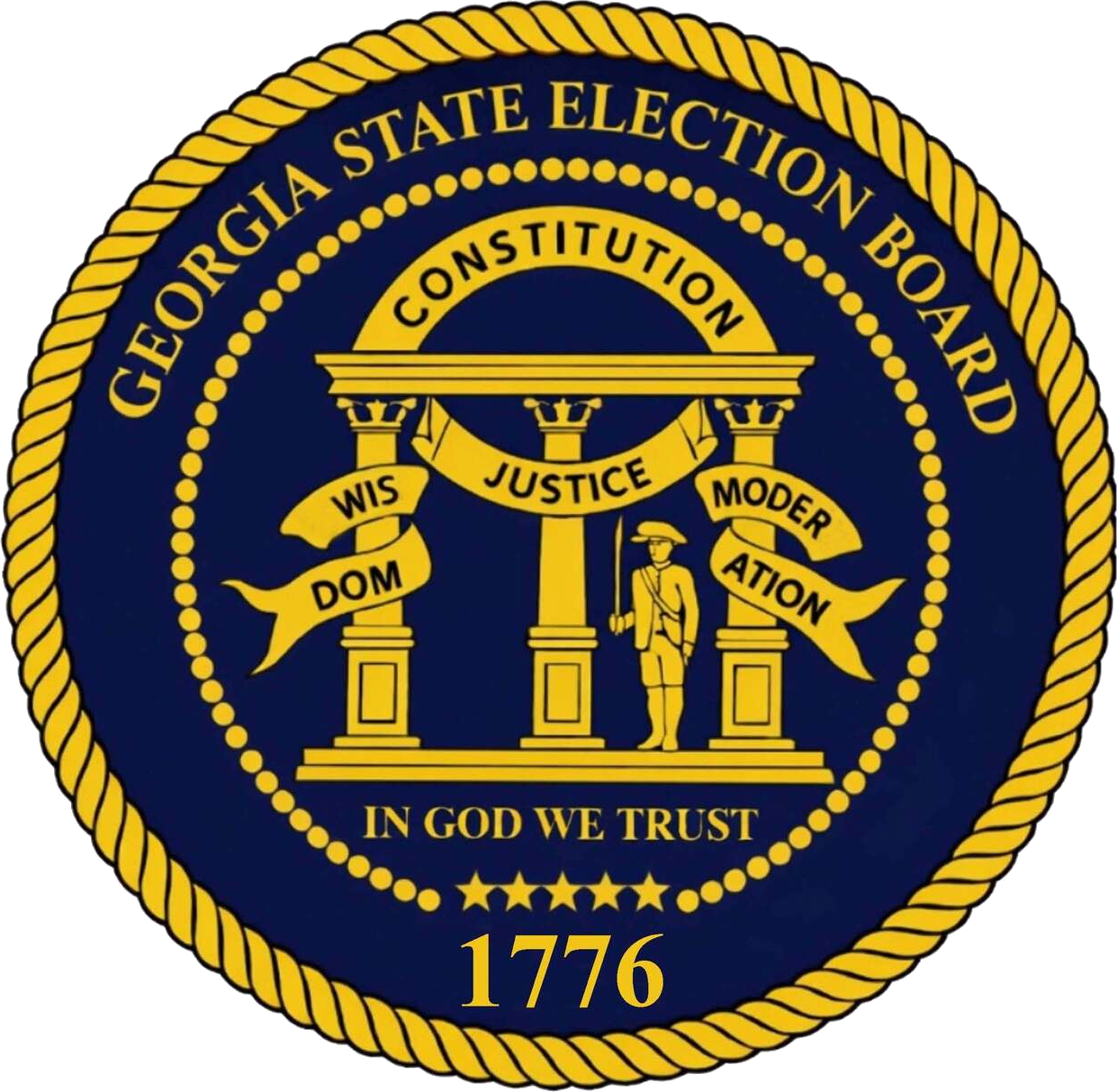

Agency overview
- Jurisdiction: Georgia
- Headquarters: Atlanta
- Agency executive: John Fervier, Chairman
- Parent department: Elections Division of the Georgia Secretary of State’s Office
- Parent agency: Office of the Georgia Secretary of State
- Website: sos.ga.gov/state-election-board

The Georgia State Election Board is an agency of the state government of Georgia responsible for making and enforcing rules that protect the fairness, legality, and orderly conduct of Georgia's election process.

== History ==
In 2024, Georgia Governor Brian Kemp signed Senate Bill 189, removing the Georgia Secretary of State from the State Election Board. It also established the board as its own entity and provided for a budget.

In October 2024, the Georgia Supreme Court issued an order prohibiting the enforcement of newly created election rules that election administrators would have to follow.

== Board composition ==
In 2023, Georgia passed a law stating that the chairperson is elected by the General Assembly, the Senate of the General Assembly, and the House of Representatives of the General Assembly can each elect one member, and that each political party can nominate a member of their party to be appointed by the Governor. No person while a member of the General Assembly shall serve as a member of the board.

=== Current members ===
- John Fervier - Chairman - Appointed: January 5, 2024
- Sara Tindall Ghazal - Member - Appointed: June 1, 2021
- Janice Johnston - Member - Appointed: March 2, 2022
- Salleigh Grubbs - Member - Appointed: December 22, 2025
- Janelle King - Member - Appointed: May 17, 2024

== See also ==
- Elections in Georgia
