= Barbara Lewis King =

American religious leader

Barbara Lewis King (August 26, 1930 – October 11, 2020) was the first bishop of the International New Thought Christian Movement of Churches. She was also the founder of Hillside International Chapel and Truth Center.

== Biography ==
Barbara Lewis King was born in Houston, Texas, to parents Mildred Jackson Shackelford, and Lec Andrew Lewis. She was raised by her paternal grandmother, Ida Bates Lewis. At the age of 13, she volunteered as a Sunday school teacher. At 15, King became a Woman's Day speaker in history at Houston's Antioch Baptist Church.

King was married, with one son, Michael, whom she had despite doctors' prognosis that she could not have children. King also mothered a young woman from Ghana, was the grandmother of five, and the great-grandmother of three.

King earned a BA in sociology from Texas Southern University and a Masters in social work at Atlanta University’s School of Social Work. She also obtained a Doctor of Ministry from the Ecumenical Theological Seminary of Detroit, Michigan in 2012.

== Career ==
After obtaining her Masters, King moved to Chicago and worked as a social work administrator, leading the city’s public housing outreach program. There, she met Rev. Johnnie Colemon, who was the first female African American minister she had ever met, and who inspired her decision to enter the ministry. King then worked as the director of administration of Christ Universal Temple, Rev. Colemon’s church, and was mentored by Colemon throughout her ministerial training in New Thought and Traditional Thought at Missouri’s Unity Institute of Continuing Education and the Baptist Training School in Chicago. Following her training, she was ordained twice, first by Rev. Roy Blake and then by Rev. Colemon.

King then became a professor of social work at Clark Atlanta University, and then the dean of students at Spelman College. She started a Bible study group with 12 members, which grew to become Hillside Chapel and Truth Center. In 1971, King founded the Hillside Chapel and Truth Center. The Hillside Chapel is non-denominational and serves around 5,000 people.

In 2001, King was named the Development Chief of the Assin Nsuta village in Ghana, West Africa, an area with historic routes in the Slave Route Site. She was the first woman to be ordained as a chief in the region. Her stool name is Nana Yaa Twunmwaa I.

King was the first Bishop in the International New Thought Christian Movement. She was committed to “[transforming] lives by practicing and demonstrating the teachings of Jesus The Christ”. She taught and ministered in Finland, Russia, England, Canada, Israel, Egypt, Kenya, Senegal, South Africa, the Caribbean, Brazil, British Guiana (Guyana), and Australia. She led the formation of Hillside Fountain, a South African sister church to her Atlanta church. She ordained the first New Thought minister in South Africa and joined the Sisters of the Boa Morte in Brazil, African origin nuns who were prohibited from serving the traditional church. In 2010, she became the first bishop of the New Thought Christian Movement of Churches.

She was a guest lecturer at Harvard Divinity School Summer Institute for Ministers, and was also involved with Association of Global New Thought, Concerned Black Clergy of Metropolitan Atlanta, Regional Council of Churches, the American Jewish Committee, Life Members of the NAACP, Academy of Certified Social Workers, National Association of Social Workers, Life Member of the National Council of Negro Women, the National Women's Law Center, Chaplain of the City of Atlanta Police Department, and the Mayoral Appointee to the Ethics Board of Metro Atlanta. On November 5, 2018, the Atlanta City Council unanimously adopted a proposal to rename the Interfaith Chapel at Hartsfield-Jackson Atlanta International Airport in her honor and it was done the following year.

Dr. King was a contributor to the Parliament of the World's Religions. In 2015, she was a keynote speaker at the inaugural women's assembly at the convening in Salt Lake City. In 2018, she gave addresses at the Parliament in Toronto.

== Honors ==
- The International New Thought Alliance (INTA) Life Achievement Award
- The Ernest Holmes Religious Science Award
- Unity's The Light of God Expressing Award
- International Civil Rights Walk of Fame, for her work in Dr. Martin Luther King's Chicago movement
- No. 8 on Savoy Magazine's Power Issue of 100 Most Influential Blacks in America in 2008
- Beautiful Are Their Feet Honoree
- International Hall of Honor at Martin Luther King Jr. International Chapel at Morehouse College
- In 2019, the Interfaith Chapel at Hartsfield-Jackson Atlanta International Airport was named the Bishop Dr. Barbara Lewis King Interfaith Chapel

== Works ==
- Transform Your Life
- Major contributor to A New Thought for A New Millennium and Wake Up … Live the Life You Love in Spirit
- In Me, As Me: Ten Principles for Finding the Divine Within and Leave With Love: A Spiritual Guide to Succession Planning
- Piddlin’ For the Soul
- How to Have Flood and Not Drown: Essays on Stress-Free Living
- The Church: A Matter of Consciousness
- What is a Miracle?
- Prosperity that Can’t Quit
