= University of Georgia desegregation riot =

1961 mob violence in Athens, Georgia, US

The University of Georgia desegregation riot was an incident of mob violence by proponents of racial segregation on January 11, 1961. The riot was caused by segregationists' protest over the desegregation of the University of Georgia (UGA) in Athens, Georgia following the enrollment of Hamilton E. Holmes and Charlayne Hunter, two African American students. The two had been admitted to the school several days earlier following a lengthy application process that led to a court order mandating that the university accept them. On January 11, a group of approximately 1,000 people (including members of the Ku Klux Klan) conducted a riot outside of Hunter's dormitory. In the aftermath, Holmes and Hunter were suspended by the university's dean, though this suspension was later overturned by a court order. Several rioters were arrested, with several students placed on disciplinary probation, but no one was charged with inciting the riot. In an investigation conducted by the Federal Bureau of Investigation, it was revealed that some of the riot organizers were in contact with elected state officials who approved of the riot and assured them of immunity for conducting the riot.

Following the riot, Holmes and Hunter continued their education at UGA, graduating several years later and holding careers in their fields. The integration at UGA was followed by further integration at universities throughout the state in the following years.

== Background ==
=== Segregation at the University of Georgia ===
Until the later half of the 20th century, the University of Georgia (UGA, located in Athens, Georgia) was a racially segregated university that did not admit African Americans. In 1867, there was an attempt by several freedmen to gain admittance to the university, but with the 1896 U.S. Supreme Court ruling of Plessy v. Ferguson and the legal doctrine of separate but equal, UGA, like many others in the United States, remained segregated into the early 20th century. However, starting in 1936, the National Association for the Advancement of Colored People (NAACP) began a campaign that aimed to desegregate universities in the Southern United States. These efforts were led primarily by Charles Hamilton Houston and the NAACP Legal Defense and Educational Fund. Over the next several decades, a number of Supreme Court cases (such as Murray v. Pearson, Missouri ex rel. Gaines v. Canada, and McLaurin v. Oklahoma State Regents) led to several all-white universities admitting African Americans for major programs not offered at African American universities. In Georgia, Governor Eugene Talmadge's opposition to integration led to the Cocking affair of 1941, wherein several members of the Georgia Board of Regents who were suspected of supporting integration were replaced or dismissed by Talmadge. In 1950, as part of NAACP efforts to integrate UGA, Horace Ward applied to the University of Georgia School of Law. He was denied entry, with legal challenges against the university eventually ruled moot. However, in 1954, the U.S. Supreme Court's landmark decision in Brown v. Board of Education ruled that racial segregation of public schools was unconstitutional, leading to greater integration in the proceeding years. Despite this, by 1960, public universities in the southern states of Alabama, Georgia, Mississippi, and South Carolina still remained completely segregated.

=== Holmes and Hunter apply to UGA ===
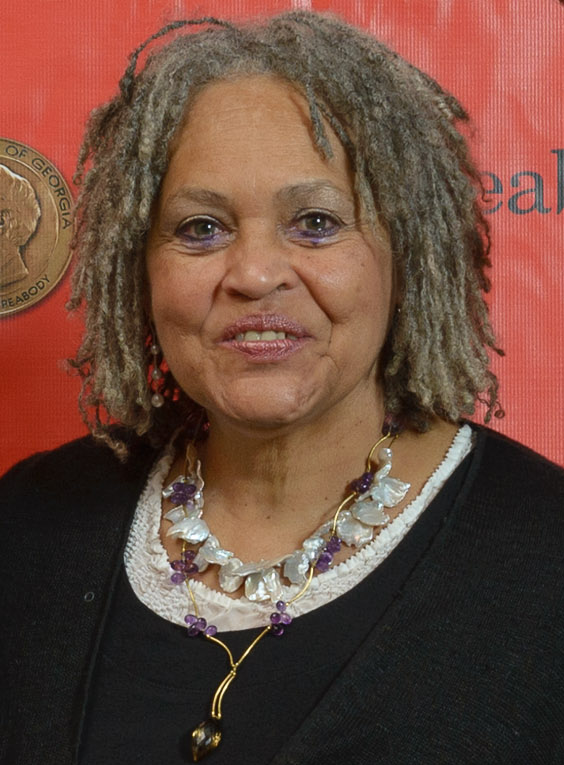
Charlayne Hunter (seen here in 2014) applied to the University of Georgia in 1959 along with Hamilton E. Holmes.

In summer 1959, Hamilton E. Holmes and Charlayne Hunter applied for admittance to UGA. Both students had attended Turner High School, an all-African American high school in Atlanta. Holmes had been the valedictorian, class president, and team captain of the football team, while Hunter was the lead editor for the school newspaper and had similarly finished near the top of her class. Holmes hoped to enroll in the pre-medical track at UGA, while Hunter intended to study journalism. However, two weeks after the two students had applied, Registrar Walter Danner denied their admission. According to the registrar, the freshman dormitories were at full occupancy and no more students could be admitted. Following the rejection, the two students enrolled in other colleges for the fall semester, with Holmes going to Morehouse College and Hunter going to Wayne State University. However, the two continued to reapply to UGA every semester, each time again being denied based on full occupancy. In summer 1960, after again being denied entry for the fall 1960 semester, they appealed the decision to Chancellor Harmon White Caldwell of the University System of Georgia (USG), who refused to take action on the matter. Subsequently, they petitioned the Board of Regents for admission, but as their decision would take several months, attorneys representing Holmes and Hunter began seeking a preliminary injunction from the United States District Court for the Middle District of Georgia that would prohibit UGA from denying them admission based on race. Attorneys representing the applicants included Donald L. Hollowell, Vernon Jordan, Constance Baker Motley, and Ward, who, after being denied entry to UGA, had enrolled at the Northwestern University Pritzker School of Law.

On September 13, 1960, United States federal judge William Augustus Bootle started a hearing on the matter, wherein Attorney General of Georgia Eugene Cook claimed that the applicants had filled out their admission forms incorrectly and, as the Board of Regents had not yet met to decide on their appeal, they had not exhausted all administrative remedies for the case. Bootle did not issue an injunction, but did order the Board to meet and issue a decision on the admissions for Holmes and Hunter within 30 days. After almost the entire allotted time had passed, the Board issued their decision, which was to reject their admission. Following this, Bootle scheduled a pre-trial hearing for November 18 and ordered that the trial would begin the second week of December in the Athens division of the court. Holmes v. Danner, as the case was known, began on December 13. The trial lasted several days, and on January 6 of the following year, Bootle ruled that Holmes and Hunter be immediately enrolled at UGA. The following day, Holmes went to the campus to officially enroll. On January 9, both individuals returned to the campus to register for classes and, while there, encountered mobs who yelled racial slurs at them. Over the following weekend, there were additional demonstrations, included some effigy and cross burnings on campus. Journalist Calvin Trillin, who was reporting on the integration at UGA at the time, reported seeing one such attempt on the campus's football practice field.

== Riot ==
Following the enrollment of Holmes and Hunter, a segregation riot was planned by law students for January 11. The students had invited local members of the Ku Klux Klan (KKK) to participate and hoped to replicate a similar segregation riot that had occurred at the University of Alabama in 1956 that successfully prevented the integration of that university. According to historian Robert Mickey, Georgia Lieutenant Governor Garland T. Byrd assured students that they would not face punishment for these actions, either criminal or disciplinary. Additional riot planners claimed that state legislators had given them similar promises of immunity. Some concerned individuals urged the dean of students to ban student gatherings that night and cancel that night's basketball game, but the dean refused both requests. At the time, UGA did not have its own campus police, and the city of Athens had a fairly small police force. Slightly past 10:00 p.m., several students unrolled a large banner outside of Hunter's on-campus dormitory that read "Nigger Go Home" and threw bricks and Coke bottles through her window. More people began to show up outside her dormitory following the basketball game (a close loss to the Georgia Tech Yellow Jackets), with the crowd eventually swelling to approximately a thousand people. Members of the Athens police force had called for assistance from a nearby Georgia State Patrol (GSP) station, but they claimed they could not assist them without an order from the Governor. Ultimately, GSP forces would not be deployed until an hour after the riot was over. The riot was broken up by the introduction of more Athens police officers, who deployed tear gas into the crowds. In the aftermath, several police officers and students suffered minor injuries. When GSP forces did arrive, they escorted Holmes and Hunter back to Atlanta.

== Aftermath ==
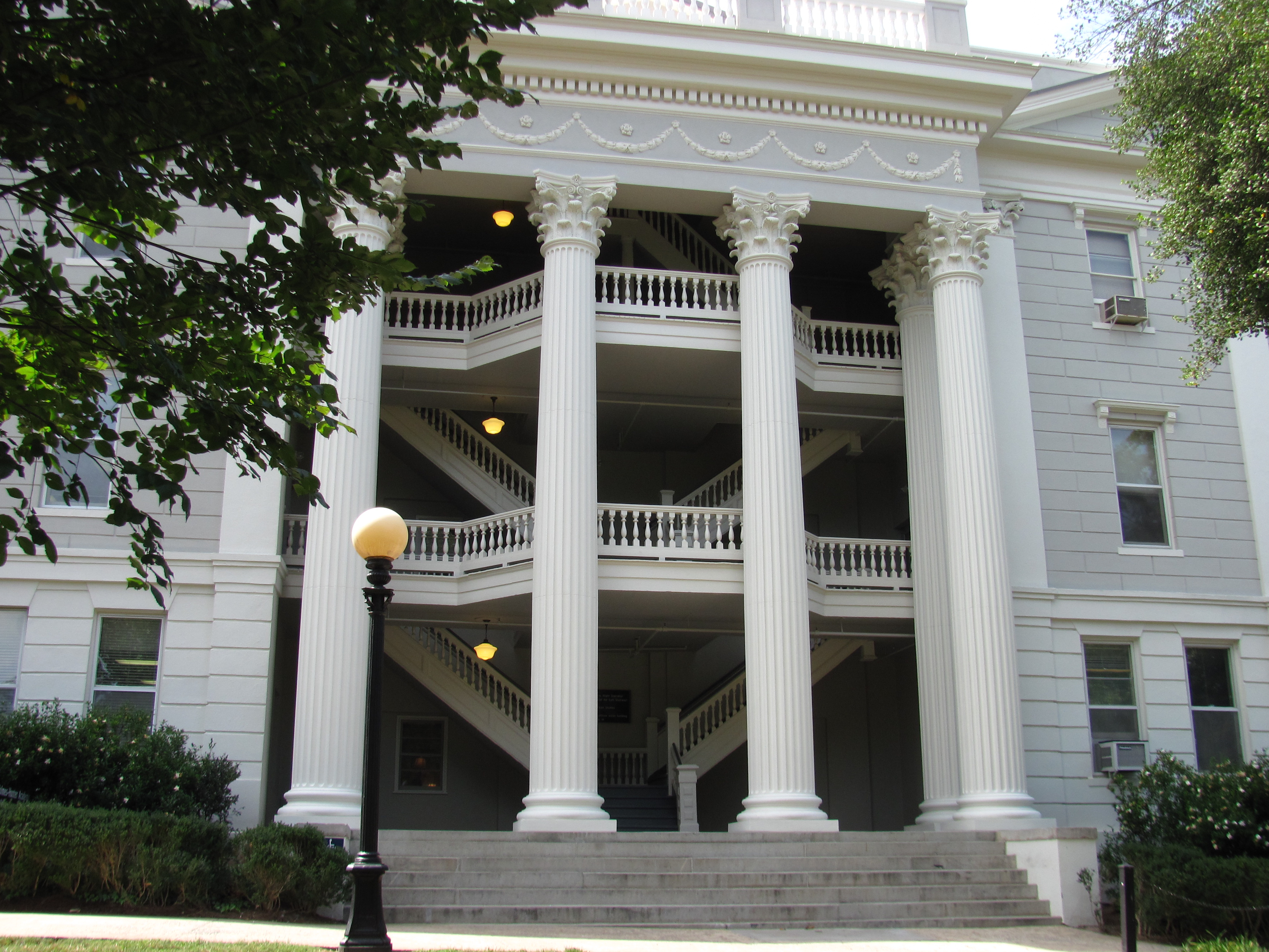
The main academic building, later renamed the Holmes–Hunter Building in honor of the two

Immediately following the riot, the dean of students suspended Holmes and Hunter "in the interest of your personal safety and for the safety and welfare of more than 7,000 other students at the University of Georgia". The following evening, faculty members had assembled at the university's chapel to argue in favor of the two's reinstatement, with a petition for such eventually gaining over 400 faculty signatures. On January 13, Bootle ordered that Holmes and Hunter be reinstated, and they began attending classes the following school day. Following their suspension, the university additionally suspended four students who had organized the riot and placed an additional 18 students on disciplinary probation. Four KKK members, as well as two students, were also arrested for their involvement.

The reenrollment of Holmes and Hunter also spelt the end for a piece of Georgia legislation that forbade state funding to integrated universities, as the Georgia General Assembly later voted to repeal that statute. Holmes and Hunter, understandably, later expressed unpleasantness with their experiences at UGA, though neither were physically threatened again during their time at the university, and both later graduated and had careers in their fields. Integration at UGA was followed by integration at several more universities in the state in the following years, including the Georgia Institute of Technology (1961), Emory University, Mercer University (both 1963), and Berry College (1964). In 2001, UGA renamed their main academic building the Holmes–Hunter Building in honor of the two.

=== State officials support of riot ===
While university officials tried to downplay the role that students had had in planning the riot, emphasizing the role that outsiders played and attributing the riot to frustration at the result of that night's basketball game, historian Robert A. Pratt claims that there is little evidence for this and claims that there is substantial evidence that law students, including members of the Demosthenian Literary Society, had organized the riot. During an investigation conducted by the Federal Bureau of Investigation, one riot leader claimed that he was in daily communications with state officials in the leadup to the riot. Additionally, The Atlanta Journal and The Atlanta Constitution newspapers claimed that eyewitnesses reported that organizers had boasted about their connections with state officials and their assurances that state troopers wouldn't interfere in the riot. Roy V. Harris (a kingmaker in Georgia politics) seemed to acknowledge these claims when, speaking to the press, he said "it was people holding high official positions in the Capitol" who had encouraged the rioters. Ultimately, no riot organizer was charged with intent to incite a riot, nor has any state official claimed collaboration with the rioters.

== See also ==
- Ole Miss riot of 1962
- Stand in the Schoolhouse Door

== Bibliography ==
- Besel, Peter (March 11, 2018). "University of Georgia Desegregation Riot (1961)". BlackPast.org. Archived from the original on January 17, 2021.
- Cook, James F. (August 12, 2002). "Cocking Affair". New Georgia Encyclopedia. Archived from the original on January 18, 2021.
- Dyer, Thomas G. (1985). The University of Georgia: A Bicentennial History, 1785-1985. University of Georgia Press. ISBN 978-0-8203-2398-5 – via Google Books.
- Eagles, Charles W. (2009). The Price of Defiance: James Meredith and the Integration of Ole Miss. University of North Carolina Press. ISBN 978-0-8078-3273-8 – via Google Books.
- Hatfield, Edward A. (May 28, 2008). "Desegregation of Higher Education". New Georgia Encyclopedia. Archived from the original on March 23, 2021.
- Huff, Christopher Allen (June 28, 2007). "Roy V. Harris (1895-1985)". New Georgia Encyclopedia. Archived from the original on April 28, 2021.
- Hunter-Gault, Charlayne (1993). In My Place. Vintage Books. ISBN 978-0-679-74818-2 – via Google Books.
- Mickey, Robert (2015). Paths Out of Dixie: The Democratization of Authoritarian Enclaves in America's Deep South, 1944-1972. Princeton University Press. ISBN 978-1-4008-3878-3 – via Google Books.
- Pratt, Robert A. (2002). We Shall Not Be Moved: The Desegregation of the University of Georgia. University of Georgia Press. ISBN 978-0-8203-2780-8 – via Google Books.
- Trillin, Calvin (1991). An Education in Georgia: Charlayne Hunter, Hamilton Holmes, and the Integration of the University of Georgia. Foreword by Charlayne Hunter-Gault. University of Georgia Press. ISBN 978-0-8203-1388-7 – via Google Books.
