= 1954 Georgia gubernatorial election =

1954 Georgia Democratic gubernatorial primary
- September 8, 1954

410 county unit votes 206 unit votes needed to win
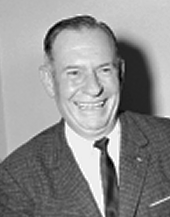

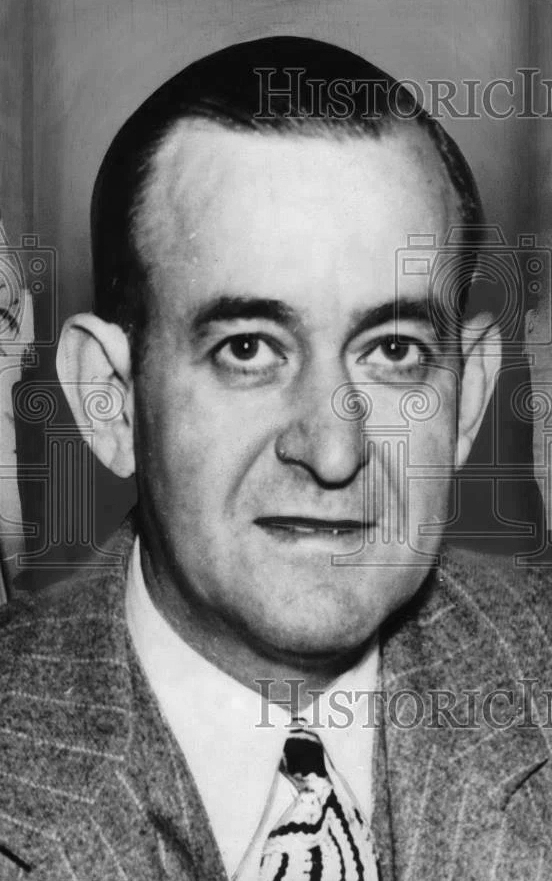

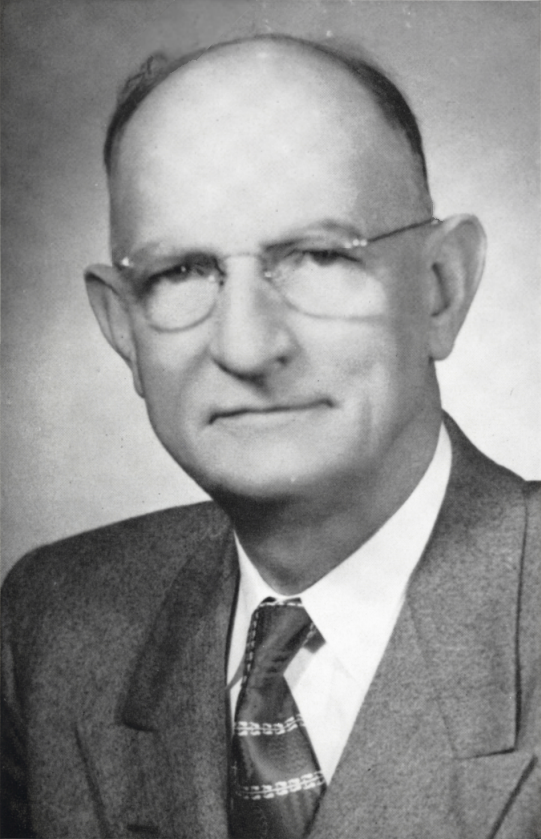

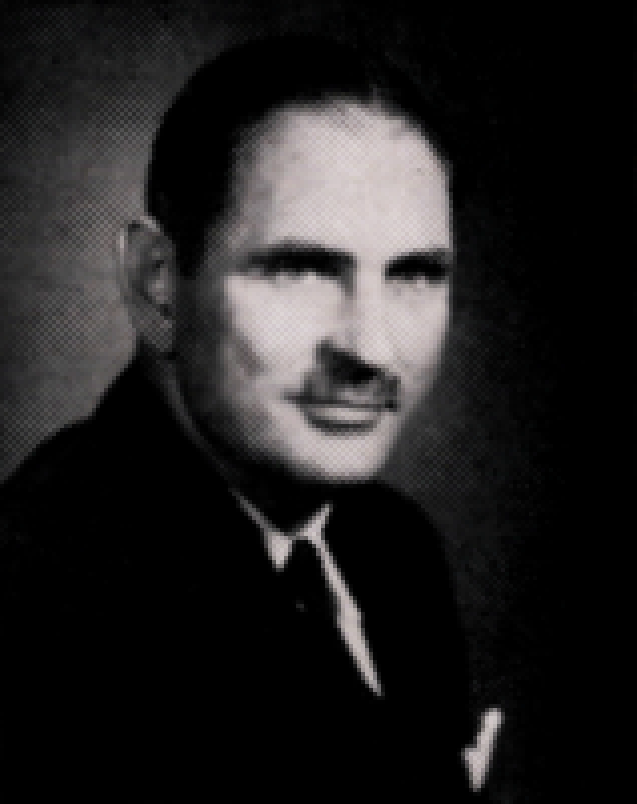

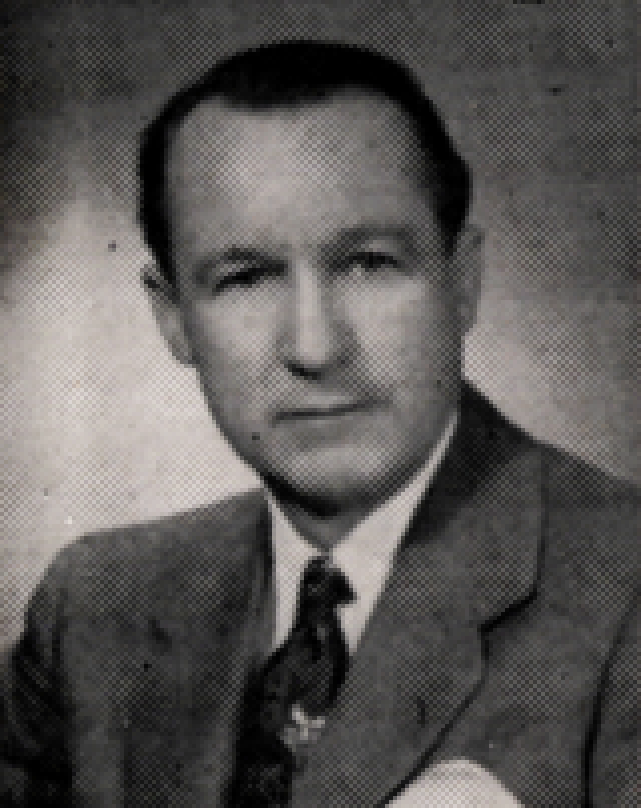
Nominee	Marvin Griffin	Melvin E. Thompson	Tom Linder
Party	Democratic	Democratic	Democratic
Electoral vote	302	56	26
Popular vote	234,690	162,007	87,240
Percentage	36.32%	25.07%	13.50%
Nominee	Frederick Barrow Hand	Charlie Gowen
Party	Democratic	Democratic
Electoral vote	22	4
Popular vote	78,125	73,809
Percentage	12.09%	11.42%
- County results Griffin: 20–30% 30–40% 40–50% 50–60% 60–70% 70–80% Thompson: 30–40% 40–50% 50–60% 60–70% 70–80% Linder: 30–40% 40–50% 50–60% 60–70% Hand: 20–30% 30–40% 40–50% 80–90% Gowen: 80–90%
Governor before election
Herman Talmadge
Democratic
Elected Governor
Marvin Griffin
Democratic

The 1954 Georgia gubernatorial election was held on November 2, 1954.

Lieutenant Governor Marvin Griffin won the Democratic primary on September 8 with 36.52% of the vote and 302 out of 410 county unit votes. At this time, Georgia was a one-party state, and the Democratic nomination was tantamount to victory. Griffin won the November general election without an opponent.

This was the final of Melvin Thompson's three failed bids for Governor.

== Democratic primary ==
=== County unit system ===
From 1917 until 1962, the Democratic Party in the U.S. state of Georgia used a voting system called the county unit system to determine victors in statewide primary elections.

The system was ostensibly designed to function similarly to the Electoral College, but in practice the large ratio of unit votes for small, rural counties to unit votes for more populous urban areas provided outsized political influence to the smaller counties.

Under the county unit system, the 159 counties in Georgia were divided by population into three categories. The largest eight counties were classified as "Urban", the next-largest 30 counties were classified as "Town", and the remaining 121 counties were classified as "Rural". Urban counties were given 6 unit votes, Town counties were given 4 unit votes, and Rural counties were given 2 unit votes, for a total of 410 available unit votes. Each county's unit votes were awarded on a winner-take-all basis.

Candidates were required to obtain a majority of unit votes (not necessarily a majority of the popular vote), or 206 total unit votes, to win the election. If no candidate received a majority in the initial primary, a runoff election was held between the top two candidates to determine a winner.

=== Candidates ===
- Marvin Griffin, incumbent Lieutenant Governor
- Charlie Gowen, State Representative from Brunswick
- Frederick Barrow Hand, Speaker of the Georgia House of Representatives
- Tom Linder, Commissioner of Agriculture
- Melvin Thompson, former Governor (1947–48)

=== Results ===
Candidate	Popular vote		County unit vote	
Candidate	Votes	%	Votes	%
Marvin Griffin	234,690	36.32	302	73.66
Melvin Thompson	162,007	25.07	56	13.66
Tom Linder	87,240	13.50	26	6.34
Frederick Barrow Hand	78,125	12.09	22	5.37
Charlie Gowen	73,809	11.42	4	0.98
Grace Wilkey Thomas	6,285	0.97		
Ben Garland	2,847	0.44		
Edmond Barfield	747	0.12		
Arthur H. Neeson	485	0.08		
Total	646,235	100.00	410	100.00

== General election ==
=== Results ===
Georgia gubernatorial election, 1954
Party	Candidate	Votes	%	±%
Democratic	Marvin Griffin	331,899	99.98%	
N/A	write-ins	67	0.02%	
Majority		331,832	99.96	
Turnout		331,966		
Democratic hold		Swing		
