= Collier Heights =

- Collier Heights Historic District
- U.S. National Register of Historic Places
- U.S. Historic district
- Location within Metro Atlanta
- Location: Atlanta, Georgia
- Coordinates: 33°46′19″N 84°29′2″W
- Built: 1948
- NRHP reference No.: 09000457
- Added to NRHP: June 23, 2009

Historic Collier Heights is a historically middle-class and predominantly African-American populated area in western Atlanta. It is bordered to the west by Fairburn Road, the east by Hamilton E. Holmes Drive, the north by Donald L. Hollowell Parkway, and to the south by the Interstate 20 bridge at Linkwood Road.

Collier Heights is a 1,750-home enclave with mostly brick ranch houses built in the 1950s and 1960s. It is one of the first upscale communities in the nation built exclusively by African-American planners for the emerging Atlanta African-American middle-class. It has been featured in several publications like Ebony and Jet magazines. It was featured in the "Homefinder" section of the Atlanta Journal-Constitution. Since 2009, the area has been listed on the United States National Register of Historic Places. The community achieved local historic designation in June 2013.

== History ==
Collier Heights was founded in 1948 and was sold to African Americans because the land was believed to be undesirable. It became Atlanta's largest and most desirable African American residential community in the mid 20th century. By the 1990s and 2000s, the neighborhood experienced a major decline due to high crime, blight, and low performing zoned public schools. Many middle-class Black families left for homes in southwest Atlanta or outside the city. However, since the 2010s, investments in and around the neighborhood have improved desirability and property values.

Collier Heights has been the home of several notable African Americans including Cynthia McKinney, Emmanuel Lewis, Billy McKinney, Leroy Johnson, Jasmine Guy, Asa G. Yancey, Sr., Herman J. Russell, Martin Luther King, Sr, Donald Hollowell, Ralph David and Juanita Abernathy, Christine King Farris, Keisha Lance Bottoms, Whitman Mayo, and Andre Dickens.

== Neighborhood organization ==
Historic Collier Heights has two officially recognized community Associations which represent the citizens of the Historic District. The inaugural Association is The Collier Heights Community Association (CHCA)–which formed in 1968. The second and more popular organization is The Historic Collier Heights Community Association (Historic Collier), which is the largest neighborhood organization in Historic Collier Heights and encompasses the entire community/neighborhood. Key committees within the CHCA and the "Historic Collier" Association are the Historic Committee, which focuses on master planning for preserving the history of the community and neighborhood improvement projects.

Both associations are popular and organize festivities throughout the year like the National Night Out (a summer block party) a Christmas party, and the Historic Collier's "Salute To Legends" celebration, which pays homage to famous residents of the area. Executive committee members are voted into office for one-year terms. Elections are held in December at the Association's annual Christmas party.

The CHCA meets the 2nd Tuesday of every month at Berean Seventh-Day Adventist Church (291 Hamilton E Holmes Dr NW) at 6:30 pm. The "Historic Collier" Association meets on the 1st Thursday of every month at St. Paul of the Cross Church (551 Harwell Rd NW) at 7:00 pm. Both organizations are on Facebook, Twitter, and TikTok. The more prominent association, "Historic Collier" Association has a website, historiccollier.com

== Awards and recognitions ==
Atlanta declared September 8, 2009 as Collier Heights Day. Similarly, Fulton County, Georgia, declared September 16, 2009, as Collier Heights day in the county. In 2008 under community association president, attorney Antavius Weems, Collier Heights began a quest to become the first community in the nation to be registered as a historic site, listed on the United States National Register of Historic Places. It is the first community in the nation built by African Americans for their fellow African Americans. On June 23, 2009, the community achieved the goal and in June 2013 it received local historic designation.

During the 2021 mayoral election cycle, it was notable that two of the top three mayoral candidates, Felicia Moore and Andre Dickens lived in Collier Heights.

== Education ==
=== Public ===
- Bazoline E. Usher Collier Heights Elementary School
- Harper-Archer Elementary School
- John Lewis Invictus Academy (6th–7th Grades)
- Douglass High School

=== Private ===
- Berean Academy; K–12; Yvonne Brown, Principal
- St. Paul of the Cross Christian Academy; K–12

=== Public libraries ===
- Atlanta–Fulton Public Library System operates the Adamsville–Collier Heights Branch.

== Transportation ==
Besides the main arterial road, Collier Drive, other roads include Waterford Road, Hamilton E. Holmes Rd, and it borders Donald Lee Hollowell Pkwy.

MARTA serves Collier Heights with the Hamilton E. Holmes transit station, which is the system's westernmost route.
