= Kathryn Johnson (journalist) =

American journalist (1926–2019)

- Born: May 18, 1926; Columbus, Georgia, United States
- Died: October 23, 2019 (aged 93); Atlanta, Georgia, United States

Kathryn Johnson (1926 – October 23, 2019) was an American journalist who covered the civil rights movement for the Associated Press.

Born in Columbus, Georgia, Johnson studied English at Agnes Scott College and took classes in journalism from Georgia State University. She applied to be a reporter at the Associated Press in the late 1940s, but was instead hired as a secretary. The organization eventually promoted her to reporter, in 1959, and Johnson found herself as the only woman reporter in their Atlanta bureau. Johnson was tasked with covering the American Civil Rights movement, including the desegregations of the University of Georgia and the University of Alabama. She also reported on the activities of Martin Luther King Jr., forming a close relationship with him and his wife. She later wrote about this time, including the aftermath of his assassination, in the book My Time with the Kings.

Johnson also reported on the Vietnam War, interviewing Jeremiah Denton and William Calley. She was presented with a Nieman Fellowship in 1976 and left the Associated Press in 1979, finding work as an associate editor for the U.S. News & World Report. She left there in 1988 and moved to Atlanta to care for her mother, then worked at CNN until her retirement in 1999.

== Early life and education ==
Kathryn Johnson, formerly known as Giannakopoulos, was born on May 18, 1926, in Columbus, Georgia, to a Greek immigrant father. Johnson was engaged to be married, but her fiancé died during World War II. Johnson studied English at Agnes Scott College in Decatur, Georgia, from which she graduated in 1947. She continued to study at Georgia State University, this time taking classes in journalism.

== Career ==
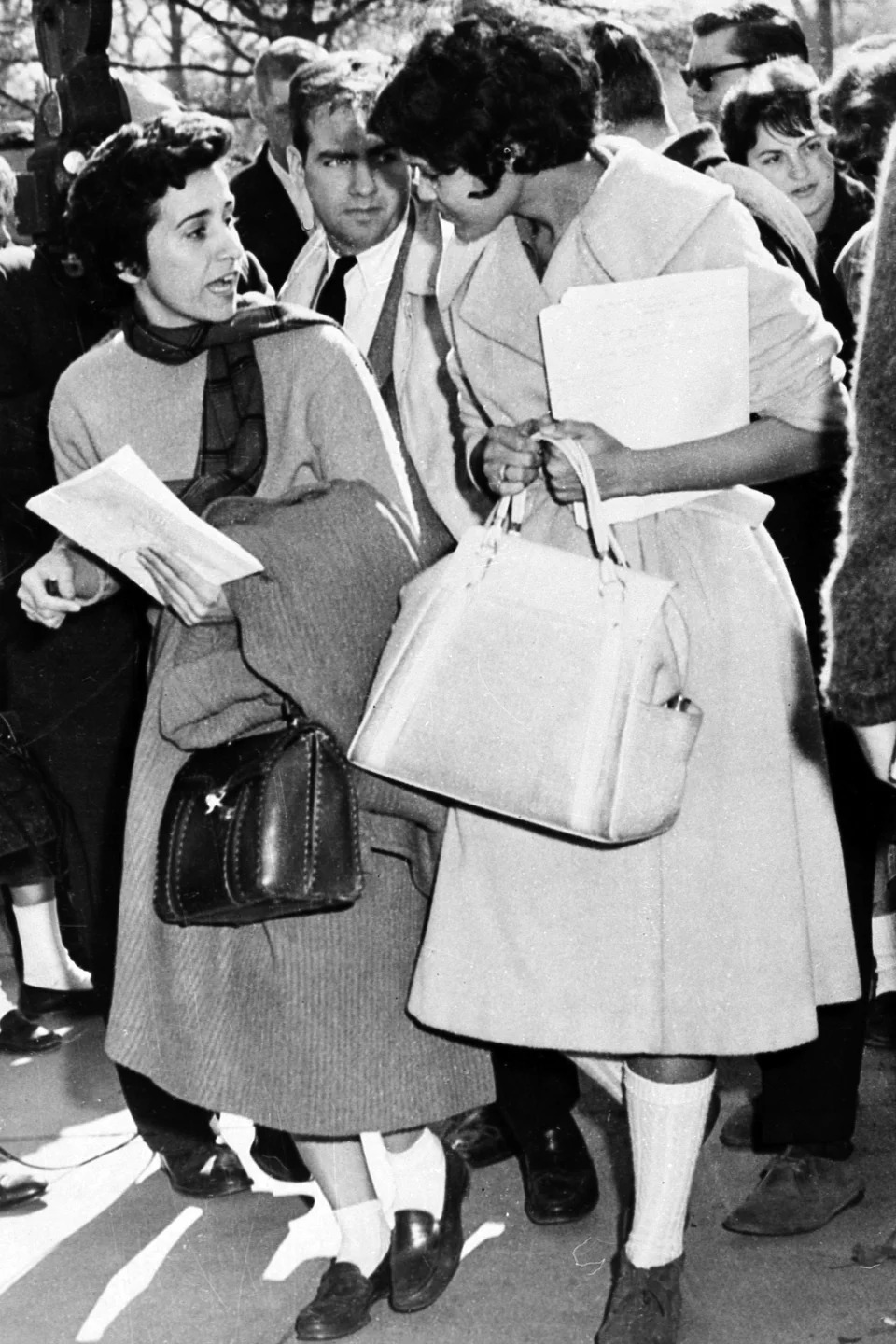
Johnson (left), disguised as a student, talking with Charlayne Hunter (right) on her first week of classes at the University of Georgia

Upon graduating from Agnes Scott, Johnson applied to be a reporter at the Associated Press; she was instead hired as a secretary. It wasn't until 1959 that she was promoted to the rank of "newsman", and only after intervention by the American Newspaper Guild. Working as the only woman reporter at their Atlanta Bureau, her editors were unhappy about this turn of affairs and assigned Johnson with the task of covering the activities of Martin Luther King Jr. during the civil rights movement, a task unpopular in the bureau and refused by other reporters. Johnson described her senior male colleagues in the bureau as "traditional Southerners" who "did not want to cover a black movement". In January 1961, she took advantage of her youthful appearance and disguised herself as a student to talk with Charlayne Hunter-Gault and sneak into her classes in Hunter-Gault's first week at the University of Georgia. That same week she also reported on the University of Georgia desegregation riot; her face and lungs were burnt by a tear gas bomb thrown at the Black student's dorms.

In 1963, she was present for another university desegregation, this time at the University of Alabama. Initially confined to a room with the other reporters, she told a guard she needed to use the restroom and slipped into the offices of Alabama governor George Wallace. She hid under a table and listened as Wallace talked with federal officials such as Nicholas Katzenbach. The following year, Johnson reported on the trial which acquitted the Klansmen responsible for the Murder of Lemuel Penn; she described being told to sit on the second story with the Black spectators and watch the proceedings from the balcony, while the white men were allowed downstairs.

Johnson became acquainted with the King family one night during the 1964–1965 Scripto strike. After a day spent covering the strike, Martin Luther King Jr. offered to walk her to her car. In turn, Johnson volunteered to drive him home. He and Coretta invited her inside, and she stayed talking to them until past one in the morning. She stayed in contact with the family after that day, especially Coretta, forming a relationship with them "exceeded the usual boundaries between reporters and sources".

Four years later, in 1968, Johnson heard of the assassination of Martin Luther King Jr. on the radio; she drove to the King's home where she was met by police. Johnson stated that she was initially prevented from going to the house by police, who said that reporters were not allowed inside; they were overruled by Coretta. Johnson was the only reporter allowed in the King home in the immediate aftermath of his assassination, where she remained for five days, cooking, watching the news with Coretta, and preparing to write about the assassination. She was invited by Andrew Young to fly on the plane taking King's body to his hometown of Atlanta, but was prevented by her agency. According to Johnson: "It was the biggest story of the time. Had I been a male, there is no question they would have let him get on."

In 1969, an interview Johnson had conducted with the wives of American prisoners of war in Vietnam was published; it was one of the Associated Press's most widely syndicated that year. One of the women she interviewed was Jane Maury Denton, wife of Jeremiah Denton. She maintained a relationship with the Denton family and, upon Jeremiah's release in 1973, she interviewed him and wrote a series of eight articles about his captivity and time in Vietnam. He reviewed the articles before she sent them to be published, as the pair had agreed upon. Denton was not the only American soldier Johnson interviewed; she reported on the hearings and did multiple interviews with William Calley during the 1970 – 1971 trial over his involvement in the My Lai massacre.

Johnson was given a fellowship by the Nieman Foundation for Journalism to study at Harvard from 1976 to 1977. She left the Associated Press in 1979 and, later that year, was hired as an associate editor by the U.S. News & World Report; she later became the chief of their Southeastern bureau. Johnson left in 1988, when she moved to Atlanta to take care of her mother, successfully seeking employment at the CNN offices there. She retired in 1999.

During her career, Johnson became known for building trust with her interview subjects, keeping in touch with them even after publishing her stories.

== My Time with the Kings ==
My Time with the Kings: A Reporter's Recollections of Martin, Coretta and the Civil Rights Movement
- Author: Kathryn Johnson
- Publisher: AP and Rosetta Books
- Publication date: 2016
- ISBN: 978-0-9990359-2-4
- OCLC: 1051773742

In 2016, the Associated Press and Rosetta Books published My Time with the Kings: A Reporter's Recollections of Martin, Coretta and the Civil Rights Movement, a book by Johnson, comprised in part from her original wire reports and chapters she had intended for a memoir: A review in Journalism & Mass Communication Quarterly, described the book as both an autobiography and a description of the King family in the immediate aftermath of Martin Luther King Jr.'s assassination. The review described her writing in a "vibrant", and in "spare reportorial AP style", which was engaging and gave the impression that Johnson was proud of the connections she had with the family, connections other reporters lacked. The reviewer noted Johnson's claims that she was the only white woman in the crowd at some marches, describing that as "a stretch of the truth" and disputing her description of King as mostly unknown when she was first assigned to report on him.

== Later years and death ==
In her later life, Johnson attended the Greek Orthodox Cathedral of the Annunciation in Atlanta. After her retirement, her work at the Associated Press was publicly acknowledged by the agency. "They’re treating me like a celebrity. They sure didn’t treat me like that when I worked for them."

Johnson died on October 23, 2019, at the age of 93, in Atlanta, Georgia.
