= Roy V. Harris =

American politician (1895–1985)

- Harris speaking before a Citizens' Council meeting

Speaker of the Georgia House of Representatives
- In office 1937–1940
- Preceded by: Eurith D. Rivers
- Succeeded by: Randall Evans Jr.
- In office 1943–1946
- Preceded by: Randall Evans Jr.
- Succeeded by: Frederick Barrow Hand

Personal details
- Born: Roy Vincent Harris; October 2, 1895 Glascock County, Georgia, United States
- Died: January 21, 1985 (aged 89)
- Party: Democratic
- Children: Roy Vincent Harris Jr.
- Education: University of Georgia; School of Law

Roy Vincent Harris (October 2, 1895 – January 21, 1985) was an American politician and newspaper publisher in the U.S. state of Georgia during the mid-1900s. From the 1920s until the 1940s, Harris served several terms in both the Georgia House of Representatives and the Georgia State Senate, and was twice the speaker of the house, from 1937 to 1940 and again from 1943 to 1946. Historian Harold Paulk Henderson has called Harris "one of Georgia's most capable behind-the-scenes politicians".

During his time in politics, Harris acquired a great deal of political power and was regarded as a "kingmaker" when it came to the governorship of Georgia, primarily using the state's unique county unit electoral system to help several individuals get elected to that position. Additionally, Harris was a supporter of public education in the state, serving as a regent for the University System of Georgia from the 1950s to the 1970s. However, he is arguably best remembered as an ardent supporter of racial segregation and white supremacy, and both as an elected official and a prominent citizen, Harris fought against school integration and opposed the larger civil rights movement.

== Early life ==
Roy Vincent Harris was born in Glascock County, Georgia, on October 2, 1895, to Elizabeth Allen and James Robert Harris. While a child, the family moved to Wrens, Georgia, where Harris attended high school. He later attended the University of Georgia (UGA) in Athens, Georgia, where he graduated with an undergraduate degree in 1917. Following this, he enlisted in the United States Army and within two years had risen through the ranks from a private to a first lieutenant. After his military service, he reenrolled at the university and attained a law degree in 1919.

== Political career ==
In 1921, Harris, who was living in Jefferson County, Georgia, was elected to the Georgia House of Representatives, a position he would hold until 1928. In 1931, Harris moved to Augusta, Georgia, and he was elected to the Georgia State Senate that same year. Two years later, Harris was elected back to the House, a position he would hold until losing reelection in 1946. During this tenure, he served as the speaker of the Georgia House of Representatives from 1937 to 1940 and again from 1943 to 1946.

=== Kingmaker ===
During his later tenure in the House, Harris acquired significant political power and became a noted kingmaker in Georgia politics, aiding in the gubernatorial election victories of Georgia Governors Ellis Arnall, Eugene Talmadge, Herman Talmadge, and Ernest Vandiver. Harris was adept at using Georgia's unique electoral system known as the county unit system to help ensure these candidates' victories. Between 1946 and 1947, Harris worked behind the scenes on behalf of Herman Talmadge during the three governors controversy, and he would again support Talmadge during the 1950 Georgia gubernatorial election. During Harris's time as a kingmaker, a popular saying among politicians in Georgia was, "What do you need to be elected governor in Georgia? Fifty thousand dollars and Roy Harris". Between 1936 and 1950, only one candidate for governor had been elected without Roy's support, and he had never backed a losing candidate for that position. In addition to helping gubernatorial candidates, Haris also used his power to pass certain pieces of legislation through the Georgia General Assembly.

=== Public education ===
Harris was also an advocate for improving public education in the state. In 1933, Harris used his connections with Governor Eugene Talmadge to keep the Georgia Medical College open, overturning a vote from the Board of Regents of the University System of Georgia (USG) to close it. Harris also supported his alma mater of UGA, which was also the state's flagship university, pushing the General Assembly to allocate more funds to the university to allow it to expand its campus and improve its educational standards, and he also secured funds for a new building at the Georgia Institute of Technology. In 1951, Governor Herman Talmadge appointed Harris to the USG Board of Regents, and he would serve on the board from 1951 to 1958 and again from 1960 to 1974. In 1965, he was placed on an advisory committee to oversee the University of Georgia School of Law.

=== Racial segregation ===
Both during and after his time as an elected official, Harris was an ardent supporter of racial segregation and opposed efforts at school integration and the civil rights movement, garnering the sobriquet of "Mr. Segregation". In 1946, Harris lost his reelection effort to the House of Representatives, which he blamed on increased African American voting in his district following the end of the state's white primary system. That same year, he founded the Augusta Courier, a tabloid newspaper that he edited from 1947 to 1974. He used the newspaper to promote segregation and white supremacy and to attack efforts at racial integration and liberalism in general. To the extent of the latter, he defended U.S. Senator Joseph McCarthy's anticommunist actions and attacked the Southern Regional Council, a civil rights organization, of being infiltrated by communists. Later, during the civil rights movement, Harris accused, among others, civil rights leader Martin Luther King Jr. of being a communist and attacked the desegregation efforts of activist Hosea Williams in Savannah, Georgia as similarly tied to communism. Harris also attacked other newspaper editors, such as the anti-segregationist publisher of The Atlanta Constitution Ralph McGill, who Harris stated should be drove "clean out of the state of Georgia". In 1953, Harris used the Courier to attack the pro-integration viewpoint of The Red & Black, UGA's student newspaper. Using his political connections, he was able to get a resolution introduced into the General Assembly that called for the removal of the pro-integration journalists, leading to their resignation shortly thereafter. Noted journalist Bill Shipp was among those involved. Additionally, as a member of the USG Board of Regents, Harris opposed the Georgia Tech Yellow Jackets' decision to participate in the 1956 Sugar Bowl, which was to be the first integrated college bowl game in the Deep South. During the 1950s, Harris became a member of the Citizens' Councils of America, a white supremacist, segregation organization that had been founded following the 1954 United States Supreme Court case Brown v. Board of Education, which resulted in public school segregation being declared unconstitutional. In addition to being a leader of the movement in Georgia, he also served as the president of the organization from 1958 to 1966. He was also a member of the similarly pro-segregationist States' Rights Council of Georgia.

In 1957, during the Little Rock Crisis regarding the integration of a high school in Little Rock, Arkansas, Harris and Georgia Governor Marvin Griffin traveled to Little Rock to meet with the governor of Arkansas in an effort to convince him to oppose the integration efforts. During their trip, they spoke to the local Citizens' Council organization and gave speeches promoting school segregation, helping to galvanize the segregationists in the state. During this same time, Harris fought efforts to integrate schools in Georgia. During the 1950s, along with several other noted conservative politicians, he was a member of the Georgia Commission on Education, a state-appointed commission to determine how to maintain the status quo of "separate but equal" schooling in the state. In 1961, following the University of Georgia desegregation riot, he applauded the students who had conducted the riot in an effort to stop the school from integrating. After the two African American students who had attempted to join the university (Hamilton E. Holmes and Charlayne Hunter) had been removed from the campus, Harris demanded a list containing the names of the 340 members of the UGA faculty who had signed a petition calling on the two students to be reinstated. He campaigned on behalf of segregationist Lester Maddox in the 1966 Georgia gubernatorial election, and in both the 1964 and 1968 presidential elections, he broke ranks with the Democratic Party, supporting conservative Republican Barry Goldwater in 1964 and former Alabama Governor George Wallace in 1968, serving on the latter's Georgia campaign committee. During the 1970s, Harris's views on race began to mellow, and in 1982, he became the city attorney for Ed McIntyre, the first African American mayor of Augusta, whom Harris had supported over a white opponent.

== Personal life ==
Harris was a Methodist and served for some time as a Sunday school teacher. During his time as an elected official, he also operated a law firm in Augusta. In 1935, Harris married Mary Lewis of Augusta. The couple had one child, a son named Roy Vincent Harris Jr., who would later become a noted aerospace engineer after graduating from Georgia Tech and working at NASA's Langley Research Center. Harris died on January 21, 1985, at the age of 89. Today, his papers are held at the Richard B. Russell Library for Political Research and Studies at the University of Georgia.

== Sources ==
- Bartley, Numan V. (1999). The Rise of Massive Resistance: Race and Politics in the South During the 1950's (Louisiana Paperback ed.). Baton Rouge: Louisiana State University Press. ISBN 978-0807124192.
- Brückmann, Rebecca (2021). Massive Resistance and Southern Womanhood: White Women, Class, and Segregation. Athens: University of Georgia Press. ISBN 978-0820358345.
- Coski, John M. (2006). The Confederate Battle Flag: America's Most Embattled Emblem (First Harvard University Press paperback ed.). Cambridge: Harvard University Press. ISBN 978-0674029866.
- Daniels, Maurice C. (2019). Ground Crew: The Fight to End Segregation at Georgia State. Athens: University of Georgia Press. ISBN 978-0820355962.
- Dubay, Robert W. (Spring 1995). "Politics, Pigmentation, and Pigskin: The Georgia Tech Sugar Bowl Controversy of 1955". Atlanta History. XXXIX (1). Atlanta History Center: 21–35.
- Hathorn, Billy Burton (Winter 1987–1988). "The Frustration of Opportunity: Georgia Republicans and the Election of 1966". Atlanta History. XXXI (4). Atlanta Historical Society: 37–52.
- Heale, M. J. (1998). McCarthy's Americans: Red Scare Politics in State and Nation, 1935–1965. London: Macmillan Press Ltd. ISBN 978-1349145461. Archived from the original on March 18, 2022.
- Henderson, Harold Paulk (1991). The Politics of Change in Georgia: A Political Biography of Ellis Arnall. Athens: University of Georgia Press. ISBN 978-0820313061.
- Henderson, Harold Paulk (2008). Ernest Vandiver, Governor of Georgia (Paperback ed.). Athens: University of Georgia Press. ISBN 978-0820330600.
- Huff, Christopher Allen (April 14, 2021) [June 28, 2007]. "Roy V. Harris". New Georgia Encyclopedia. Archived from the original on January 22, 2022.
- Katagiri, Yasuhiro (2014). Black Freedom, White Resistance, and Red Menace: Civil Rights and Anticommunism in the Jim Crow South. Baton Rouge: Louisiana State University Press. ISBN 978-0807153147.
- Kirby, Bill (March 26, 2021). "Kirby: When it came to success, Roy V. Harris was no junior partner". The Augusta Chronicle. Gannett. Archived from the original on April 22, 2021.
- Lawson, Steven F. (1999). Black Ballots: Voting Rights in the South, 1944–1969. Lanham, Maryland: Lexington Books. ISBN 0739100874.
- Newton, Michael (2014). White Robes and Burning Crosses: A History of the Ku Klux Klan from 1866. Jefferson, North Carolina: McFarland & Company. ISBN 978-1476617190.
- Peltason, J. W. (1971). Fifty-Eight Lonely Men: Southern Federal Judges and School Desegregation (Illini Books ed.). Urbana: University of Illinois Press. ISBN 978-0252001758.
- Roberts, Gene; Klibanoff, Hank (2007). The Race Beat: The Press, the Civil Rights Struggle, and the Awakening of a Nation (First Vintage Books ed.). New York: Vintage Books. ISBN 978-0307455949.
- Roche, Jeff (2010). Restructured Resistance: The Sibley Commission and the Politics of Desegregation in Georgia (Paperback ed.). Athens: University of Georgia Press. ISBN 978-0820338859.
- Stockley, Grif (2009). Ruled by Race: Black/White Relations in Arkansas From Slavery to the Present. Fayetteville: University of Arkansas Press. ISBN 978-1557288851.
- "Georgia: Pick the Winning Side". Time. Time Inc. June 26, 1950a. ISSN 0040-781X. Archived from the original on March 18, 2022.
- "Politics: Herman Again". Time. Time Inc. July 10, 1950b. ISSN 0040-781X. Archived from the original on March 18, 2022.
- Wood, Gwen Y. (1998). A Unique and Fortuitous Combination: An Administrative History of the University of Georgia School of Law. University of Georgia Law School Association. Athens, Georgia: University of Georgia Press. ISBN 978-0-8203-2082-3.
