= Marvin E. Moate =

American politician from Georgia (1910–1984)

65th Speaker of the Georgia House of Representatives
- In office 1955–1958
- Preceded by: Frederick Barrow Hand
- Succeeded by: George L. Smith

Member of the Georgia House of Representatives
- In office 1941–1945
- Preceded by: Harry Binion
- Succeeded by: John Chapman Lewis
- In office 1953–1958
- Preceded by: John Chapman Lewis

Member of the Georgia State Senate from the 20th district
- In office 1939–1941
- Preceded by: James Howard Ennis
- Succeeded by: Marvin LeGrande Gross
- In office 1945–1947
- Preceded by: Oscar Marion Ennis
- Succeeded by: Benjamin James Tarbutton
- In office 1951–1953
- Preceded by: William Barron Williams, Jr.
- Succeeded by: C. J. Lord

Personal details
- Born: September 22, 1910 Sparta, Hancock County, Georgia, U.S.
- Died: September 6, 1984 (aged 73) Sparta, Hancock County, Georgia, U.S.
- Party: Democratic
- Children: 2
- Education: Atlanta Law School

Marvin Edison Moate (September 22, 1910 – September 6, 1984) was an American politician who served in the Georgia House of Representatives and Georgia State Senate as a member of the democratic party. He also served as the 65th speaker of the house from 1955 to 1958.

== Early life ==
Marvin E. Moate was born in Sparta, Hancock County, Georgia on September 22, 1910, to Robert H. Moate (1872-1946) and Eula Smith (1882-1954). He graduated from the Atlanta Law School in 1932 and went on to practice law from 1932 to 1939. Afterwards he worked as a lumber manufacturer from 1939 to 1948.

He married Margaret Carroll (1915-2006) on December 27, 1942, in Cedartown, Georgia and went on to have two children: Marvin E. Jr. (1944) and Linda Carroll (1945).

== Political career ==
Marvin E. Moate was first elected as a member of the Georgia Senate for the 20th district in 1939. He served three different terms as a state senator for that district from 1939 to 1941, then again from 1945 to 1947 and finally from 1951 to 1953. In between his terms in the Georgia Senate, he was elected to the Georgia House of Representatives for Hancock county, serving from 1941 to 1945 and then again from 1953 to 1958. He was ultimately elected its speaker in 1955, holding the position until 1958 when he was succeeded by fellow democrat George L. Smith.

== Later life and death ==
Marvin E. Moate retired after his term as speaker ended and died on September 6, 1984. He was buried in Sparta Cemetery in Sparta, Hancock County, Georgia.

== See also ==
- List of speakers of the Georgia House of Representatives
- Georgia House of Representatives

Georgia State Senate
Preceded by James Howard Ennis	Member of the Georgia State Senate from the 20th district 1939-1941	Succeeded by Marvin LeGrande Gross
Preceded by Oscar Marion Ennis	Member of the Georgia State Senate from the 20th district 1945-1947	Succeeded by Benjamin James Tarbutton
Preceded by William Barron Williams, Jr.	Member of the Georgia State Senate from the 20th district 1951-1953	Succeeded by C. J. Lord
Georgia House of Representatives
Preceded by Harry Binion	Member of the Georgia House of Representatives for Hancock County; 1941–1945	Succeeded by John Chapman Lewis
Preceded by John Chapman Lewis	Member of the Georgia House of Representatives for Hancock County; 1953–1958	Succeeded by
Political offices
Preceded by Fred Hand	Speaker of the Georgia House of Representatives; 1955-1958	Succeeded by George L. Smith
