= Vernon Jordan =

American lawyer and civil rights activist (1935–2021)

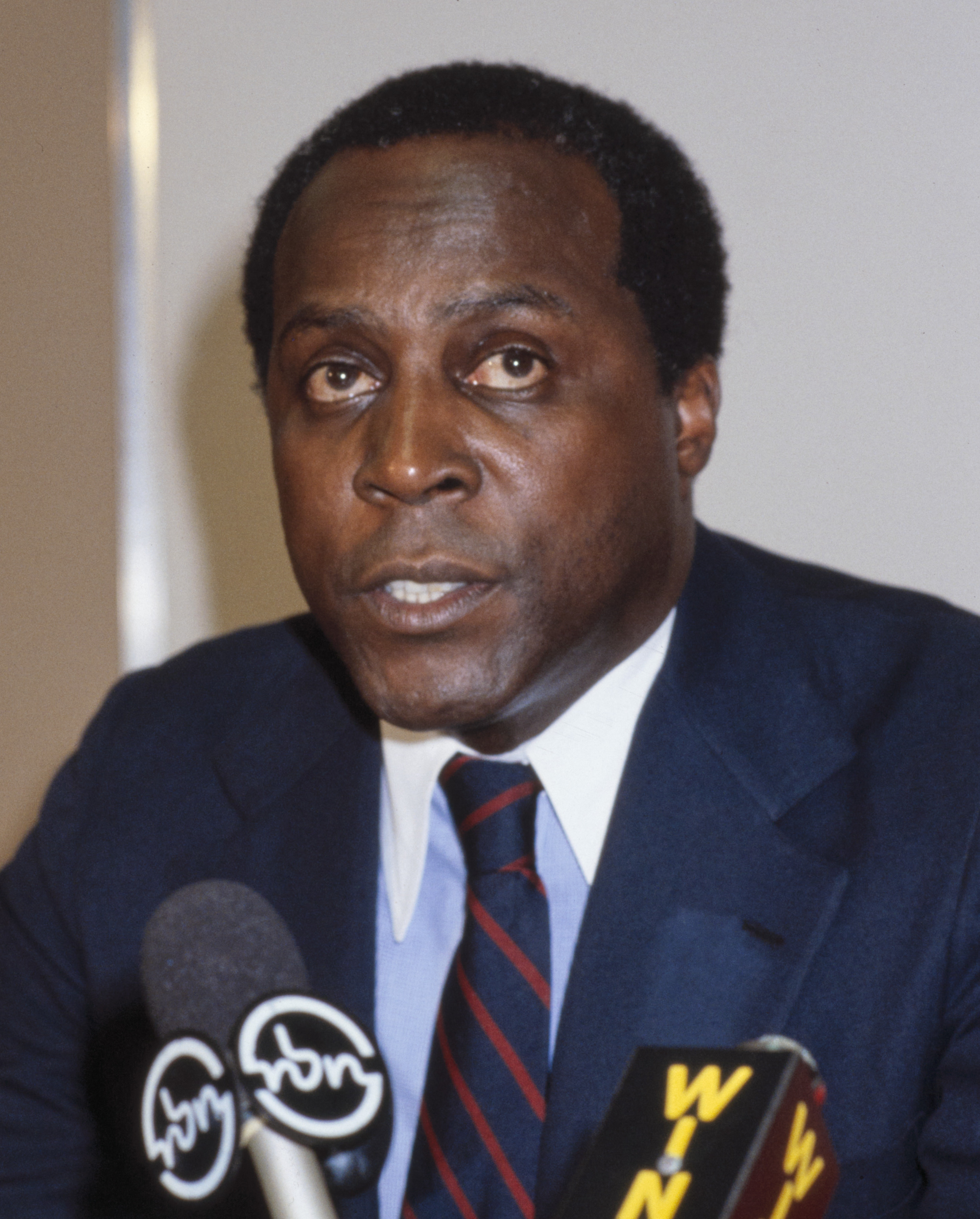
- Jordan in 1973
- Born: Vernon Eulion Jordan Jr. August 15, 1935; Atlanta, Georgia, U.S.
- Died: March 1, 2021 (aged 85); Washington, D.C., U.S.
- Education: DePauw University (BA); Howard University (JD)
- Occupations: Attorney; business executive; civil rights activist
- Years active: 1960–2021
- Spouses: Shirley Yarbrough (died 1985); Ann Dibble Cook (m. 1986)
- Children: 5 (1 with Yarbrough, 4 by marriage with Ann Cook)
- Relatives: The Mighty Hannibal (cousin)

Vernon Eulion Jordan Jr. (August 15, 1935 – March 1, 2021) was an American business executive and civil rights attorney who worked for various civil rights movement organizations before becoming a close advisor to President Bill Clinton. He survived a nearly fatal assassination attempt in 1980 at the hands of a white supremacist.

Jordan grew up in Atlanta, Georgia, and graduated in 1957 from DePauw University. In the early 1960s, he started his civil rights career, most notably being a part of a team of lawyers that desegregated the University of Georgia. He then continued to work for multiple civil rights organizations until the late 1980s, including president of the National Urban League. The target of a 1980 assassination attempt designed to start a race war, this attempt on his life happened to be the first story covered on the inaugural broadcast of CNN. In the early 1990s, he became a close ally and friend of Bill Clinton and he served as part of Clinton's transition team. After Clinton's departure, Jordan began working with multiple corporations and investment banking firms up until his death. During the 2004 election, he worked for John Kerry's campaign.

== Early life and education ==
Jordan was born on August 15, 1935, in Atlanta, Georgia, to Mary Belle (Griggs) and Vernon E. Jordan Sr. He had a brother, Windsor. He was a cousin of James Shaw, a musician who was professionally billed as The Mighty Hannibal.

Jordan grew up with his family in the racially segregated Southern United States. He was an honors graduate of David T. Howard High School. Rejected for a summer internship with an insurance company after his sophomore year in college because of his race, he earned money for college for a few summers by working as a chauffeur to former city mayor Robert Maddox, then a banker. Jordan graduated from DePauw University in Greencastle, Indiana, in 1957. In an oral history interview archived at the Louie B. Nunn Center for Oral History, an interview conducted in 1964 with Robert Penn Warren for the book Who Speaks for the Negro?, Jordan described his difficulties at DePauw as the only black student in a class of 400. He earned a Juris Doctor at Howard University School of Law in 1960. He was a member of the Omega Psi Phi and Sigma Pi Phi fraternities.

== Legal career and activism ==
Jordan returned to Atlanta to join the law office of Donald L. Hollowell, a civil rights activist. The firm, including Constance Motley, sued the University of Georgia for racial discrimination in its admission policies. The suit ended in 1961 with a Federal Court order demanding the admission of two African Americans, Charlayne Hunter and Hamilton E. Holmes. Jordan personally escorted Hunter past a group of angry white protesters to the university admissions office.

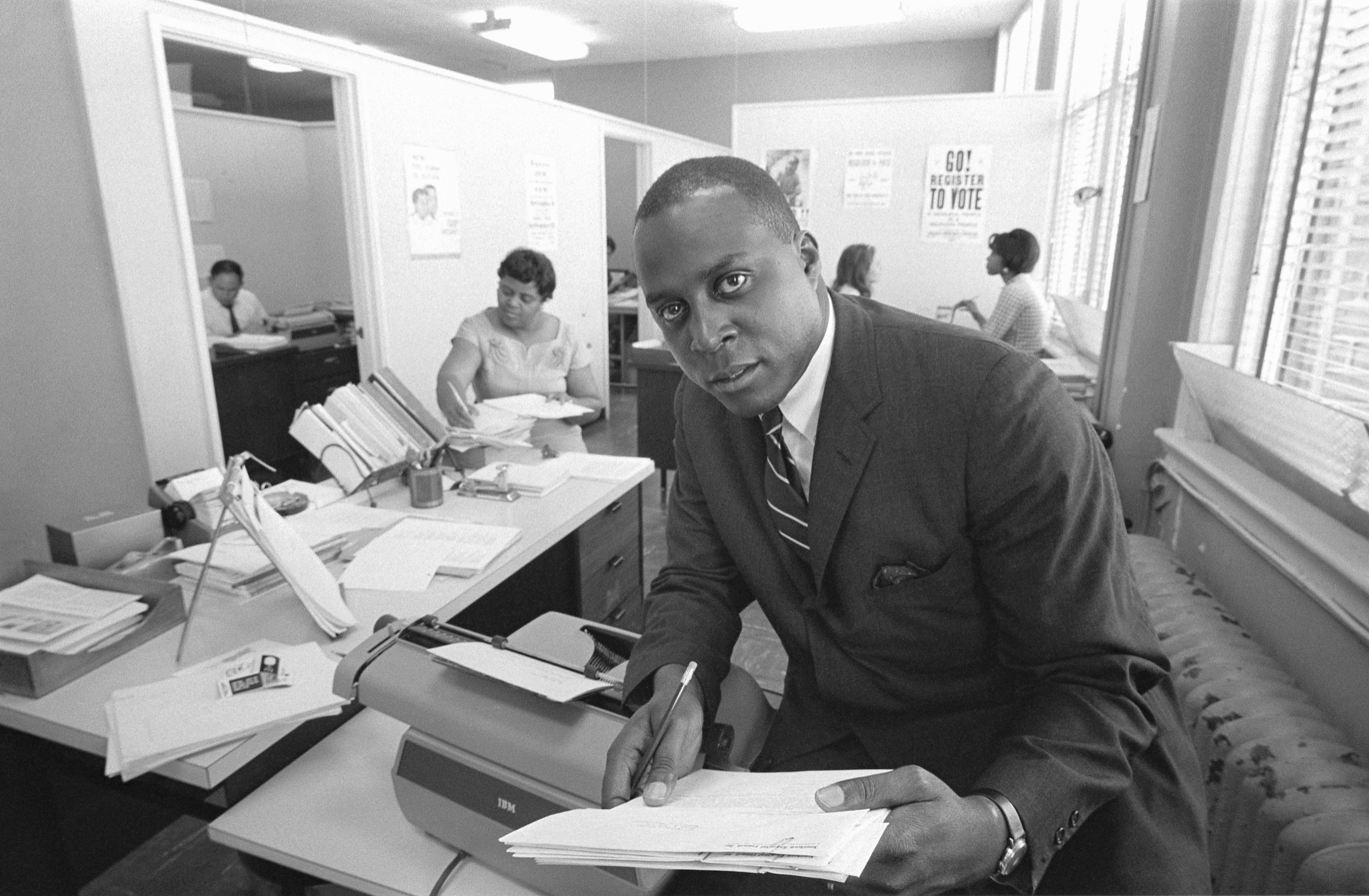
Jordan working on a voter education project in 1967.

After leaving private law practice in the early 1960s, Jordan became directly involved in activism in the field, serving as the Georgia field director for the National Association for the Advancement of Colored People. From the NAACP, he moved to the Southern Regional Council and then to the Voter Education Project.

In 1970, Jordan became executive director of the United Negro College Fund. He was president of the National Urban League from 1971 to 1981.

While still with the National Urban League, Jordan in 1981 said of the Ronald Reagan administration:

I do not challenge the conservatism of this administration. I do challenge its failure to exhibit a compassionate conservatism that adapts itself to the realities of a society ridden by class and race distinction.

That year he resigned from the National Urban League to take a position as legal counsel with the Washington, D.C., office of the Dallas law firm of Akin Gump Strauss Hauer & Feld.

== Assassination attempt ==
On May 29, 1980, Jordan was shot and seriously wounded outside the Marriott Inn in Fort Wayne, Indiana. He was accompanied by Martha Coleman at the time. Police thought initially that it might have been a domestic incident related to Coleman's life.

Then-president Jimmy Carter visited Jordan while he was recovering, an event that became the first story covered by the new network CNN.

Terrorist and neo-Nazi Joseph Paul Franklin was charged with attempted murder but acquitted in 1982. However, in 1996, after being convicted of murder in another case, Franklin admitted to having committed the shooting.

== Clinton administration ==
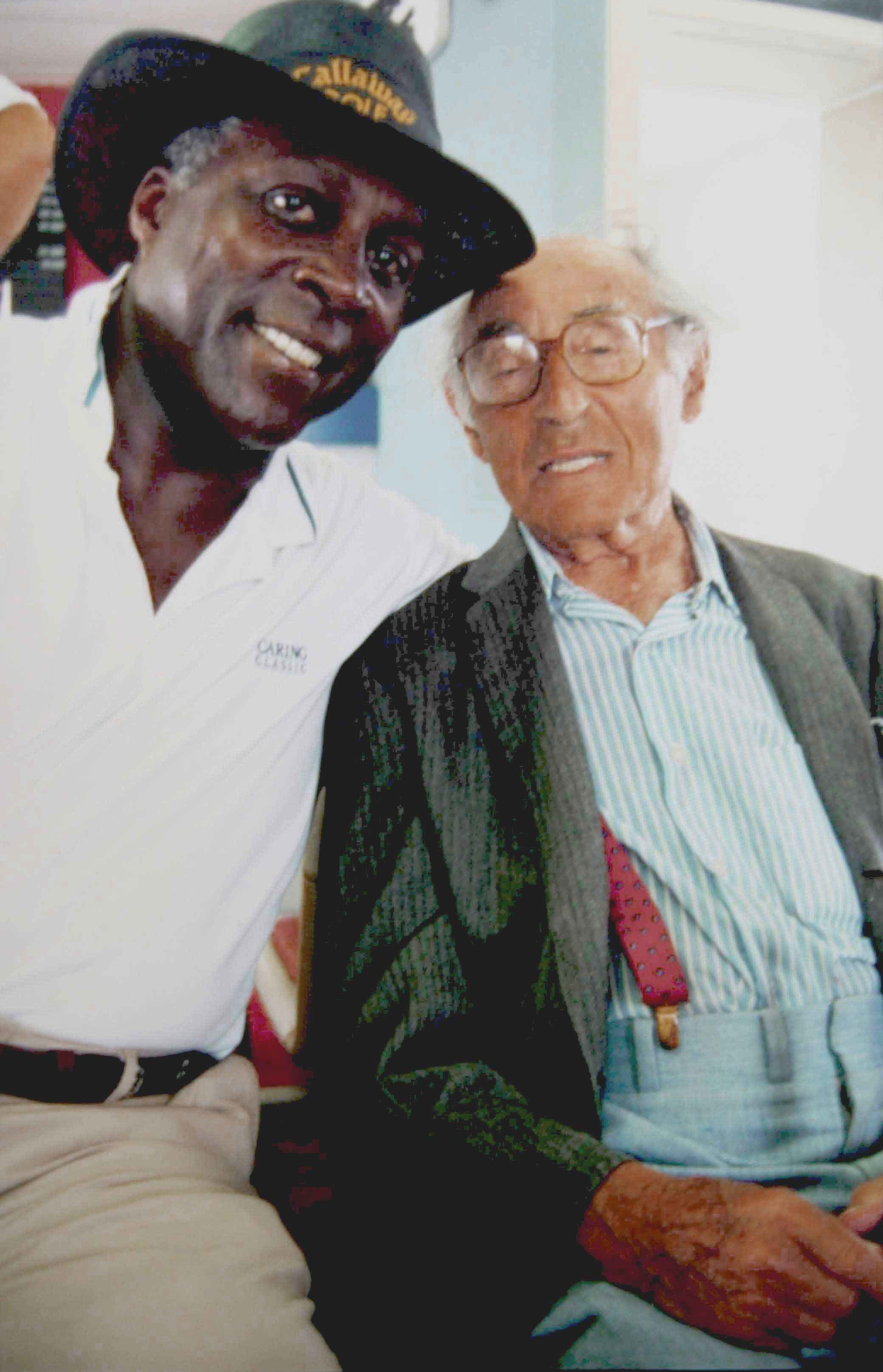
Vernon Jordan shares conversation with famed photographer Alfred Eisenstaedt. At the time, Jordan was visiting President Clinton on the island of Martha's Vineyard.

Jordan, a friend and political adviser to Bill Clinton, served as part of Clinton's transition team in 1992–1993, shortly after Clinton was elected president. In the words of The New York Times:

For Mr. Clinton, Mr. Jordan's roles have been manifold: Golfing companion. Smoother of ruffled feathers (he put the president back in touch with Zoë Baird after the withdrawal of her nomination to be attorney general). Consoler in chief (after Mr. Clinton was defeated for re-election as governor in 1980, after the suicide of Vincent W. Foster Jr. in 1993). Conduit to the high and mighty (he took Mr. Clinton in 1991 to the Bilderberg conference in Germany, an exclusive annual retreat for politicians and businessmen). Go-between (he told Mike Espy he had to go as secretary of agriculture, helped win Warren Christopher a larger role as secretary of state and sounded out Gen. Colin L. Powell for a Cabinet job).

In 1998 Jordan helped Monica Lewinsky, a former White House intern, find a job after she left the White House, and recommended an attorney. His role was considered controversial given the scandal that the Clinton administration had suffered because of the president's involvement with the intern, and Jordan testified several times before the grand jury convened by independent counsel Kenneth Starr. On October 1, 2003, a United States court of appeals rejected Jordan's claim for reimbursement for legal services related to assisting Clinton in scandals regarding Lewinsky and Paula Jones. Jordan asked the government to pay him $302,719, but he was paid only $1,215.

In 1998, Jordan was interviewed by CBS news television program 60 Minutes.

In the impeachment trial of Bill Clinton, Jordan was one of three individuals (with Lewinsky and Sidney Blumenthal) of whom House impeachment managers recorded a deposition.

== Later activities and death ==
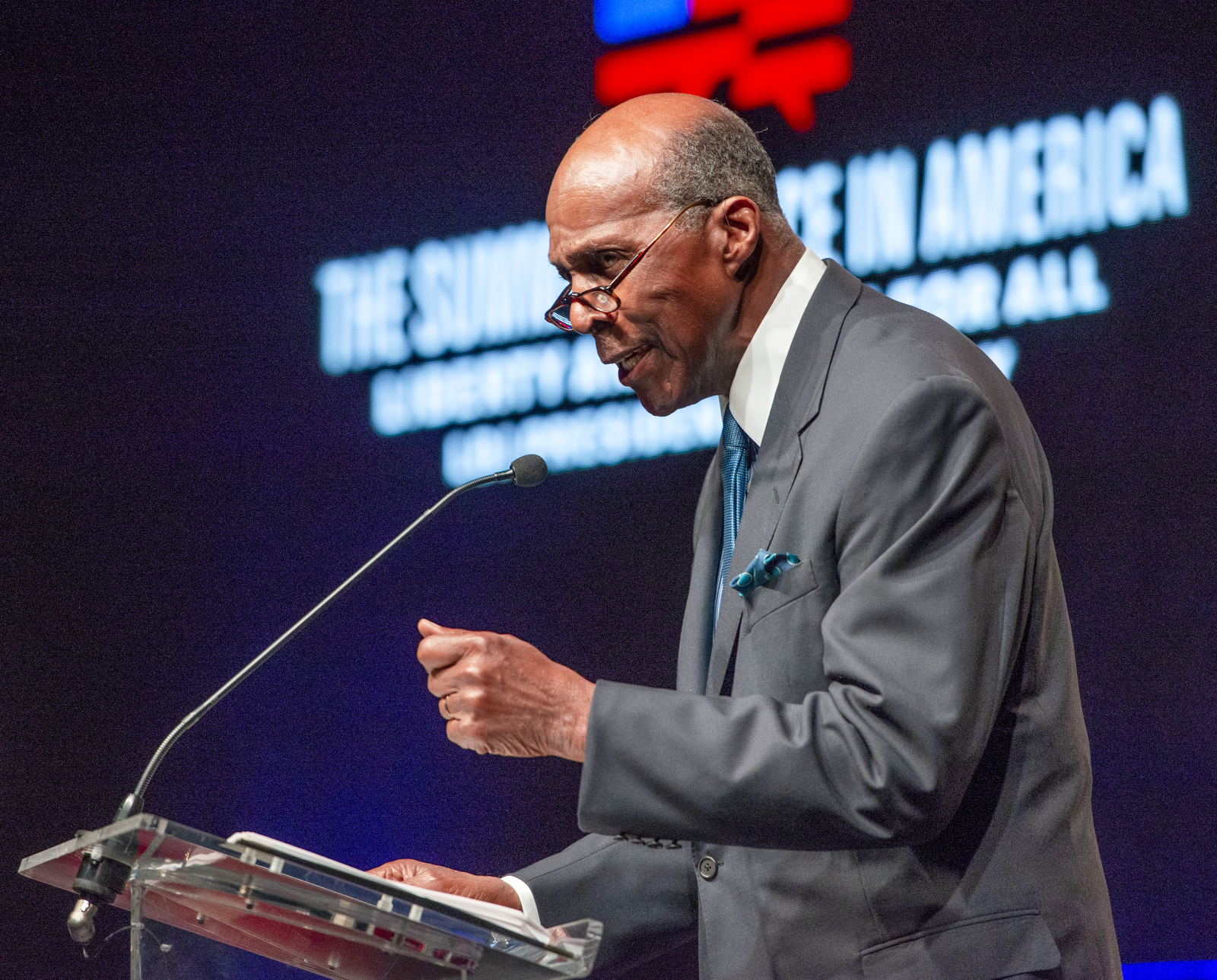
Jordan at the LBJ Presidential Library in 2019.

From January 2000 on, Jordan was a senior managing director with Lazard Freres & Co. LLC, an investment banking firm. He was also a member of the board of directors of multiple corporations, including American Express, J.C. Penney Corporation, Asbury Automotive Group, and the Dow Jones & Company.

He was a member of the board of directors of Revlon, Sara Lee, Corning, Xerox, and RJR Nabisco during the 1989 leveraged buyout fight between RJR Nabisco CEO F. Ross Johnson and Henry R. Kravis and his company KKR. A close friend of Jordan's was the Xerox tycoon Charles Peter McColough, who persuaded Jordan to join the board of trustees at Xerox. McColough served as a mentor and friend of Jordan's until McColough's death.

In the 2004 presidential campaign, Jordan led debate preparation and negotiation efforts on behalf of John Kerry, the Democratic nominee for president. That year he was elected president of The Economic Club of Washington, D.C.

In 2006, Jordan served as a member of the Iraq Study Group, which was formed to make recommendations on U.S. policy in Iraq.

In May 2017, Jordan served as the commencement speaker at the 163rd commencement of Syracuse University.

Jordan died at his home in Washington, D.C., on March 1, 2021, at the age of 85, and was buried in Washington, D.C.'s Oak Hill Cemetery.

== Marriage and family ==
Jordan married Shirley (née Yarbrough), who died in 1985. They have a daughter, Vickee Jordan Adams, who has worked in public and media relations for Wells Fargo and FGS Global.

In 1986 he remarried, to Ann Dibble Jordan and adopted her four children - Antoinette "Toni", Mercer, Janice and Jacqueline. He has nine grandchildren, seven from his second wife's children, Janice, Mercer, and Toni.

== Publications ==
External videos
- Booknotes interview with Jordan on Vernon Can Read! A Memoir, December 23, 2001, C-SPAN
- Presentation by Jordan on Make It Plain, June 28, 2008, C-SPAN
- Presentation by Jordan on Make It Plain, November 16, 2008, C-SPAN

- His memoir, Vernon Can Read! (2001), covered his life through the 1980s, and was written with historian and legal scholar Annette Gordon-Reed.
- A collection of his public speeches, with commentary, called Make It Plain: Standing Up and Speaking Out (2008)

Jordan also served as the narrator for American composer Joseph Schwantner's New Morning for the World: "Daybreak of Freedom," a collection of quotations from various speeches by Martin Luther King Jr.

== Legacy and honors ==
- Jordan was a life member of the Council on Foreign Relations and a member of the Bilderberg Group.
- 1983, Barnard College awarded Jordan its highest honor, the Barnard Medal of Distinction.
- 2001, he was awarded the Spingarn Medal by the NAACP for lifetime achievement.
- 2001 – his memoir won the Best Nonfiction Book for 2001 from the Black Caucus of the American Library Association. In 2002 it won an Anisfield-Wolf Book Award and a Trailblazer Award from the Metropolitan Black Bar Association.
- Jordan was honored as The New Jewish Home's Eight over Eighty Gala 2017 honoree.
- Howard University School of Law's library was named in his honor after his death in March 2021.
