= List of speakers of the Georgia House of Representatives =

== List of speakers ==
Speaker	Party	Start of service	End of service
Noble Wimberly Jones	Whig	1777	May 2, 1778
James Whitefield	Whig	May 2, 1778	October 30, 1778
Noble Wimberly Jones	Whig	October 30, 1778	November 15, 1778
**no quorum**		1779	1779
William Glascock	Whig	1780	1780
Nathan Brownson		1781	1781
William Gibbons, Sr.		1782	1782
Samuel Saltus		1782	1782
Joseph Clay	Federalist	1782 1st Adjournment	1782 1st Adjournment
Joseph Habersham	Independent	1782 2nd Adjournment	1782 3rd Adjournment
John Houstoun	Whig	1783	1783: retired after "several days"
Noble Wimberly Jones	Whig	1783	1783 1st Session
William Gibbons, Sr.		1783 2nd Session	1783 2nd Session
James Habersham, Jr.		1784	1784
Joseph Habersham	Independent	1785	1785
William Gibbons, Sr.		1786	1787
Nathan Brownson		1788	1788 2nd Session
John Powell		1789	1789
Seaborn Jones		1789	1790
William Gibbons		1791	1793
Thomas Napier		1794	1795
Thomas Stevens		1796	1796
David Meriwether	Democratic-Republican	1797	1801
Abraham Jackson		1802	1805
Benjamin Whitaker		1806	1810
Robert Iverson		1811	1811
Benjamin Whitaker		1812	1818
David Adams|		1819	1820
David Witt		1821	1821
David Adams		1821	1821
Allen Daniel Jr.		1822	1822
David Adams		1823	1823
John Abercrombie		1824	1825
Thomas W. Murray	Democratic-Republican	1825	1825
Irby Hudson		1826	1828
Warren Jourdan		1829	1829
Asbury Hull	Democratic	1830	1832
Thomas Glascock		1833	1834
Joseph Day	Democratic	1836	1839
Charles J. Jenkins	Democrat	1840	1840
William B. Wofford		1841	1842
Charles J. Jenkins	Whig	1843	1848
John W. Anderson	Democrat	1849	1850
James Archibald Meriwether	Democrat	1851	1852
John Elliott Ward	Democrat	1853	1854
William Henry Stiles	Democrat	1855	1856
John H.W. Underwood	Democrat	1857	1858
Isaiah Tucker Irvin	Democrat	1859	1859
Charles J. Williams	Democrat	1860	1860
Warren Akin Sr.	Democrat	1861	1863 Extraordinary Session
Thomas Hardeman, Jr.	Democrat	1863	1866 Extraordinary Session
Robert McWhorter	Republican	1868	1870 Extraordinary Session
James Milton Smith	Democrat	1871	1871
Joseph B. Cumming	Democrat	1872	1873 Late Adjournment
Augustus Octavius Bacon	Democrat	1873	1874
Thomas Hardeman, Jr.	Democrat	1875	1876
Augustus Octavius Bacon	Democrat	1877	1881 Late Adjournment
Louis F. Garrard	Democrat	1882	1883 Extraordinary Session
William A. Little	Democrat	1884	1887 Late Adjournment
Alexander S. Clay	Democratic	1888	1889 Late Adjournment
Clark Howell	Democratic	1890	1891 Late Adjournment
William Yates Atkinson	Democratic	1892	1893
William H. Fleming	Democratic	1894	1895
Hudson A. Jenkins	Democrat	1896	1897 Late Adjournment
John D. Little	Democrat	1898	1901
Newton Morris	Democratic	1902	1904
John M. Slaton	Democratic	1905	1908 Extraordinary Session
John N. Holder	Democratic	1909	1912 Extraordinary Session
William H. Burwell	Democratic	1913	1917 Extraordinary Session
John N. Holder	Democratic	1917	1920
William Cecil Neill	Democrat	1921	1926 2nd Extraordinary Session
Richard Russell Jr.	Democratic	1927	1931 Extraordinary Session
Arlie Daniel Tucker	Democratic	1931	1932
Eurith Dickerson Rivers	Democratic	1933	1936
Roy V. Harris	Democratic	1937	1940 Extraordinary Session
Randall Evans, Jr.	Democratic	1941 Extraordinary Session	1942
Roy V. Harris	Democratic	1943	1946 Extraordinary Session
Frederick Barrow Hand	Democratic	1947	1954
Marvin E. Moate	Democratic	1955	1958
George L. Smith	Democratic	1959	1962 Extraordinary Session
George T. Smith	Democratic	1963	1966
George L. Smith	Democratic	1967	1972
Thomas B. Murphy	Democratic	1973	2002
Terry Coleman	Democratic	2003	2005
Glenn Richardson	Republican	2005	2010 (January 1)
Mark Burkhalter	Republican	2010 Interim Speaker	2010
David Ralston	Republican	2010 (January 11)	2022
Jan Jones	Republican	2022 (November 16)	2023
Jon G. Burns	Republican	2023 (January 9)	

== See also ==
- List of minority leaders of the Georgia House of Representatives
- List of minority leaders of the Georgia State Senate
- List of presidents of the Georgia State Senate
- List of Georgia state legislatures
