= Ann Jordan =

American businesswoman (born 1934)

Ann Dibble Jordan
- Born: Ann Dibble; August 13, 1934 (age 92); Tuskegee, Alabama, U.S.
- Education: Vassar College (BA); University of Chicago (MA)
- Spouse: Vernon Jordan (1986–2021)
- Children: 5

Ann Dibble Jordan (née Dibble; born August 13, 1934) is an American company director and former social worker.

== Social work ==
Jordan is secretary of the board for Sasha Bruce Youthwork. She was an associate professor at the School of Social Service Administration of the University of Chicago from 1970 to 1987, director of social services at Chicago Lying-in Hospital from 1970 to 1985, and director of the Department of Social Services for the University of Chicago Medical Center from 1986 to 1987.

== Business ==
Jordan is vice chairman and secretary of WETA-TV, and an honorary trustee of the University of Chicago and The Brookings Institution in Washington, D.C. She is the former chairman of the National Symphony Orchestra, and a former trustee of the Memorial Sloan-Kettering Cancer Center.

She was the field work director of Citigroup from 1989 to 2007. She is a former director of Revlon, Inc., Johnson & Johnson, Automatic Data Processing, Coleman Company, Salant Corp., Travelers Group Inc. and The Phillips Collection. She was a recipient of the American Woman Award from the Women's Research & Education Institute in 2004.

== Politics ==
With her husband, she organized a Democratic fundraiser in 1994 that raised $3 million. She co-chaired President Bill Clinton's Inauguration Committee in 1996.

In 2004, she was one of the five-member board of directors of the Clinton Foundation.

== Personal life ==
She married Vernon Jordan in 1986, and has five children and nine grandchildren. She is a member of The Links.
