= Tom Linder (politician) =

American politician

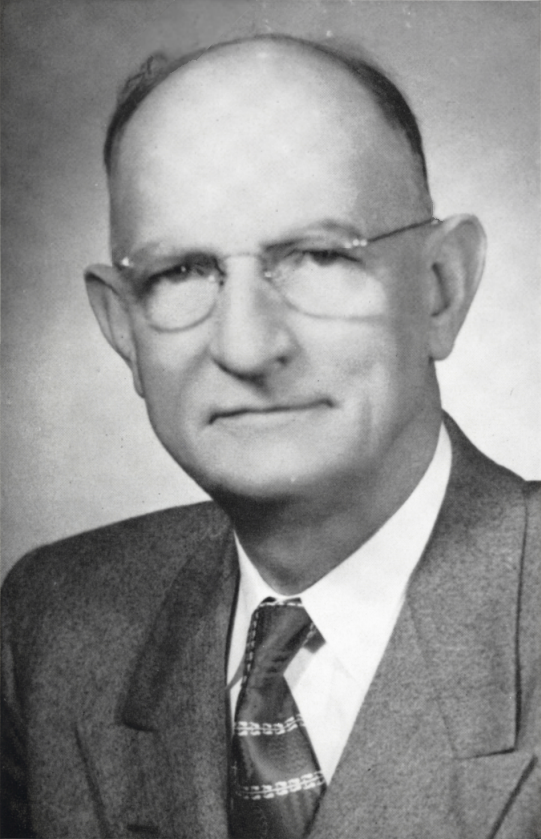
Tom Linder

Thomas Mercer Linder was the former Georgia Commissioner of Agriculture who ran for Governor of Georgia in 1954. He was a member of the Democratic Party.
