= Charlie Gowen =

Georgia State Representative

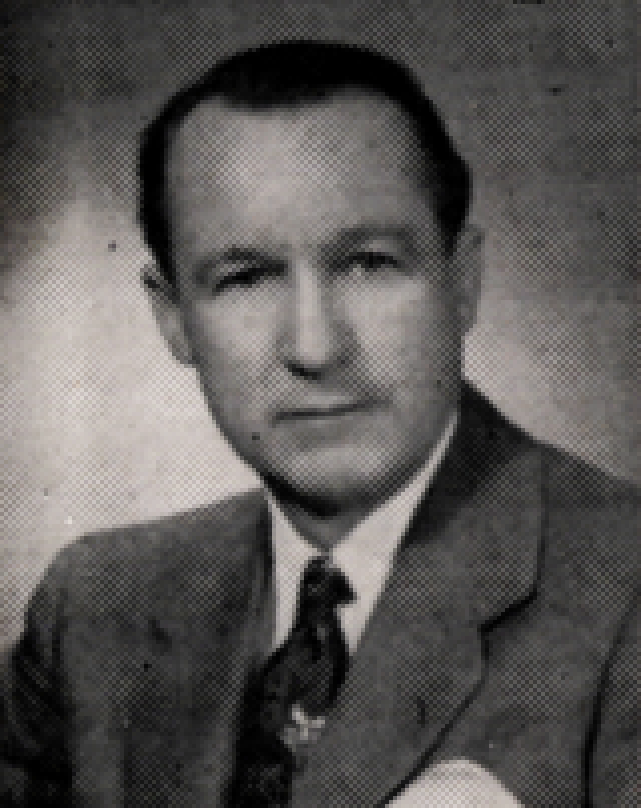
Charlie Gowen

Charlie Gowen (1904-2003) was a Georgia State Representative who served from 1939 to 1961. He ran for Governor of Georgia in 1954 and was a member of the Democratic Party. He was a strong opponent of the Talmadge machine in Georgia Democratic Party during the 1940s and 1950s. He died in 2003 at the age of 99.
