= Donald L. Hollowell =

American lawyer

Donald Hollowell
- Born: Donald Lee Hollowell; December 19, 1917; Wichita, Kansas, U.S.
- Died: December 27, 2004 (aged 87); Atlanta, Georgia, U.S.
- Education: Lane College (BA); Loyola University Chicago (LLB)
- Occupation: Lawyer
- Movement: Civil Rights Movement

Donald Lee Hollowell (December 19, 1917 – December 27, 2004) was an American civil rights attorney during the Civil Rights Movement, in the state of Georgia. He successfully sued to integrate Atlanta's public schools, Georgia colleges, universities and public transit, freed Martin Luther King Jr. from prison, and mentored civil rights attorneys (including Vernon Jordan and Horace Ward). The first black regional director of a federal agency (the EEOC), Hollowell is best remembered for his instrumental role in winning the desegregation of the University of Georgia in 1961. He is the subject of a 2010 documentary film, Donald L. Hollowell: Foot Soldier for Equal Justice.

== Biography ==
=== Early years ===
Donald Hollowell was born in Wichita, Kansas, and spent much of his childhood in Eureka, Kansas. He earned a high school diploma while serving six years in the U.S. Army's 10th Cavalry Regiment (the original Buffalo Soldier regiment). Although in Kansas and therefore not subject to the racist Jim Crow laws of the South, he faced blatant racism and discrimination while serving in the U.S. Army during World War II. Hollowell recounted that "army officials relegated him to eating in the kitchen, sleeping in quarters adjacent to prisoners, and patronizing Jim Crow canteens." Hollowell's experiences with racial segregation and discrimination and his involvement with the Southern Negro Youth Congress after the war inspired him to pursue the study of law to help in the fight for social justice. In 1947, Hollowell graduated magna cum laude from Lane College in Jackson, Tennessee, and he earned his law degree from Loyola University Chicago School of Law in 1951.

=== Legal career ===
In 1952, Hollowell set up a law practice in Atlanta, Georgia, where he began to play a major role in the burgeoning civil rights struggle.

Hollowell became well known for fighting racial segregation in the State of Georgia. Hollowell sued the University of Georgia, charging the institution with racist admission policies. The suit ended in 1961 with a federal court order demanding the admission of two African-American students, Charlayne Hunter and Hamilton E. Holmes.

In 1960, Hollowell and co-counsel Horace Ward won a victory in the Georgia Court of Appeals which secured the release of Martin Luther King Jr. from the Georgia State Prison. In another case, Hollowell and members of his firm prevented the execution of a 15-year-old black youth from Monticello, Georgia five days before it was scheduled to take place. Hollowell and civil rights champion C. B. King also defended Dr. King and hundreds of civil rights activists in the historic civil rights campaign in Albany, Georgia known as the Albany Movement.

In 1966, President Lyndon B. Johnson appointed Hollowell as regional director of the Equal Employment Opportunity Commission (EEOC), a government agency that monitors workplace discrimination. This appointment made Hollowell the first black regional director of a major federal agency. He remained with the EEOC for nearly 20 years. He also served as president of the Voter Education Project, where he helped increase the number of African-American voters from 3 million to 5.5 million.

In 2002, the University of Georgia awarded Hollowell its honorary Doctor of Laws degree.

=== Personal ===
Hollowell was a dedicated member of Kappa Alpha Psi fraternity. In 1968, he received the Fraternity's highest honor, the Laurel Wreath Award, for his work in civil rights.

Hollowell was married to Louise T. Hollowell, a magna cum laude graduate of Morris Brown College and a distinguished Professor of English (Emeritus) at Morris Brown. In 1997, Louise Hollowell and Martin Lehfeldt authored a book titled The Sacred Call: A Tribute to Donald L. Hollowell—Civil Rights Champion, which chronicles Hollowell's service and achievements. The book also tells the love story of Donald and Louise Hollowell, who celebrated their 61st wedding anniversary in 2004.

Attorney and Mrs. Hollowell had no children, but were the godparents to Dr. Albert J. H. Sloan, II, past President of Miles College (HBCU) outside of Birmingham, Alabama.

=== Death and legacy ===
Hollowell died on December 27, 2004, eight days after his 87th birthday, of heart failure.

To honor him, the City of Atlanta renamed Bankhead Highway (U.S. 78) in his honor; Emory University named a professorship in his honor, as well. Hollowell is the subject of a 2010 documentary film, Donald L. Hollowell: Foot Soldier for Equal Justice, and a full-length biography published in 2013 by University of Georgia Press.
