= William Gibbons (American politician) =

American politician

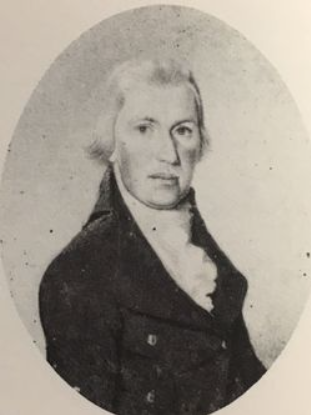
William Gibbons

William Gibbons (April 8, 1726 – September 27, 1800) was an American lawyer and revolutionary from Georgia. He was born at Bear Bluff, South Carolina, April 8, 1726; studied law in Charleston, SC; was admitted to the bar and practiced in Savannah, Georgia; member of the colonial assembly 1760–1762; joined the Sons of Liberty in 1774, and on May 11, 1775, was one of the party that broke open the magazine in Savannah and removed 600 pounds of the King's powder; delegate to the Provincial Congress of July 1775, and was chosen a member of the committee of safety on December 11, 1775; member of the executive council 1777–1781; associate justice of Chatham County in 1781 and 1782; Member of the Continental Congress in 1784; member of the State house of representatives in 1783, 1785–1789, and 1791–1793, and served as speaker in 1783, 1786, and 1787; president of the State constitutional convention in 1789; justice of the inferior court of Chatham County 1790–1792; died in Savannah, Georgia, September 27, 1800; interment probably in Colonial Park, formerly called the Old Cemetery, or Christ Church Cemetery.

== See also ==
- List of speakers of the Georgia House of Representatives
