= George L. Smith State Park =

Park in Emanuel County, Georgia, US

Coordinates: 32.562°N 82.113°W

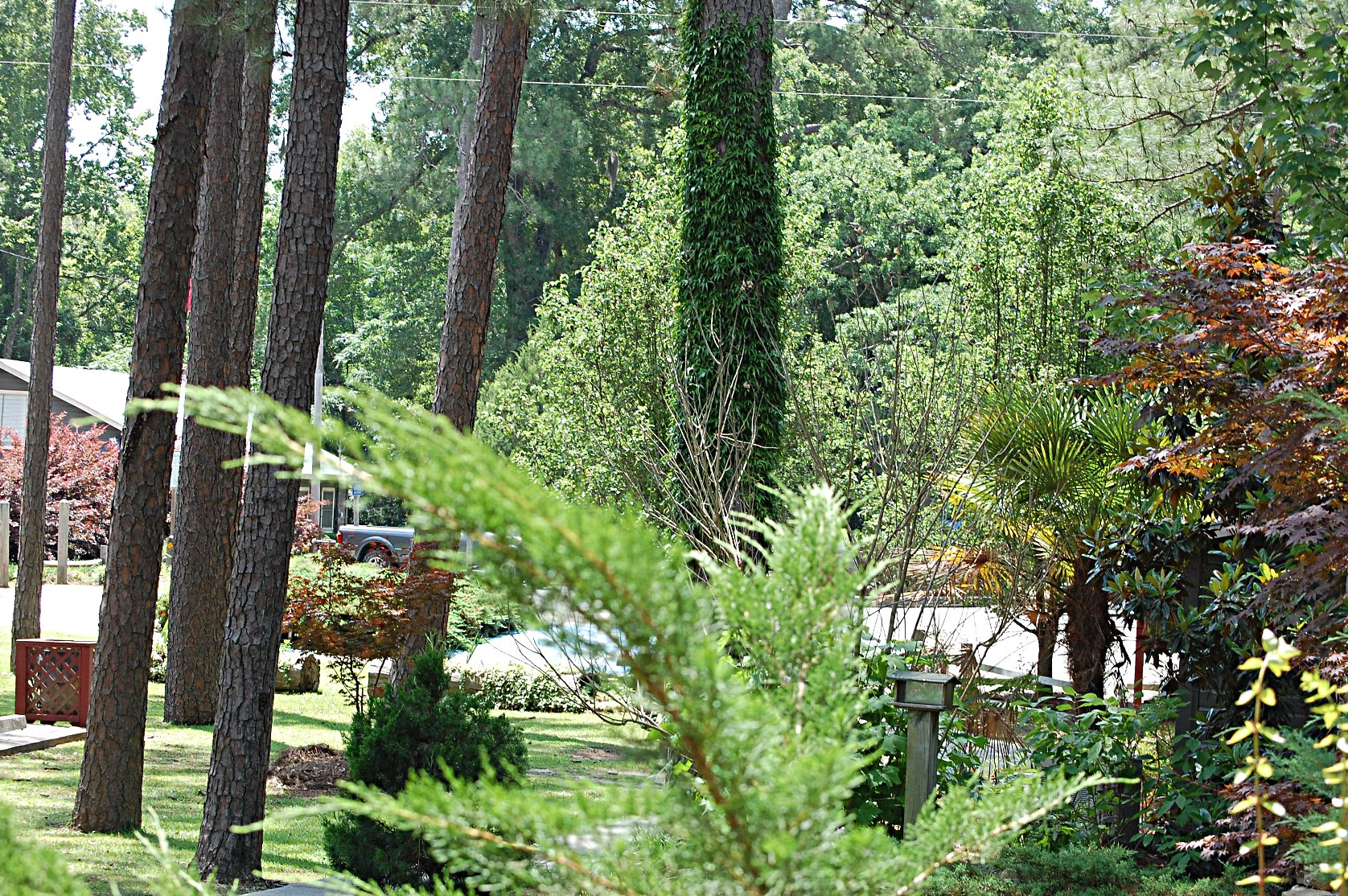
- Entrance to the George L. Smith state park
- Location: Emanuel County, Georgia
- Nearest city: Twin City, Georgia
- Area: 412-acre (1.67 km^{2})

George L. Smith State Park is a 1,634-acre (6.61 km^{2}) Georgia state park located in Emanuel County. The park is named after George L. Smith, a former speaker of the Georgia House of Representatives and Emanuel County native. Attractions include a grist mill, covered bridge, and the dam of the Parrish Mill (built 1880). The park's location on a 412-acre (1.67 km^{2}) mill pond dotted with many cypress trees makes it a destination for anglers and canoeists. The moderately-sized state park is in a remote location, making it an attraction for bird watchers and naturalists. Rare birds in residence include the great blue heron and the white ibis.

The lake/dam and mill host a museum documenting the history of the site, along with selected artifacts from the old grist mill, as well as educational materials on the 15 Mile Creek watershed and estuary.

Parrish Mill, from 1880, still functions, although it is no longer used for grist.

== Facilities ==
- 18 Tent/Trailer/RV Campsites
- 8 Cottages
- 1 Group Shelter
- 1 Pioneer Campground
- Canoe Rental
- 1 Group Shelter
- 4 Picnic Shelters
- 7.0 miles (11.3 km) of walking trails, 10 miles (16 km) of canoe trails

== Habitat ==
The park includes nature trails that wind over seven miles through sandy soil and pass through a bird sanctuary and a tortoise habitat. The many hardwoods also attract various woodpeckers, sap suckers, and other birds less often seen in the pine forests of southern Georgia. The old dunes of the lower Coastal Plain in the region features longleaf pines, wiregrass, turkey oaks, and a forest of dwarf oak. The loose soil is ideal for tortoise burrows, and the dense foliage of the wiregrass provides cover for a wide variety of wildlife.

== Pond ==
The park features a prominent "pond" more than one mile long that (when full) ranges from 2–3 feet (0.61–0.91 m) deep near the edges, 5–7 feet (1.5–2.1 m) deep further out, 8–10 feet (2.4–3.0 m) in the middle of the "red trail" (in the flow of the original creek), and 12–14 feet (3.7–4.3 m) just in front of the mill house. In periods of extended drought the water level can drop considerably and some of the paddling trails around the perimeter can almost dry up. There are three paddling trails available; one that runs up the center of the pond, and one near each of the outside borders. Kayaks and canoes are available for rent. Inflatables are not recommended due to occasional submerged tree stumps.
