= Frederick Barrow Hand =

American politician

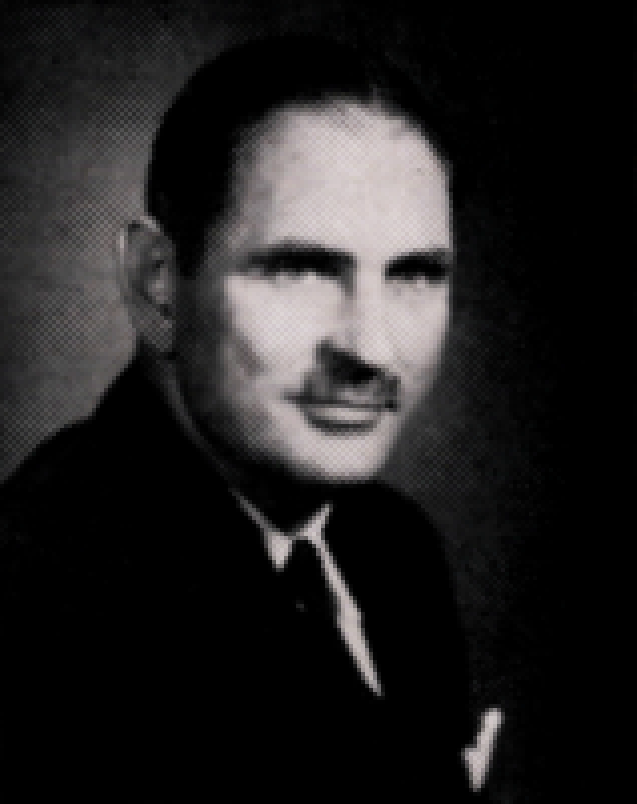
- Hand in 1953

Member of the Georgia State Senate from the 8th district
- In office 1931–1932

Member of the Georgia House of Representatives
- In office 1933–1938
- In office 1941–1954

Speaker of the Georgia House of Representatives
- In office 1947–1954
- Preceded by: Roy V. Harris
- Succeeded by: Marvin E. Moate

Personal details
- Born: October 26, 1904 Mitchell County, Georgia, U.S.
- Died: January 5, 1978 (aged 73)
- Party: Democratic

Frederick Barrow Hand (October 26, 1904 – January 5, 1978), also known as Fred Hand, was an American politician. He served as a Democratic member of the Georgia House of Representatives. He also served as a member for the 8th district of the Georgia State Senate.
