= Tom Linder =

Swedish ice hockey player

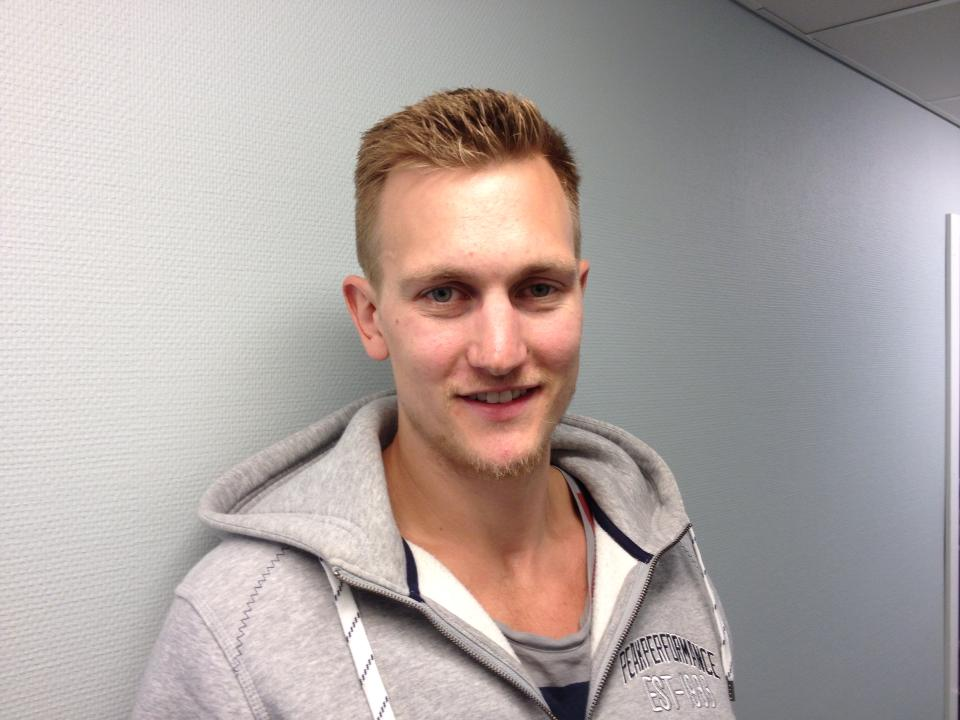
- Born: November 5, 1985 (age 40) Mönsterås, Sweden
- Height: 6 ft 6 in (198 cm)
- Weight: 220 lb (100 kg; 15 st 10 lb)
- Position: Defence
- Shot: Right
- Played for: Växjö Lakers; Leksands IF; Karlskrona HK
- Playing career: 2004–2018

Tom Linder (born July 21, 1985) is a Swedish former professional ice hockey defenceman.

== Playing career ==
Linder played in the Swedish Hockey League for Växjö Lakers, Leksands IF and Karlskrona HK.

== Career statistics ==
			Regular season					Playoffs
Season	Team	League	GP	G	A	Pts	PIM	GP	G	A	Pts	PIM
2003–04	IK Oskarshamn J20	J20 Elit	—	—	—	—	—	—	—	—	—	—
2003–04	IK Oskarshamn	Allsvenskan	27	0	0	0	12	—	—	—	—	—
2004–05	IK Oskarshamn J20	J20 Div.1	—	—	—	—	—	—	—	—	—	—
2004–05	IK Oskarshamn	Allsvenskan	42	1	1	2	32	10	0	1	1	8
2004–05	Olofströms IK	Division 1	2	0	1	1	2	—	—	—	—	—
2005–06	IK Oskarshamn J20	J20 Div.1	—	—	—	—	—	—	—	—	—	—
2005–06	IK Oskarshamn	HockeyAllsvenskan	42	2	2	4	36	—	—	—	—	—
2006–07	IK Oskarshamn	HockeyAllsvenskan	45	2	10	12	73	—	—	—	—	—
2007–08	IK Oskarshamn	HockeyAllsvenskan	45	3	7	10	66	—	—	—	—	—
2008–09	Växjö Lakers HC	HockeyAllsvenskan	42	1	10	11	34	9	1	1	2	8
2009–10	Växjö Lakers HC	HockeyAllsvenskan	49	3	10	13	38	7	0	0	0	4
2010–11	Växjö Lakers HC	HockeyAllsvenskan	52	3	10	13	104	2	0	1	1	0
2011–12	Växjö Lakers HC J20	J20 SuperElit	3	0	1	1	2	—	—	—	—	—
2011–12	Växjö Lakers HC	Elitserien	32	0	1	1	8	—	—	—	—	—
2011–12	IK Oskarshamn	HockeyAllsvenskan	2	0	0	0	4	—	—	—	—	—
2011–12	Tingsryds AIF	HockeyAllsvenskan	17	1	1	2	20	—	—	—	—	—
2012–13	Växjö Lakers HC J20	J20 SuperElit	3	1	1	2	2	—	—	—	—	—
2012–13	Växjö Lakers HC	Elitserien	35	1	3	4	14	—	—	—	—	—
2012–13	Karlskrona HK	HockeyAllsvenskan	4	1	0	1	0	—	—	—	—	—
2013–14	Leksands IF	SHL	55	0	3	3	48	3	0	0	0	0
2014–15	Karlskrona HK	HockeyAllsvenskan	45	7	15	22	22	4	0	1	1	0
2015–16	Karlskrona HK J20	J20 SuperElit	4	3	2	5	0	—	—	—	—	—
2015–16	Karlskrona HK	SHL	27	0	1	1	0	—	—	—	—	—
2016–17	IK Oskarshamn	HockeyAllsvenskan	52	1	6	7	36	—	—	—	—	—
2017–18	IK Oskarshamn	HockeyAllsvenskan	49	2	4	6	63	8	0	0	0	6
SHL (Elitserien) totals			149	1	8	9	70	3	0	0	0	0
HockeyAllsvenskan totals			444	26	75	101	496	30	1	3	4	18
