= George L. Smith (Georgia politician) =

American politician

Member of the Georgia House of Representatives
- In office 1944–1973

Speaker of the Georgia House of Representatives
- In office 1959–1962
- In office 1967–1973

Personal details
- Born: November 27, 1912 Stillmore, Georgia, U.S.
- Died: December 9, 1973 (aged 61) Atlanta, Georgia, U.S.
- Party: Democratic
- Spouse: Francis McWhorter Mobley
- Children: five
- Education: University of Georgia
- Occupation: lawyer

George Leon Smith II (November 27, 1912 – December 9, 1973) was an American politician in the state of Georgia.

Smith was born in Stillmore, Georgia in 1912, and attended the University of Georgia. Admitted to the Georgia bar in 1932, he was an attorney and served as City Attorney of Swainsboro, Georgia before his election to the Georgia House of Representatives in 1944. He served as the speaker of that body on two occasions, from 1959 to 1962, and from 1967 until his death in office from a stroke in 1973.

George L. Smith State Park near Twin City, Georgia is named in his honor.
