= Hamilton E. Holmes =

American orthopedic physician (1941–1995)

Hamilton Holmes
- Born: July 8, 1941; Atlanta, Georgia, U.S.
- Died: October 26, 1995 (aged 54); Atlanta, Georgia, U.S.
- Education: Morehouse College; University of Georgia (BS); Emory University (MD)
- Known for: Medical doctor, professor, associate dean, medical director of Grady Memorial Hospital
- Scientific career
- Fields: Orthopedics
- Workplaces: Emory University School of Medicine

Hamilton E. Holmes

Military service
- Allegiance: United States
- Branch/service: United States Army
- Years of service: 1969-72
- Rank: Major
- Unit: Army Rangers

Hamilton E. Holmes (8 July 1941 – 26 October 1995) was an American orthopedic physician. He and Charlayne Hunter-Gault were the first two Black American students admitted to the University of Georgia. Holmes was also the first Black American student to attend the Emory University School of Medicine, where he earned his M.D. degree in 1967, later becoming a professor of orthopedics and associate dean at the school.

== Early life ==
Holmes was born July 8, 1941, in Atlanta, Georgia. His father, Alfred, was an Atlanta businessman, and his mother, Isabella, was a teacher. His grandfather, Hamilton Mayo Holmes, was a physician, and was one of Hamilton's influences. His grandfather and uncle, Oliver Wendell Holmes, helped to desegregate golf courses in Atlanta in 1955.

In his high school years, Holmes attended Henry McNeal Turner High School, then considered one of the most prestigious high schools for Black Americans in Atlanta. He was a member of the football and basketball teams, and graduated in 1959 as valedictorian.

== Morehouse College and the University of Georgia ==
Holmes, along with fellow Henry McNeal Turner High School graduate Charlayne Hunter, applied to the University of Georgia in the fall of 1959; however, both were denied. Holmes enrolled at Morehouse College, and he and Hunter continued to apply to the University of Georgia every quarter. Meanwhile, Holmes sought membership and was initiated into the Alpha Rho chapter of Alpha Phi Alpha at Morehouse College. In January 1961, both Holmes and Hunter were admitted to UGA.

During his time at UGA, Holmes generally kept to himself. He lived off campus, and on the weekends, he would return home to Atlanta, where he continued his membership with the Morehouse College chapter of Alpha Phi Alpha until 1963. He was a member of Phi Beta Kappa fraternity and Phi Kappa Phi Honors fraternity.

== Emory University and medical career ==
After graduating from the University of Georgia, Holmes became the first Black American student to be accepted to the Emory University School of Medicine. He graduated in 1967 and began his residency at Detroit General Hospital. He left in 1969 to serve as an Army Ranger in Germany, before returning to Emory to complete his residency. He eventually opened a private practice in Atlanta, later becoming a professor and associate dean at Emory, and the medical director and head orthopedic surgeon at Grady Memorial Hospital.

== Personal life ==
Holmes was married to Marilyn Vincent Holmes. They had two children: a son, Hamilton Jr., who is also a University of Georgia alumnus, and a daughter, Alison.

He is a namesake of the Holmes-Hunter Academic Building on the University of Georgia campus and the university's Holmes-Hunter Lectures, and was a trustee of the University of Georgia Foundation.

Holmes died in 1995 of heart failure in Atlanta, Georgia.

== Legacy ==
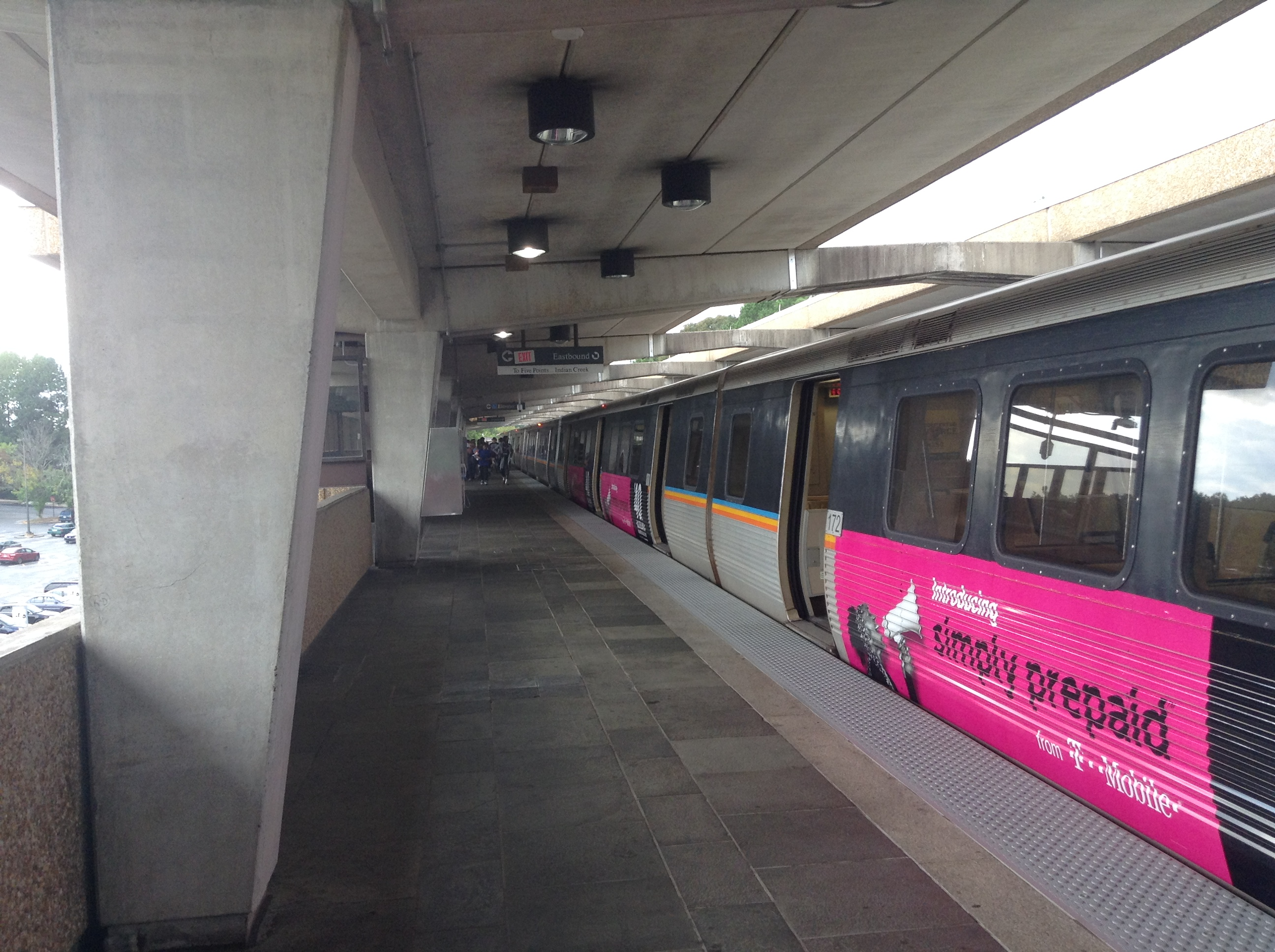
The Hamilton E. Holmes station

For many years after graduating, Holmes stayed away from the University of Georgia, stating that his "time as a student there was very bad". In the early 1980s, Holmes agreed to help plan the university's bicentennial celebration and became the first African-American to be on the university's board of trustees.

Several landmarks are named in his honor, including the Hamilton E. Holmes Elementary School in East Point, Georgia; Hamilton E. Holmes Drive (Highway 280) in Fulton County, Georgia, Hamilton Holmes Middle School in King William, Virginia; and the H.E. Holmes MARTA station in Atlanta. The first endowed professorship at the University of Georgia named for an Black American was created in his name on 11 November 1999. The University of Georgia Academic Building is named for him as well, along with Charlayne Hunter-Gault, as it is called the Holmes/Hunter Academic Building, as of 2001. In 2012, Emory University dedicated a new dorm in his honor, called Hamilton Holmes Hall. The Emory University School of Medicine hosts an annual memorial lecture series in his name honoring diversity in medicine.

== See also ==
- African-American firsts
- Alpha Phi Alpha brothers
