= Charlayne Hunter-Gault =

American journalist (born 1942)

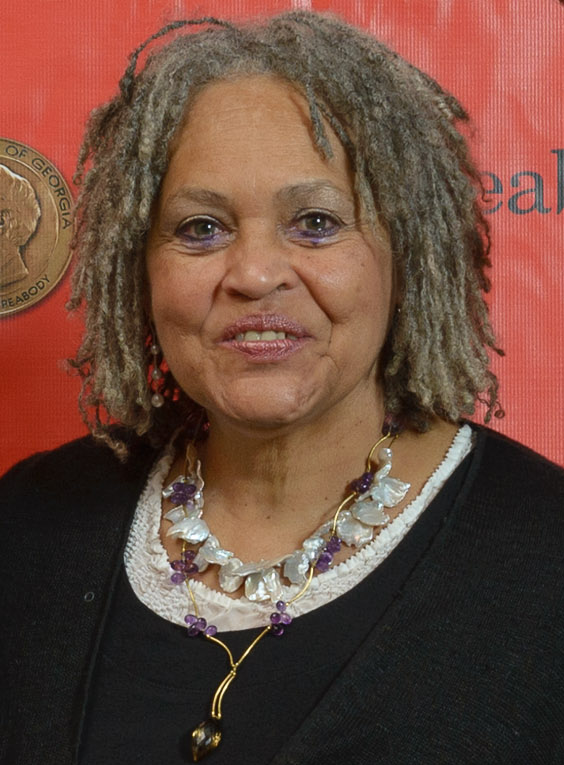
- Hunter-Gault in 2014
- Born: Alberta Charlayne Hunter; February 27, 1942 (age 84); Due West, South Carolina, U.S.
- Education: Wayne State University; University of Georgia (BA); Washington University
- Occupation: Journalist
- Notable credit(s): The New York Times; The New Yorker
- Spouse(s): Walter Stovall (1963–1971); Ronald Gault (1971–present)
- Children: 2

Alberta Charlayne Hunter-Gault (born February 27, 1942) is an American civil rights activist, journalist and former foreign correspondent for National Public Radio, CNN, and the Public Broadcasting Service. Charlayne Hunter and Hamilton Holmes were the first Black American students to attend the University of Georgia.

== Early life ==
Alberta Charlayne Hunter was born in Due West, South Carolina, daughter of Col. Charles Shepherd Henry Hunter Jr., U.S. Army, a regimental chaplain, and his wife, the former Althea Ruth Brown. Her mother brought her up, as her father was frequently away. She became interested in journalism at the age of 12 after reading the comic strip Brenda Starr, Reporter.

In 1955, one year after the Brown v. Board of Education ruling, Hunter was in eighth grade and was the only black student at an Army school in Alaska, where her father was stationed. Her parents divorced after spending the year in Alaska, and Hunter moved to Atlanta with her mother, two brothers, and maternal grandmother.

After moving to Atlanta, she attended Henry McNeal Turner High School where she became editor-in-chief of The Green Light, the school's newspaper, assistant yearbook editor, and "Miss Turner High".

In 1958, members of the Atlanta Committee for Cooperative Action (ACCA) began to search for high-achieving African-American seniors who attended high schools in Atlanta. They were interested in jump-starting the integration of white universities in Georgia. They were searching for the best students so that universities would have no reason to reject them other than race. Hunter, along with Hamilton Holmes were the two students selected by the committee to integrate Georgia State College (later Georgia State University) in Atlanta. However, Hunter and Holmes were more interested in attending the University of Georgia.

The two were initially rejected by the university on the grounds that there was no more room in the dorms for incoming freshmen who were required to live there. That fall, Hunter enrolled at Wayne University (later Wayne State University) where she received assistance from the Georgia tuition program on the basis that there were no black universities in the state who offered a journalism program.

Despite meeting the qualifications to transfer to the University of Georgia, she and Holmes were rejected every quarter due to the fact that there was no room for them in the dorms, but transfer students in similar situations were admitted. This led to court case Holmes v. Danner, in which the registrar of the university, Walter Danner, was the defendant. After winning the case, Holmes and Hunter became the first two African-American students to enroll in the University of Georgia on January 9, 1961.

Hunter graduated in 1963 with a B.A. in journalism.

== Career ==
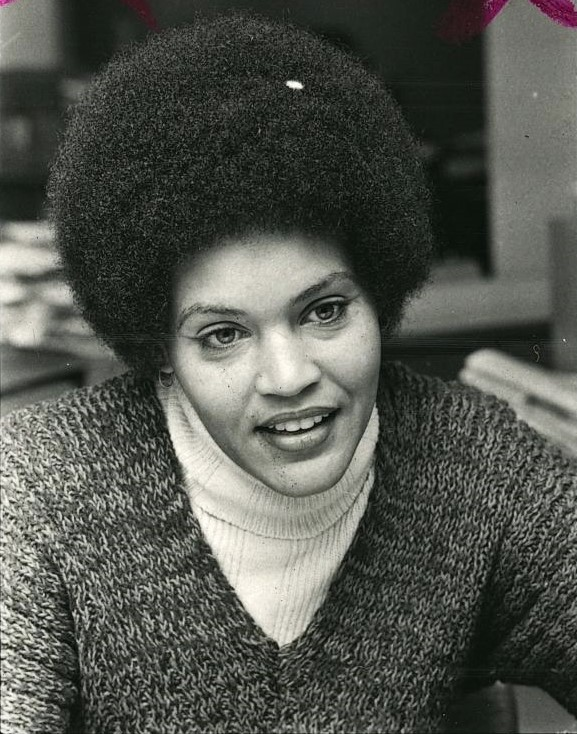
Hunter-Gault in 1975

In 1967, Hunter joined the investigative news team at WRC-TV, Washington, D.C., and anchored the local evening news. In 1968, Hunter-Gault joined The New York Times as a metropolitan reporter specializing in coverage of the urban Black community. She joined The MacNeil/Lehrer Report in 1978 as a correspondent, becoming The NewsHour's national correspondent in 1983. She left The NewsHour with Jim Lehrer in June 1997. She worked in Johannesburg, South Africa, as National Public Radio's chief correspondent in Africa (1997–99). Hunter-Gault then joined CNN as its Johannesburg bureau chief and correspondent in 1999. She exited this role in 2005, although she still regularly appeared on the network and others, as an Africa specialist.

During her association with The NewsHour, Hunter-Gault won additional awards: two Emmys and a Peabody for excellence in broadcast journalism for her work on Apartheid's People, a NewsHour series on South Africa. She also received the 1986 Journalist of the Year Award from the National Association of Black Journalists, a Candace Award for Journalism from the National Coalition of 100 Black Women in 1988, the 1990 Sidney Hillman Award, the Good Housekeeping Broadcast Personality of the Year Award, the Women in Radio and Television Award and two awards from the Corporation for Public Broadcasting for excellence in local programming. The University of Georgia Academic Building is named for her, along with Hamilton Holmes, as it is called the Holmes/Hunter Academic Building, as of 2001. She has been a member of the Peabody Awards Board of Jurors since 2009 and serves on the board of trustees at the Carter Center.

Hunter-Gault published In My Place in 1992 which was a memoir about her experiences at the University of Georgia.

== Personal life ==
While in high school, at the age of 16, Hunter, along with two friends, converted to Catholicism after being raised as a follower of the African Methodist Episcopal Church.

Shortly before she was graduated from the University of Georgia, Hunter married a classmate, Walter L. Stovall, the writer son of a chicken-feed manufacturer. The couple was first married in March 1963 and then remarried in Detroit, Michigan, on June 8, 1963, because they believed that, since he was white, the first ceremony might be considered invalid as well as criminal, based on laws about interracial marriages in the unidentified state in which they had been married. Once the marriage was revealed, the governor of Georgia called it "a shame and a disgrace", while Georgia's attorney general made public statements about prosecuting the mixed-race couple under Georgia law. News reports quoted the parents of both bride and groom as being against the marriage for reasons of race. Years later, after the couple's 1972 divorce, Hunter-Gault gave a speech at the university in which she praised Stovall, who, she said, "unhesitatingly jumped into my boat with me. He gave up going to movies because he knew I couldn't get a seat in the segregated theaters. He gave up going to the Varsity because he knew they would not serve me... We married, despite the uproar we knew it would cause, because we loved each other." Shortly after their marriage, Stovall was quoted as saying, "We are two young people who found ourselves in love and did what we feel is required of people when they are in love and want to spend the rest of their lives together. We got married." The couple had one daughter, Suesan Stovall, a singer (born December 1963).

Following her divorce from Walter Stovall, Hunter married Ronald T. Gault, a Black businessman who was then a program officer for the Ford Foundation. Later, he became an investment banker and consultant. They have one son, Chuma Gault, an actor (born 1972). The couple lived in Johannesburg, South Africa, where they also produced wine for a label called Passages. After moving back to the United States, the couple maintain a home in Massachusetts, where they remain active supporters of the arts.

== Filmography ==
- Dare to Struggle... Dare to Win (1999)
- Globalization & Human Rights (1998)
- Rights & Wrongs: Human Rights Television (1993)
- Summer of Soul (2021)

== Publications ==
- "A Trip to Leverton" The New Yorker (April 24, 1965). A short story-memoir
- "The Talk of the Town: Notes and Comment" The New Yorker 60/52 (February 11, 1985): 28–29. Talk piece about Darrell Cabey, shot by Bernhard Goetz
- Hunter-Gault, Charlayne (July 27, 2020). "Hughes at Columbia". The Talk of the Town. December 30, 1967. The New Yorker. Vol. 96, no. 21. pp. 12–13.
- Valade, Roger M.; Kasinec, Denise (1996). The Schomburg Center Guide to Black Literature: From the Eighteenth Century to the Present. Schomburg Center for Research in Black Culture. Detroit: Gale Research. pp. 214–215. ISBN 0-7876-0289-2. OCLC 32924112.

== General and cited references ==
- Hackett, David, Hunter-Gault on Journalism, Civil Rights and Faith, Sarasota Magazine, January 21, 2019
- Amanda Nash (March 29, 2004). "Charlayne Hunter-Gault". New Georgia Encyclopedia. University of Georgia.
- Carol Sears Botsch (December 27, 1997). "Charlayne Hunter-Gault". USC Aiken. Archived from the original on May 17, 2008.
