= Ohio's 15th senatorial district =

American legislative district

Ohio's 15th State Senate district
Senator
Hearcel Craig; D–Columbus
- Demographics: 40.1% White; 47% Black; 7.8% Hispanic; 4.2% Asian; 2.1% Native American; 0.2% Hawaiian/Pacific Islander
- Population (2020) • Voting age • Citizens of voting age: 350,690; 269,201; 252,936

Ohio's 15th senatorial district comprises the south-east section of metropolitan Columbus in Franklin County. It encompasses Ohio House Districts 1, 2, and 3.

The current Ohio Senator is Democrat Hearcel Craig and will be succeeded by Democratic member-elect Latyna Humphrey in January 2027.

== 2026 election results ==
Latyna Humphrey (D) 92,772 85%

Joseph Healy (R) 16,340, 15%

== Historically ==
Before the 2023 redistricting, Ohio's15th district has always been based in Columbus, Ohio. The district previously comprised central Franklin County. It encompassed Ohio House districts 18, 25 and 26. It has a Cook PVI of D+30. Ohio Governor John Kasich represented the district from 1979 to 1982.

== List of senators ==
Senator	Party	Term	Notes
John W. Bowen	Republican	January 3, 1967 – December 31, 1970	Bowen lost re-election in 1970 to Jerry O'Shaughnessy.
Jerry O'Shaughnessy	Democrat	January 5, 1971 – August 23, 1972	O'Shaughnessy died prior to the expiration of his term in 1974.
Robert O'Shaughnessy	Democrat	October 2, 1972 – December 31, 1978	O'Shaughnessy lost re-election in 1978 to John Kasich.
John Kasich	Republican	January 3, 1979 – December 31, 1982	Kasich did not seek re-election to the Ohio Senate in 1982.
Richard Pfeiffer	Democrat	January 3, 1983 – April 21, 1992	Pfeiffer resigned to take a seat on the Franklin County Municipal Court.
Ben Espy	Democrat	April 21, 1992 – December 31, 2002	Espy was term-limited in 2002.
Ray Miller	Democrat	January 6, 2003 – December 31, 2010	Miller was term-limited in 2010.
Charleta Tavares	Democrat	January 3, 2011 – December 31, 2018	Tavares was term-limited in 2018.
Hearcel Craig	Democrat	January 1, 2019 – present	Incumbent
