= Senator O'Shaughnessy =

Senator O'Shaughnessy may refer to:

- Jerry O'Shaughnessy (1906–1972), Ohio State Senate
- Robert O'Shaughnessy (1918–1991), Ohio State Senate
