= Joseph Reason =

Joseph Reason may refer to:

- Joseph Henry Reason (1905–1997), American librarian
- J. Paul Reason (born 1941), United States Navy admiral, son of Joseph Henry Reason
