= Margaret Davis Bowen =

American educator (1894–1976)

- Born: Margaret Davis; May 24, 1894; Columbus, Georgia, US
- Died: April 20, 1976 (aged 81); Columbus, Ohio, US
- Burial place: South-View Cemetery
- Education: University of Cincinnati, B.S., M.Ed., and Ed.D.
- Occupations: Teacher and principal
- Employers: Cincinnati Public Schools; Gilbert Academy; Atlanta Public Schools
- Organization(s): Alpha Kappa Alpha; Just Us (Atlanta)
- Spouse: John W. E. Bowen Jr.
- Children: John W. E. Bowen III

Margaret Davis Bowen (May 24, 1894 – April 20, 1976) was a religious leader, civil rights activist, and educator. She was the first principal of the Gilbert Academy, a private Black preparatory school in New Orleans, during the late 1930s. From 1936 to 1939 she served as the National Basileus of Alpha Kappa Alpha sorority.

== Early life and education ==
Margaret Davis was born on May 24, 1894, in Columbus, Georgia. She was the first African American to attend the National German-American Teachers' Seminary, part of the University of Wisconsin, where she studied German and became one of its first two Black graduates.

She earned a BS, followed by an M.Ed. in 1935, from the University of Cincinnati. While at the university, she formed a chapter Alpha Kappa Alpha sorority in 1921. She received a fellowship from the University of Cincinnati's Teachers College, completing the work for an Ed.D. in 1950.

== Career ==
Bowen became a German teacher and, then, an elementary teacher for the Cincinnati Public Schools, teaching there for eighteen years.

She was hired to be the first president and principal of the Gilbert Academy, a private Black preparatory school in New Orleans, on November 21, 1940. Bowen was an advocate of progressive education, creating a curriculum that led to accreditation from the Southern Association of Colleges and Preparatory Schools in the academy's first.

In November 1948 she resigned from Gilbert and moved to Atlanta where she was taught for the Atlanta Public School.

She was the first president of the neighborhood association of Just Us, a tiny westside neighborhood of Atlanta near Washington Park.

== Honors ==
In March 1950, she received an honorary Doctor of Law degree from Bethune-Cookman College. In 1956, she was selected as the teacher of the year at M. M. Bethune Elementary School in Atlanta, Georgia.

Just Us, a tiny westside neighborhood of Atlanta dedicated a small park in her honor.

IN 1964, Alpha Kappa Alpha established the Margaret Davis Bowen Award, presented by its Southeast Region.

== Personal life ==
She married John W. E. Bowen Jr., the editor of the Christian Advocate. Later, he became a bishop in the Methodist Episcopal Church. Their son, John W. E. Bowen III, became a state senator in Ohio. The family moved to Mississippi and Louisiana when her husband was transferred to a conference there.

From 1936 to 1939, she served as the National Basileus or president of Alpha Kappa Alpha sorority. She was also the sorority's national secretary. She was also the president of the Central Jurisdictional Women's Society of Christian Service for eight years. She was the first president of the Just Us Neighbor's Club of the westside neighborhood of Atlanta near Washington Park. She was also a member of the National Council of Negro Women.

She died on April 20, 1976, at the Wesley Glenn Methodist Retirement Center in Columbus, Ohio. She was buried in South-View Cemetery in Atlanta.

== Publications ==
- "Youth in a Changing World", The Ivy Leaf, Alpha Kappa Alpha Sorority, March 1939. Vol. 17, No. 1.
