= Just Us, Atlanta =

Just Us
- Neighborhood of Atlanta
- Location of Just Us in Atlanta
- Coordinates: 33.752136°N 84.424814°W
- Country: United States
- State: Georgia
- County: Fulton

Government
  - Type: Neighborhood of Atlanta
- Time zone: UTC-5 (Eastern (EST))
  - Summer (DST): UTC-4 (EDT)
- ZIP codes: 30314

Just Us is the smallest of the official neighborhoods of Atlanta, consisting of only two streets. It began as the "Fountain Drive-Morris Brown Drive Community Club" in the late 1940s, and evolved into its present name today during the early 1950s. It was established as the first black owned, constructed sub-division in the city of Atlanta. Just Us was on the tour of the Dogwood Trail with its beautiful horticultural display, as well as on the tour route of the city of Atlanta’s scenic Christmas array of lights. The neighborhood has two triangular Parks, I and II, with Park I dedicated to its first President, Margaret Davis Bowen, and Park II, dedicated to President John F. Kennedy, with an eternal gas light flame, as well as a plaque dedicated to Martin Luther King Jr.

== Geography ==
Just Us consists of most of Fountain Drive SW and Morris Brown Drive SW, south of Martin Luther King Jr. Drive SW. Just Us is bordered by Washington Park on the north and Mozley Park on the west, and by Ashview Heights on the south and east. Just Us is approximately 0.7 miles west of the Ashby MARTA station.
