= John W. E. Bowen Sr. =

American Methodist clergyman and academic

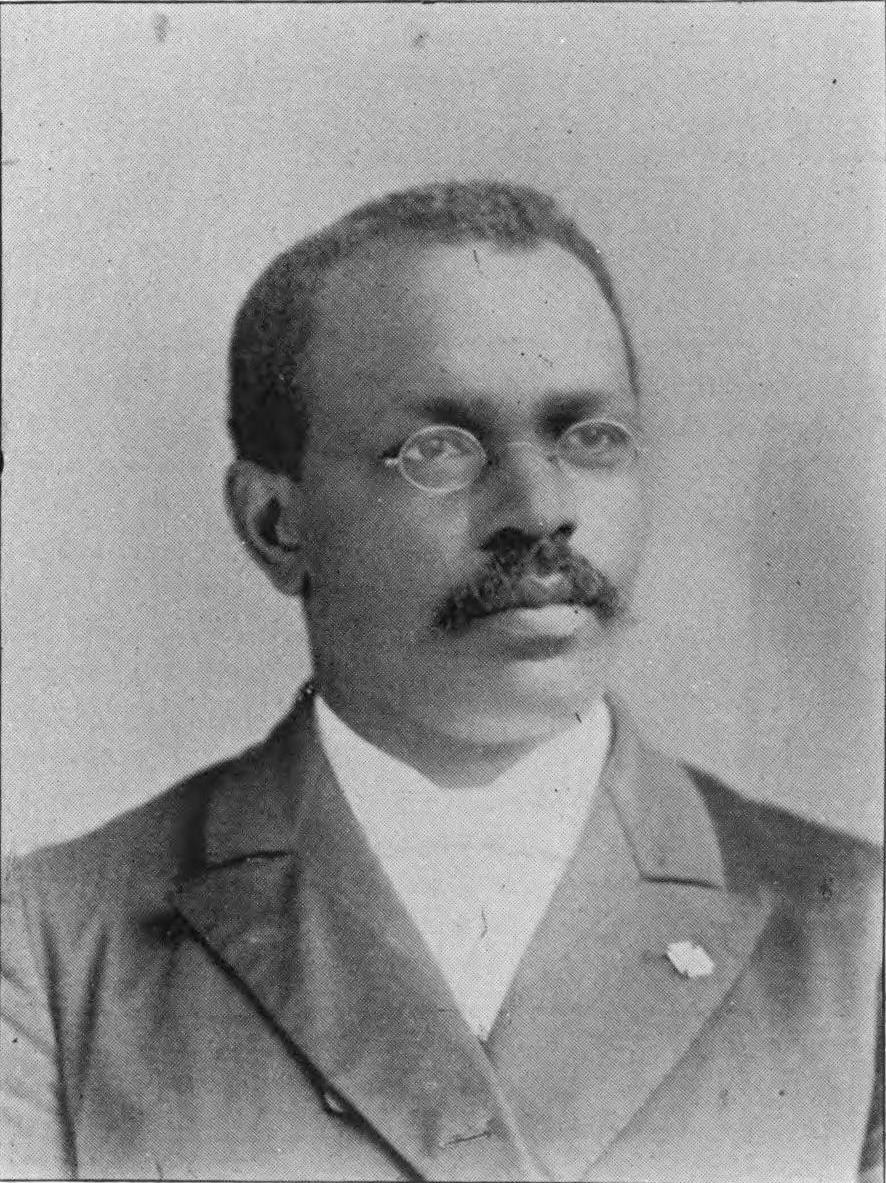
- Born: December 3, 1855; New Orleans
- Died: July 20, 1933
- Resting place: South-View Cemetery
- Occupation: Missionary
- Spouse(s): Ariel Serena Hedges (died 1904) Irene L. Smallwood (m. 1906)
- Children: 4

John Wesley Edward Bowen Sr. (December 3, 1855 – July 20, 1933) was born into American slavery and became a Methodist clergyman, denominational official, college and university educator. He was one of the first African Americans to earn a Ph.D. degree in the United States. He is credited as the first African American to receive the Ph.D. degree from Boston University, which was granted in 1887.

== Biography ==
=== Early life ===
Bowen was born in New Orleans, Louisiana, on December 3, 1855, the son of Edward Bowen and Rose Simon Bowen. Edward Bowen, a carpenter, was originally from Maryland and later lived in Washington, D.C., but moved to New Orleans, where he was enslaved and held in bondage until he purchased his own freedom. In 1858, he purchased freedom for his wife and son, then three years old. Edward Bowen later served in the Union Army during the Civil War. Rose Simon Bowen was the granddaughter of an African princess of the Jolloffer tribe on the west coast of Africa.

=== Education ===
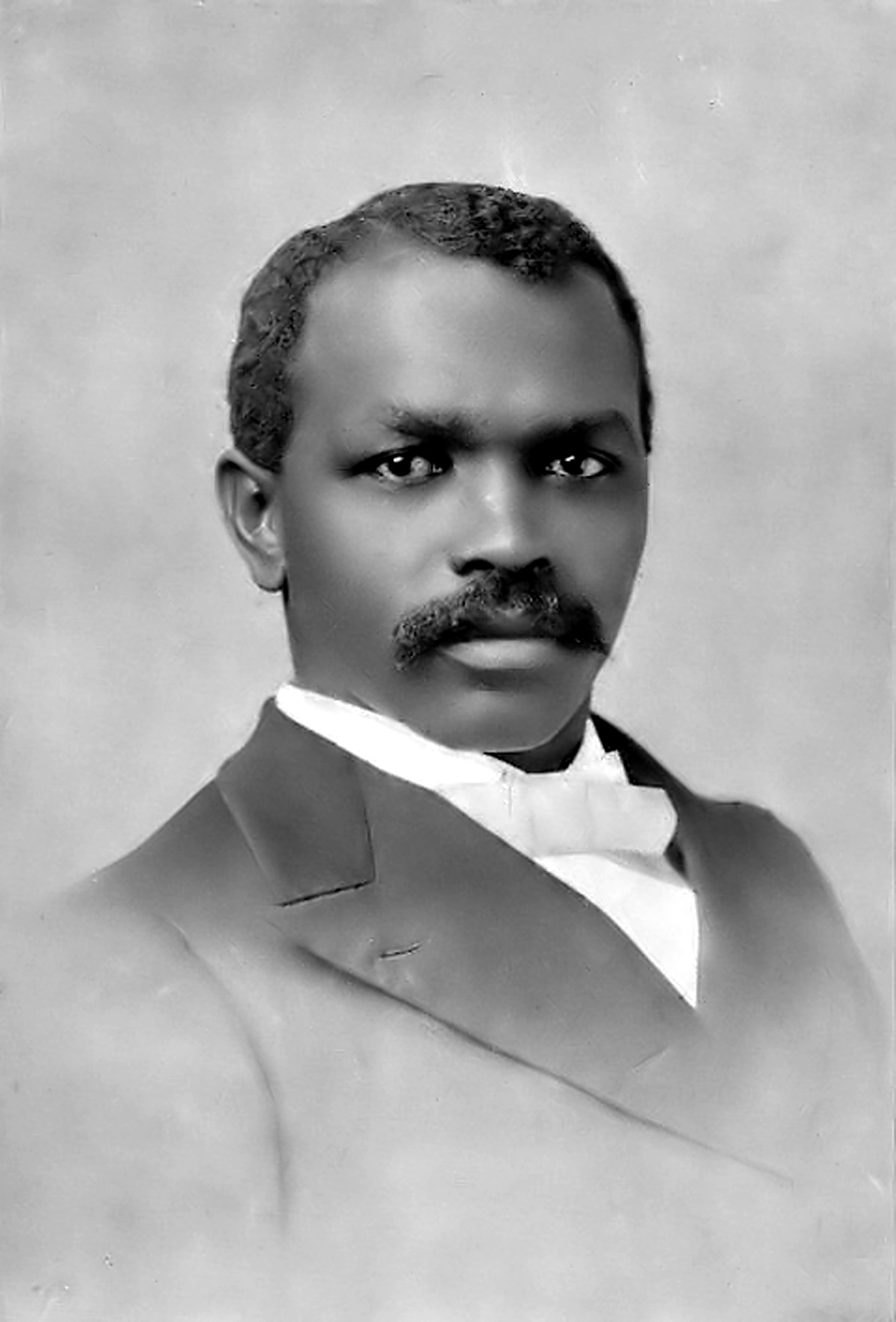
J. W. E. Bowen Sr., c. 1880s

J. W. E. Bowen Sr. with his son, Rev. (and future Methodist Episcopal Church {now United Methodist Church} Bishop) J. W. E. Bowen Jr., and grandson (and future lawyer and member of Ohio State Senate) J. W. E. Bowen III, c. 1927

After the Civil War, J. W. E. Bowen studied at the Union Normal School in New Orleans, and New Orleans University, a university established by the Methodist Episcopal Church for the education of freedmen. (New Orleans University merged with Straight College in 1934 to form Dillard University) Bowen received a Bachelor of Arts degree with the university's first graduating class in 1878. From 1878 to 1882, he taught mathematics, Latin and Greek at Central Tennessee College (later known as Walden University (Tennessee)) in Nashville.

In 1882, Bowen began theological studies at Boston University. While a theological student, he was the pastor of Revere Street Methodist Episcopal Church in Boston, Massachusetts. In 1884, he completed work on, and was awarded, a Master of Arts (M.A.) degree from New Orleans University. When he completed the requirements for the Bachelor of Sacred Theology (S.T.B.) degree from Boston University in 1885, his classmates selected him as one of two students to speak at commencement exercises.

After graduation, Bowen became pastor of St. John's Methodist Episcopal Church in Newark, New Jersey. He received a Master of Arts degree from New Orleans University in 1886. He married Ariel Serena Hedges of Baltimore, Maryland in 1886. They became the parents of four children.

In that same year, Bowen entered the Ph.D. program at Boston University in historical theology. He also did special advanced work in Greek, Latin, Hebrew, Chaldee, Arabic, and German, and in metaphysics and psychology. Boston University conferred the Ph.D. degree upon him in 1887. Later, Gammon Theological Seminary made him its first recipient of the honorary degree of doctor of divinity.

=== Baltimore and Washington D.C. years ===
Bowen was chiefly a pastor after completing his doctoral degree. He pastored the Centennial Methodist Episcopal Church in Baltimore and also served as a professor of church history and systematic theology at Morgan College. A gifted preacher, Bowen conducted a notable revival during this pastorate in which there were 735 conversions. Bowen also served as pastor of Asbury Methodist Episcopal Church in Washington, D.C. and as a professor of Hebrew at Howard University.

From 1889 to 1893, Bowen was a member and examiner for the American Institute of Sacred Literature. In 1892, he published "What Shall the Harvest Be? A National Sermon; or A Series of Plain Talks to the Colored People of America, on Their Problems." He represented the Methodist Episcopal church at the Conferences of World Methodism in Washington D.C. in 1891 and London in 1901.

=== Years at Gammon Theological Seminary ===
In 1893, Bowen became professor of historical theology at Gammon Theological Seminary in Atlanta, Georgia, a seminary founded in 1883 by the Methodist Episcopal Church for the preparation of African-American clergymen. He was the first African-American to teach there full-time. As the secretary of Gammon's Stewart Missionary Foundation for Africa, he also edited its periodical, the Stewart Missionary Magazine.

In October, 1895, Bowen delivered "An Appeal to the King" on "Negro Day" at the Atlanta Cotton States' Exposition. That December, he organized an important three-day conference on Africa held in conjunction with the exposition and published its proceedings as "Africa and the American Negro...Addresses and Proceedings of the Congress on Africa Held Under the Auspices of the Stewart Missionary Foundation for Africa of Gammon Theological Seminary in Connection with the Cotton States and International Exposition December 13–15, 1895" (1896).

As a member of the Board of Control of the Methodist Episcopal Church's Epworth League, he organized a national conference in Atlanta on the Christian education of African-American youth. With Irvine Garland Penn, Bowen also edited and published its proceedings, "The United Negro:...Addresses and Proceedings, The Negro Young People's Christian and Educational Congress," held on August 6–11, 1902 (1902).

In January 1904, Bowen and Jesse Max Barber launched The Voice of the Negro, a Literary journal addressed to a national audience of African Americans. In September, 1905, they endorsed the Niagara Movement. Months later, they promoted the organization of the Georgia Equal Rights League, which had similar objectives. At the peak of its circulation in 1906, The Voice of the Negro claimed 12,000 to 15,000 subscribers.

In 1906, Bowen became the President of Gammon. In September, however, his inaugural year was shadowed by a severe race riot in which white rioters brutally attacked black people in Atlanta. Bowen opened the seminary to shelter black refugees from the riot. Three days after the rioting began, he was beaten and arrested by Atlanta's white police. Barber fled the city, taking The Voice of the Negro with him to Chicago, where he continued its publication for a year without Bowen's assistance. Bowen survived the Atlanta race riot and served as Gammon's president until 1910.

Bowen retired as head of the church history department of Gammon in 1926 but continued to teach until 1932, when he became an emeritus professor.

Bowen and his first wife, Ariel Serena Hedges Bowen, were the parents of four children. One of the children, John W.E. Bowen Jr., graduated from Phillips Exeter Academy, Wesleyan University and Harvard University. He became, like his father, a prominent figure in the Methodist Episcopal church, and was elected a bishop in 1949. Bowen's first wife died in 1904 while visiting the World's Fair in St. Louis, Missouri. In 1906 he married Irene L. Smallwood, who survived him. Bowen died on July 20, 1933, the last of his New Orleans University graduating class and the school's oldest alumnus.

Who has not heard of John Wesley Edward Bowen, who was born in New Orleans in 1855, educated there and at Boston University and has worked at Morgan, Howard and Gammon? For twenty-five years while at Gammon he has been the kind of upstanding figure in the Methodist Episcopal Church which has made that church hesitate to get rid of him and his kind.

— W. E. B. Dubois from The Crisis, Vol. 16, No. 4, p. 184, 1918
