= Bazoline Estelle Usher =

20th-century American educator

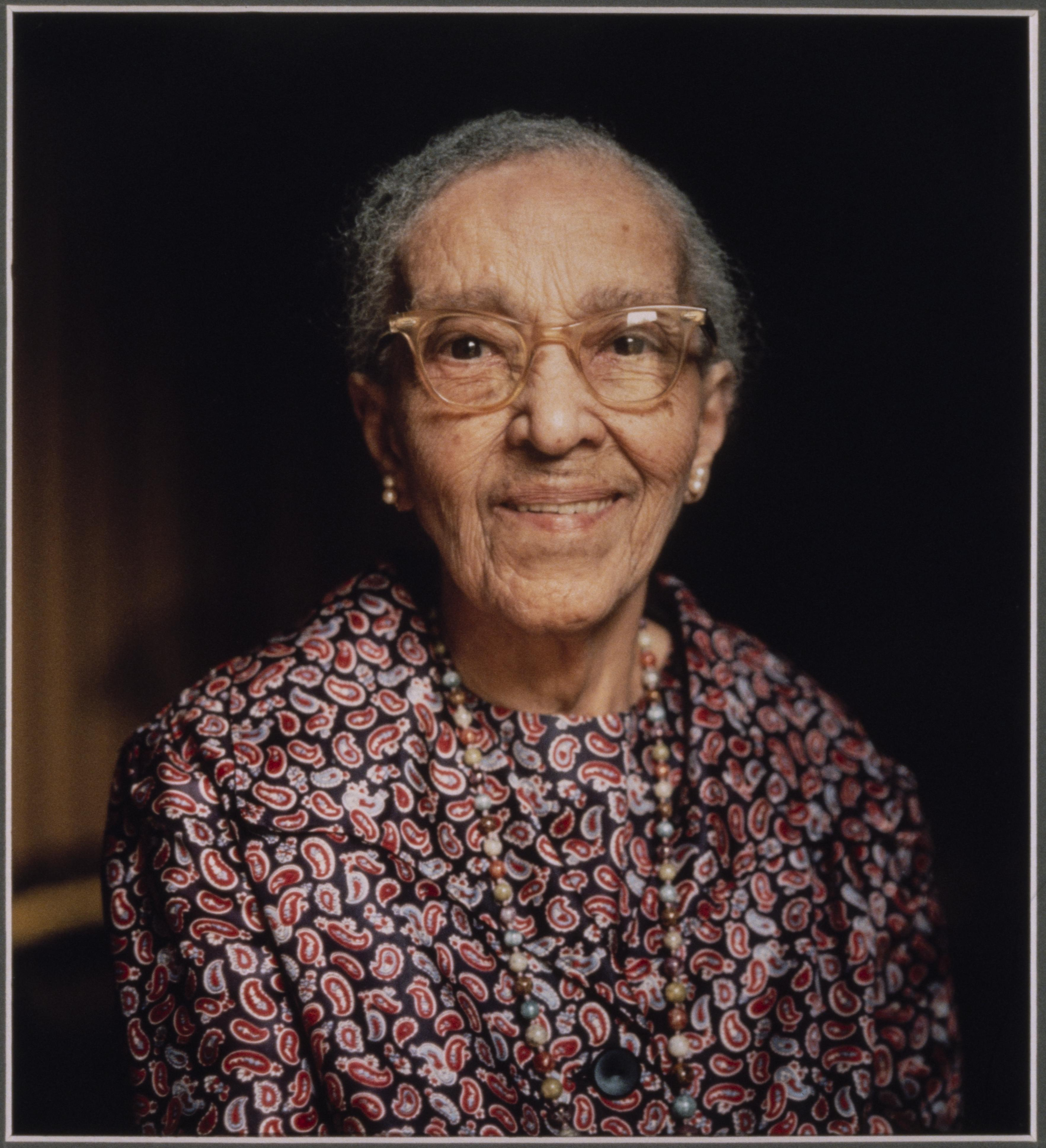
- Portrait by Judith Sedwick, 1982
- Born: Basil Estelle Usher; December 26, 1885; Walnut Grove, Georgia, U.S.
- Died: February 8, 1992 (aged 106); Atlanta, Georgia, U.S.
- Burial place: South-View Cemetery, Atlanta
- Occupation: Educator
- Years active: 1906–1958

Bazoline Estelle Usher (December 26, 1885 – February 8, 1992) was an American educator known for her work in the Atlanta Public Schools. As director of education for African-American children in the district prior to integration, she was the first African American to have an office at Atlanta City Hall. She founded the first Girl Scout troop for African-American girls in Atlanta in 1943. Her career as an educator lasted over 50 years, over 40 of which were in the Atlanta schools. A school in Atlanta is named for her, and in 2014 she was posthumously named a Georgia Woman of Achievement.

== Biography ==
Basil Estelle Usher was born December 26, 1885, to Joe Samuel Usher and Lavada Florence Usher in Walnut Grove, Georgia. She was the oldest of four children. She was given her first name after the herb, which her mother used in cooking. But she changed her first name to Bazoline just before college because she thought Basil was too masculine.

=== Education ===
Usher started school at age four at her local Baptist church. When the family moved to Oxford, Georgia, in 1892, she continued at a two-teacher, two-room schoolhouse also at a Baptist church.

In 1894 her family moved again, this time to Covington, Georgia, in part so the children could attend better schools. Here Usher attended the school run by Dinah Watts Pace as part of her orphanage. She received good grades and a recommendation to the high school preparatory courses at Atlanta University.

Usher attended Atlanta University from 1899 to 1906, first at the preparatory school and then the university. She graduated second in her university class and was a "brilliant student". She also took classes at the University of Chicago and completed her master's degree at Atlanta University in 1937.

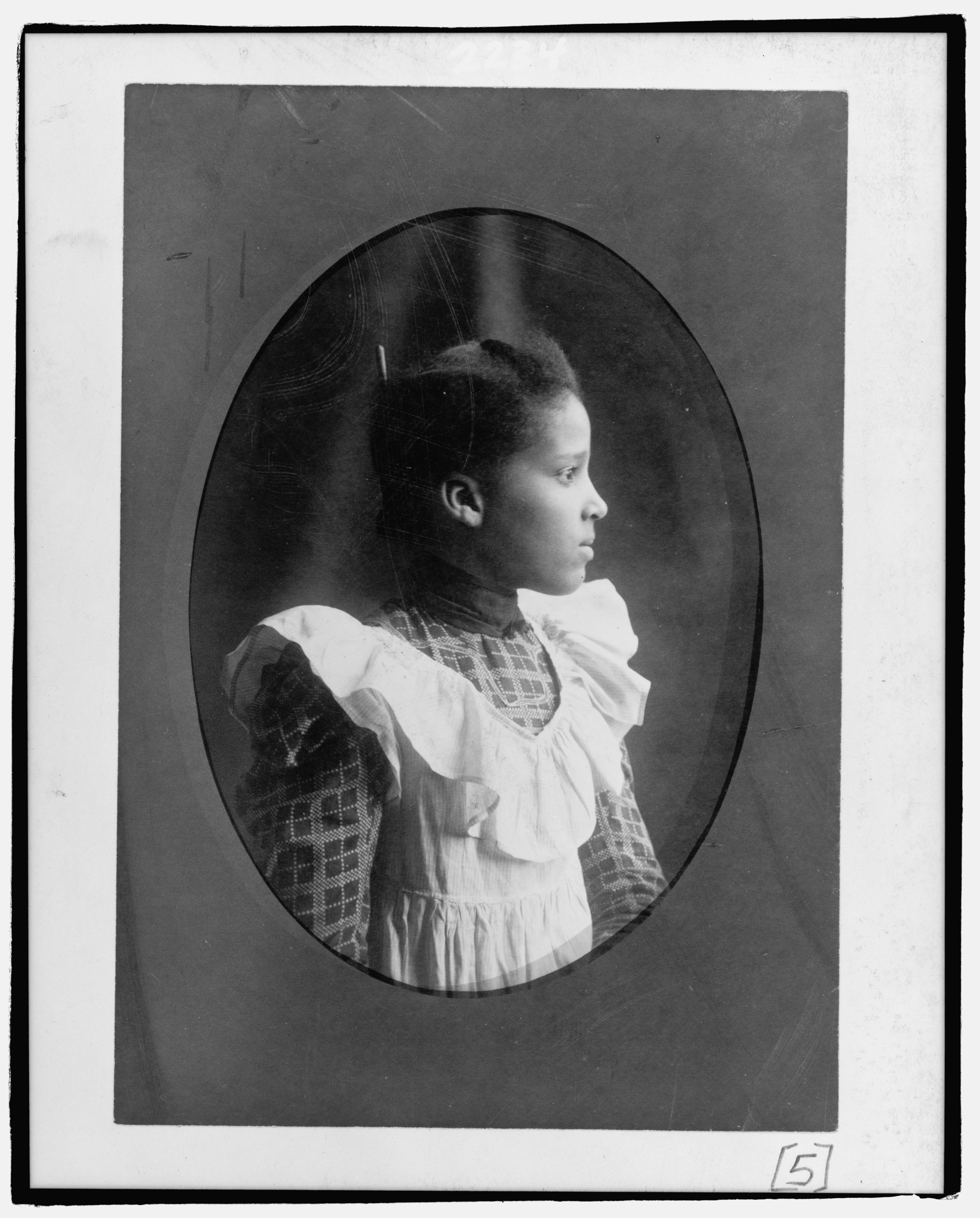
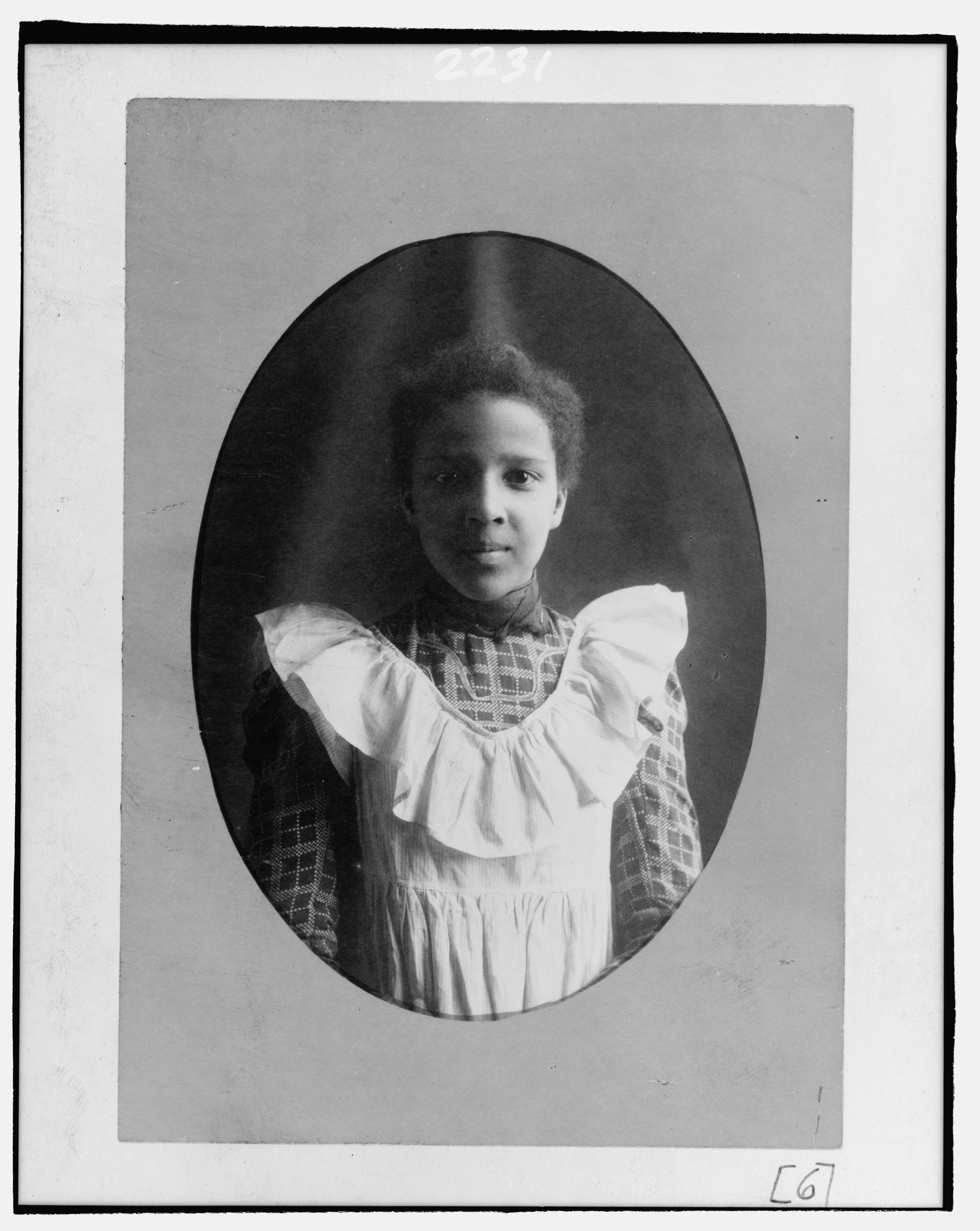
Photos of Usher taken by Thomas E. Askew for W. E. B. Du Bois c. 1900

At the age of 13 Usher tutored other students in math, including one who lived in the Alonzo Herndon household. Usher was the only woman in her class at Atlanta University, and she remembered that one of her favorite teachers was W. E. B. Du Bois. Usher found work on Saturdays in the Du Bois household helping out with domestic tasks, and became close with Du Bois and his wife Nina. When Du Bois was preparing a photography project for The Exhibit of American Negroes at the Paris Exposition of 1900, Usher was one of many Atlanta University students that he photographed.

=== Career as an educator ===
After graduation, Usher could not find a teaching job in Atlanta. Instead she taught math and science at American Missionary Association High School in Virginia from 1906 to 1911.

Usher returned to Atlanta and began teaching seventh grade in the Atlanta schools in 1915. In 1917 she became principal of Wesley Avenue School, remaining in that position for five years. Usher then transferred to Booker T. Washington High School, where she became that school's first assistant principal. In 1929 she transferred to David T. Howard Grammar School, where she served for 14 years as principal of the first Atlanta black school with an all-African-American faculty.

In 1943 she founded Girl Scout troops for African-American girls in Atlanta, some of the earliest in the South. In 1952 she was elected to the board of the Atlanta Girl Scout organization. "Miss Usher loved the Girl Scouts" and remained a member of the organization until her death.

In 1944 she was appointed Director and Supervisor of Negro Schools for the Atlanta School System, the highest position an African American had ever attained in Atlanta schools. She was also the first African American to have an office at Atlanta City Hall. She was proud that she integrated the elevator at city hall, riding the first one that arrived "rather than waiting for the elevator designated for 'blacks and baggage' as she was supposed to do". She held that role until her retirement from the Atlanta schools in 1954. She had been scheduled to retire in 1952 at age 67, but was persuaded to remain for another two years.

During the summer breaks from her Atlanta teaching work, she consulted and taught at Atlanta University, Agricultural and Technical College of North Carolina, and Fort Valley State College. For three years after her official retirement, she taught at Spelman College.

=== Personal life ===
Usher was never a drinker or smoker. She was a talented seamstress ("I was a star in my sewing class") and continued sewing when she could even late in life. She played basketball on occasion and was twice the city's women's tennis champion. She followed professional sports including baseball, basketball, and football.

Usher was a member of Atlanta's historic Friendship Baptist Church for 89 years, and taught Sunday school to young members including Maynard Jackson. She occasionally served as organist for the church, and was one of the original members of the church's Uplifters Club. She was also a member of the Kappa Omega chapter of Alpha Kappa Alpha sorority.

During her early career it was expected that women teachers remain single while employed; as a result, Usher never married. She expressed some regret for this later in life. She did become a mother via adoption of her niece Lavada Usher Johnson Smith in 1933 after the death of the child's mother.

Usher outlived all of her three younger siblings. Late in her life she lived with her niece (who also became a teacher) and then in a nursing home. She died February 8, 1992, at the age of 106, and was buried in South-View Cemetery in Atlanta.

=== Honors ===
Usher was named 1946 Bronze Woman of the Year by the Iota Phi Lambda sorority. She was given an honorary membership in the Phi Delta Kappa national teacher's sorority in 1950. In 1953 she was given a "scroll of honor" from the Georgia Teachers and Education Association and Fort Valley State College. In 1966 Atlanta University gave her a special citation of appreciation on the 60th anniversary of her graduation. In 1988 Harwell Road Elementary School in the historic Collier Heights neighborhood of Atlanta was renamed the Bazoline E. Usher Middle School in her honor. In 1989 the Atlanta Girl Scout Council honored her for a "century of service to others". In 2014 she was inducted into the Georgia Women of Achievement hall of fame.
