= John W. Bowen =

American politician (1926 – 2011)

John W. E. Bowen III

Member of the Ohio Senate from the 15th district
- In office January 3, 1967 – December 31, 1970
- Preceded by: Inaugural holder
- Succeeded by: Jerry O'Shaughnessy

Personal details
- Born: October 4, 1926 Jackson, Mississippi
- Died: May 27, 2011 (aged 84) Columbus, Ohio
- Party: Republican

John Wesley Edward Bowen III (October 2, 1926 – May 27, 2011) was a Republican politician who, in 1966 became the first African American elected to the Ohio Senate from Franklin County.

== Biography ==
=== Early life and education ===
John W.E. Bowen III was born on October 4, 1926, in Jackson, Mississippi, to the Reverend John W.E. Bowen, Jr. and Margaret Davis Bowen. He is the paternal grandson of John W.E. Bowen, Sr., former President of Gammon Theological Seminary in Atlanta, Georgia and Ariel Serena Hedges Bowen, former Professor of Music at Clark College in Atlanta.

He attended elementary schools in Cincinnati, Ohio, and New Orleans, Louisiana, and graduated from Gilbert Academy High School, of New Orleans, Louisiana in 1943. He attended Lincoln University (Pennsylvania), in Oxford, Pennsylvania, for two years, where he was initiated into Alpha Phi Alpha fraternity.

His college studies were interrupted in June, 1945, when he was drafted into The United States Army, where He qualified as a sharpshooter, and was trained as a combat engineer, a surveyor, and subsequently served as an information and education specialist.

He received an honorable discharge in 1946 and resumed his academic studies for two years at the University of Southern California. While attending U.S.C., he was a member of the 1947–48 and 1948-49 Track and Field Teams where he was coached by Dean Cromwell and Jess Hill.

He received an L.L.B. from The Ohio State University School of Law in 1953 and began his legal career in the Columbus, Ohio City Attorney's Office where he served as an Assistant City Attorney, Senior Assistant City Attorney, Chief Counsel of the Office's Civil Division, and First Assistant City Attorney. After leaving the office of the City Attorney, he engaged in the full-time private law practice for over 50 years.

=== Ohio Senate ===
Bowen initially ran for the Ohio Senate in 1966, following the Voting Rights Act of 1965. Opposed by Jerry O'Shaughnessy, Bowen ultimately won the race by only 240 votes. With his victory, he was the first African American elected as a legislator from Franklin County. He was a member of the Ohio Senate, serving in the 107th and 108th General Assemblies from 1967 through 1970. During his four years in the senate, more than 17 bills he introduced became law in the areas of insurance, child day care, housing, credit unions, commercial law and criminal law. His tiebreaking vote in committee gave Ohio permanent daylight saving time.

In 1970, Bowen was up for reelection, and O'Shaughnessy opted for a rematch. However, this time, Bowen was defeated, limiting his time as a legislator to one term, or four years.

=== Later career ===
He was one of 100 graduates to be awarded The Ohio State University Centennial Achievement Award in 1970, and was awarded an Honorary Doctor of Laws Degree by Ohio Northern University in Ada, Ohio in 1971. The John W.E. Bowen III Memorial Roadway in Columbus, Ohio is named in his memory.

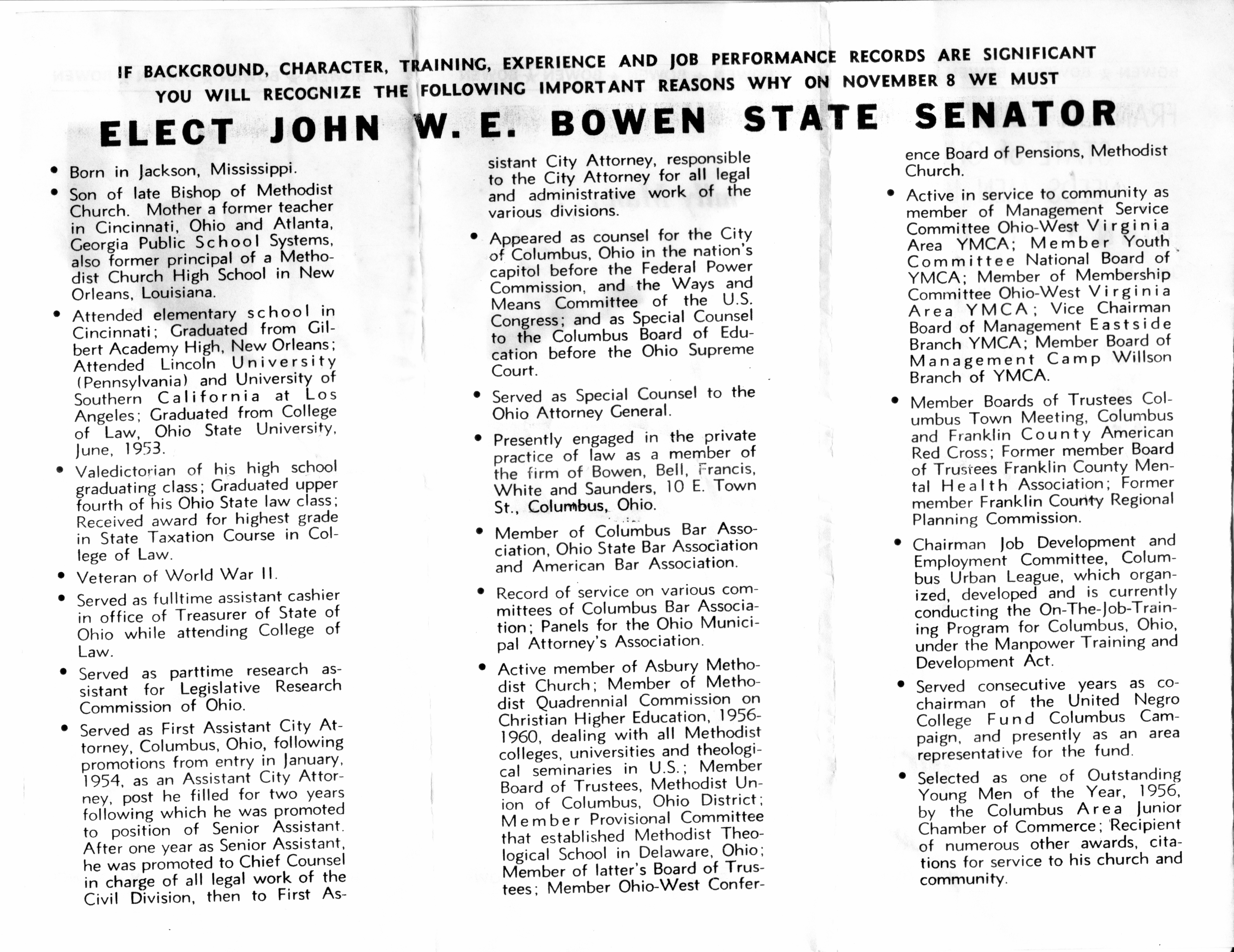
Campaign Literature from 1966 - Back
