= Freddye Scarborough Henderson =

American businesswoman and travel agent (1917-2007)

Freddye Scarborough Henderson (February 18, 1917– January 19, 2007) was an American business woman and travel agent known for pioneering travel agencies geared towards African-Americans. She created the first accredited black-owned travel agency in America called Henderson Travel Service in Atlanta, Georgia. Henderson was born in Franklinton, Louisiana, on February 18, 1917 She earned a B.S. in home economics from Southern University in 1937 and was the first African American to earn a degree in fashion merchandising from New York University in 1950 and went on to teach fashion and textiles at Spelman College. She married Jacob R. Henderson in Georgia in 1941. From 1944 to 1950 Henderson owned a dress shop in Atlanta. In 1950, Henderson became a fashion editor for the Associated Negro Press and had a fashion column which was syndicated in many black newspapers in America. In 1954, Henderson was the president of The National Association of Black Fashion Designers, a leading organization for women in the industry of fashion. From 1957 to 193, Henderson wrote a syndicated weekly column, “Travel by Freddye,” which ran in the Pittsburgh Courier.

In 1955, Henderson and her husband created the Henderson Travel Service located in Atlanta. It was the first African American travel agency in the Southeast and the first fully accredited black travel agency in America. She planned Martin Luther King Jr's trip to Oslo to accept his Nobel Peace Prize and accompanied him on the trip.In 1957, she notably coordinated the first group of American tourists to West Africa for the celebration of Ghana's independence from the U.K., when Kwame Nkrumah had just been elected the country's first president. Before commercial airlines had begun flying to Africa, Freddye flew the group to Paris and chartered a plane to Africa.

Freddye was also a member of Zeta Phi Beta sorority.

She died on January 19, 2007, after a lengthy illness and was buried at Atlanta's South-View Cemetery.
