= Gilbert Academy =

College-preparatory school in the US

Location
- 5318 St. Charles Avenue, New Orleans, Louisiana; United States; 29.927°N 90.112°W

Information
- Former name: Gilbert Industrial College
- Type: College-preparatory school
- Established: 1873
- Closed: 1949
- Affiliation: New Orleans University

Gilbert Academy was a premier preparatory school for African-American high school students in New Orleans, Louisiana. Begun in 1863 in New Orleans as a home for colored children orphaned by the American Civil War, the home moved to Baldwin, Louisiana, in 1867. The Orphans Home evolved into a school and, over the next 80 years, became Gilbert Academy, a college preparatory school for African Americans. Gilbert Academy returned to New Orleans, achieved accreditation by the Southern Association of Secondary Schools and Colleges, and graduated many notable students until it closed in 1949.

== History ==
=== Civil War origins ===
The Union Army captured New Orleans on April 25, 1862, one year into the American Civil War, and the United States Department of War set up the Department of the Gulf as part of the United States Army. Nathaniel P. Banks, the Gulf Department's second commander, appropriated the vacant mansion of Confederate exile Pierre Soulé on Esplanade Avenue to house the Colored Orphans Home in 1863. Banks appointed fellow Bostonian Louise De Mortie to run the Home (Some sources name De Mortie herself as the founder).

The Orphans Home remained in the Soulé mansion under De Mortie's care until 1866. She fundraised tirelessly, holding concerts and fairs at the Soulé mansion itself and touring the country to raise money until her death from yellow fever in New Orleans in 1867. Banks himself assisted in raising money for the orphanage, as evidenced by his name appearing on the imprint of cartes de visit sold on behalf of the institution.

When the Civil War ended, New Orleans residents returned to reclaim their homes, Pierre Soulé among them. This necessitated finding the Colored Orphans Home new quarters. The Freedmans Bureau, a government agency created in 1865, transferred the children in 1866 to a Marine Hospital being built to replace one destroyed by explosion in 1861. Due to cost overruns and construction problems the hospital was never finished, requiring the children be moved yet again with a year. A combination of private donations and public funds enabled supporters to purchase a former sugar plantation 104 miles west of New Orleans. The orphans were moved there in 1867, to the area that eventually became today's town of Baldwin, Louisiana. The hope was that the Colored Orphans Home could become self-sufficient in its new location. However, promised public funds were withdrawn and a series of setbacks at the plantation made this impossible. Most of the orphans were placed with families by the end of 1874.

=== From orphanage To academy ===
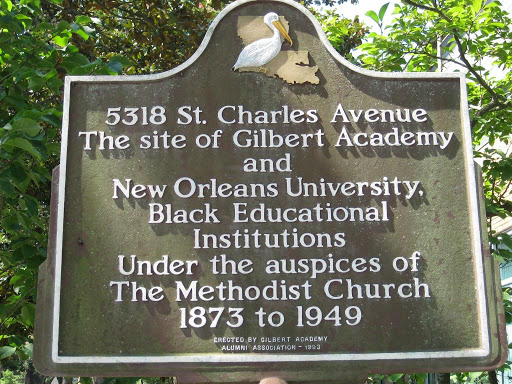
Plaque at site of Gilbert Academy and New Orleans University

As early as 1865 the Methodist Episcopal Church (MEC) began funding free schools across the Southern United States. Overwhelmed by the need the MEC formed the Freedman's Aid Society in 1866. Its primary mission was to support free public schools and train Negro teachers. Under the auspices of the MEC, the former orphanage in Baldwin opened in 1875 as La Teche Seminary. When William L. Gilbert, the owner of Gilbert Clock Factory in Winsted, Connecticut donated $10,000, plus a further $40,000 as an endowment to La Teche, the school's name was changed to Gilbert Seminary in recognition of his gift. (Other sources report Gilbert's initial contribution as $50,000). Over the next few decades, Gilbert Seminary became known variously as Gilbert Academy and Agricultural College, Gilbert Academy and Industrial College, Gilbert Normal and Industrial College and Gilbert Normal Academy.

Six years before La Teche Seminary began, Rev. John P. Newman, again with the help of the MEC, opened the Union Normal School on Camp and Race Streets in New Orleans. In 1873, Rev. Joseph C. Hartzell purchased property on St. Charles Avenue. At the same time he obtained a charter to begin New Orleans University. Newman's Normal School moved to Hartzell's property on St. Charles and New Orleans University began operations. Although Gilbert Academy remained in Baldwin, it became an auxiliary school to New Orleans University. The two schools formed an administrative merger in 1919, with the two institutions remaining in their respective locations. When New Orleans University and Straight College combined to form Dillard University at a new campus in Gentilly in 1935, Gilbert Academy moved into the buildings vacated by New Orleans University.

=== Back To New Orleans ===
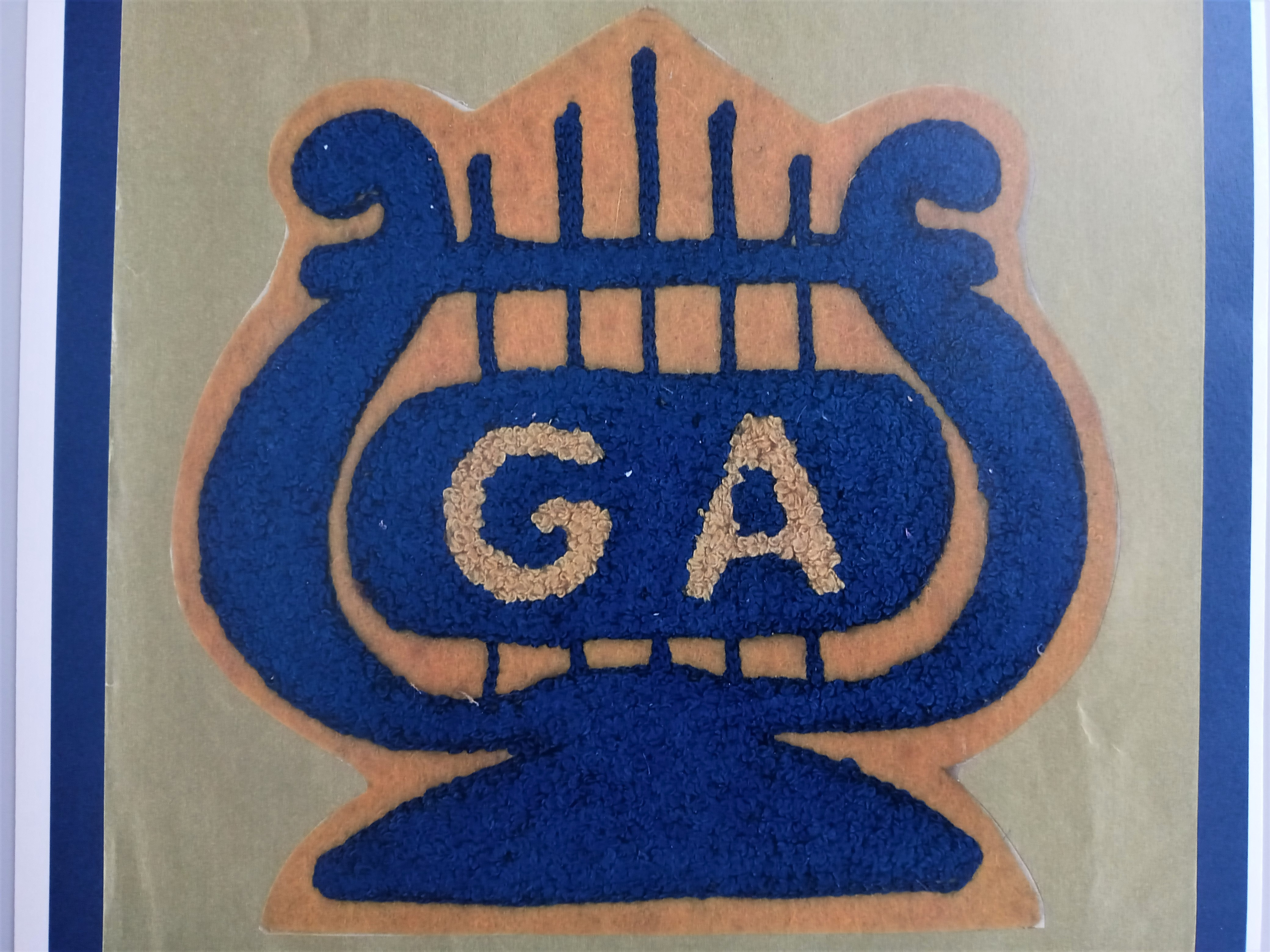
Gilbert Academy band emblem, worn on the front of a blue sweater

Already known for high academic standards while in Baldwin, Gilbert Academy became the premier private, independent college preparatory school for African-American students in New Orleans, the first in the nation accredited by the Southern Association of Secondary Schools and Colleges.

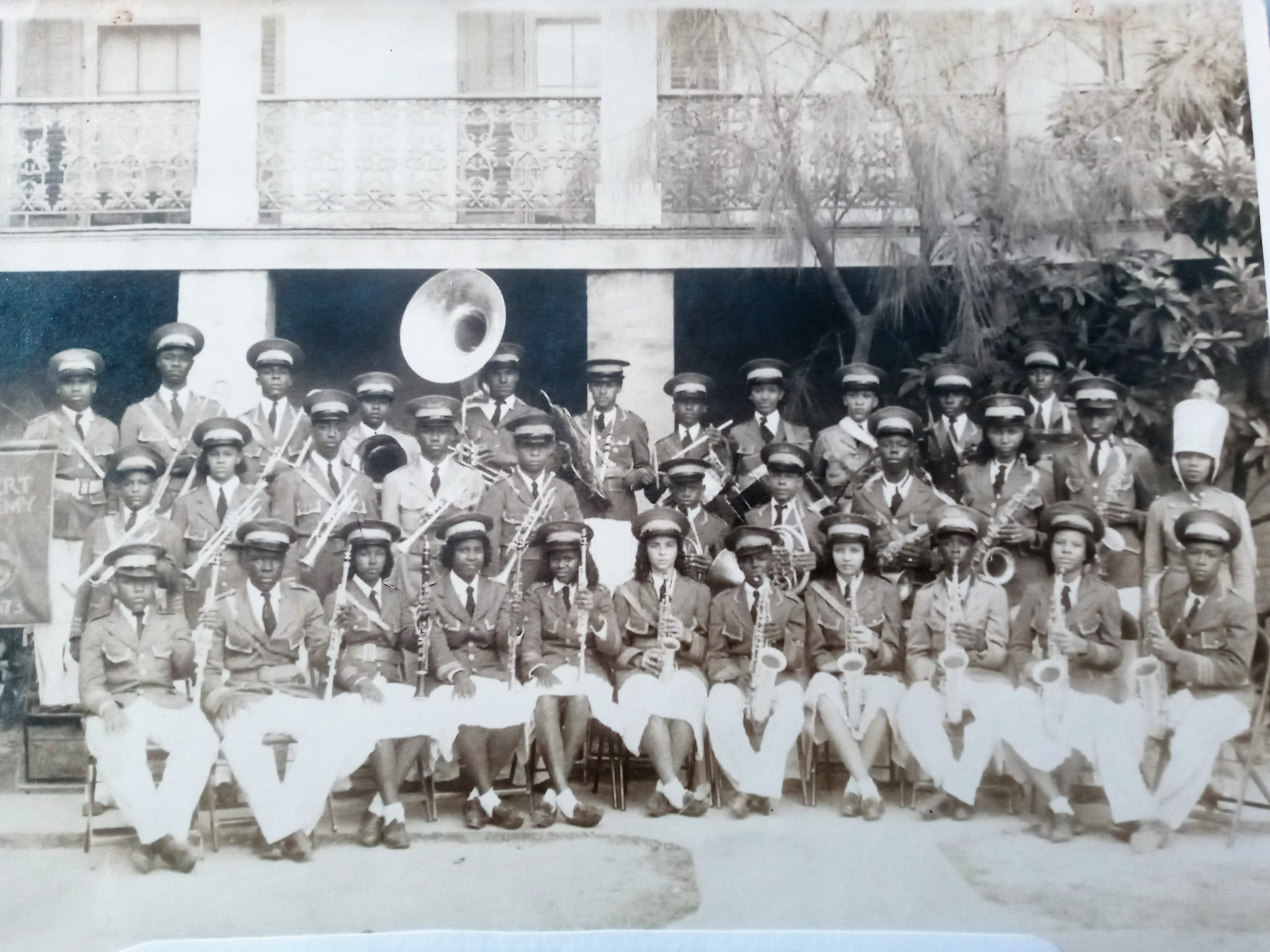
Gilbert Academy Band circa 1947

Well before Gilbert Academy moved to its new home in Uptown New Orleans, as the area became known, the city was undergoing a transformation. Originally rural, improvements to the St. Charles Streetcar Line made the Uptown neighborhood more accessible and one of the most desirable places to live in the city. By the beginning of the 20th century, Uptown became more residential, segregated and expensive. In the 1910s, two African-American universities in the Uptown area left or closed, their land purchased to build homes for the white population wanting to live there. Issues on a more state-wide basis also beset private academies like Gilbert. Research published on Negro education in 1939 reported:

"At least four factors influenced the rapid decline of the schools, namely; (a) inadequacy of support;(b) consolidation with each other, and with public school systems; (c) perpetuation of a feud between publicly and privately supported education which hampered reconciliation, mentioned in b; and (d) the momentum given State-supported education with the reorganization of the State college and the inauguration of the Parish (County) Training School movement, which took place in Louisiana."

=== Closure ===
During its long and distinguished history Gilbert Academy educated students who went on to become important national figures. Margaret Davis Bowen became the Academy's principal about 1935; Marjorie Lee Brown was a mathematics teacher there for a short time; Joseph Henry Reason a language instructor. The school remained at 5318 St. Charles Ave until 1949, graduating its last class in June of that year. A historical plaque stands on the property, placed there by alumni of Gilbert Academy in 1993. It reads:

The site of Gilbert Academy
and
New Orleans University
Black educational institutions
Under the auspices of
The Methodist Church
1873 to 1949

== Athletics ==
=== Championships ===
Football championships

- (1) State Championship: 1945

== Notable alumni ==
Taken from Gilbert Made Lofty Contribution unless otherwise noted.

- Harold Battiste
- Yvonne Busch
- Robert Frederick Collins, United States District Judge
- Thomas Dent (writer)
- Lolis Edward Elie
- Ellis Marsalis Jr
- Audrey "Mickey" Patterson
- Margaret Walker
- John Louis Wilson Jr.
- Andrew Young
