= John Louis Wilson Jr. =

American architect (1898–1989)

- Born: January 24, 1898; Meridian, Mississippi, U.S.
- Died: October 31, 1989 (aged 91); Manhattan, New York, U.S.
- Education: New Orleans University (BA); Columbia University (BArch)
- Occupation: Architect
- Known for: Harlem River Houses (1937)
- Children: Judith Ann Wilson Rogers
- Awards: AIA Whitney Young Award (1984)

John Louis Wilson Jr. (January 24, 1898 – October 31, 1989) was an American architect. He was one of the first African American architects to be registered in New York State. He had worked for New York City Department of Parks and Recreation and also maintained a private architecture practice in the New York City.

== Early life and education ==
John Louis Wilson Jr. was born on January 24, 1898, in Meridian, Mississippi into an African American family. Wilson's father was a minister and his mother was a music teacher. His maternal grandfather had been born into slavery, and because he valued education, he sent his five children to college. He attended elementary school in Meridian, and starting at age 12 he attended Gilbert Academy in New Orleans.

Wilson graduated with a B.A. (1919) from New Orleans University (now Dillard University); and from the Columbia School of Architecture (now Columbia Graduate School of Architecture, Planning and Preservation) with a B.Arch. (1928). He was the first Black graduate of the architecture program at Columbia University.

== Career ==
From 1920 to 1923, he worked as a math teacher and football coach at Philander Smith College in Little Rock, Arkansas. He moved to New York City in 1924 with the intention to attend Columbia University and study architecture. He had to delay his studies due to financial issues and from 1924 until 1926, Wilson worked as a draftsman for architect Vertner Woodson Tandy. By 1928, he had completed his architecture degree.

Wilson began his architectural career in 1929, with the New York City Board of Transportation and on September 24, 1930, he became a registered architect in the state. He was one of the earliest African American architects to be licensed in New York state. In 1933, he set up his own architectural practice in Harlem, and left the New York City Board of Transportation. Wilson maintained his private practice until his retirement in 1980. He had also served as a consulting architect for the New York City Department of Parks and Recreation.

In the 1930s, Wilson was appointed by mayor Fiorello La Guardia to join the architecture team for the design of the Harlem River Houses, but he faced racism and he was not made one of a lead architects. There were seven architects working together on the Harlem River Houses, which was the first federally financed housing project.

In the mid-1950's, Wilson was a founding president of the Council for Advancement of Negroes in Architecture (NACA), which was merged in 1967 with the American Institute of Architects (AIA). He was a fellow of the American Institute of Architects. The New York Coalition of Black Architects honored his work in 1980. In 1984, he was awarded the Whitney M. Young Jr. award by the AIA. Wilson's profile was included in the biographical dictionary African American Architects: A Biographical Dictionary, 1865–1945 (2004).

He died of cancer on October 31, 1989, at Columbia Presbyterian Hospital. His daughter Judith Ann Wilson Rogers (born 1939), is a senior United States circuit judge of the United States Court of Appeals for the District of Columbia Circuit.

== Work ==
- Harlem River Houses (1937), public housing complex, Harlem, New York City, New York; NRHP-listed
- Morris Park Apartments (1960), also known as Mount Morris Park Senior Citizen's Housing Project, a federally funded senior housing complex, 17 E. 124th Street, East Harlem, New York City, New York
- Throg's Neck Library, New York Public Library (1972), 3025 Cross Bronx Expy., The Bronx, New York City, New York
- Early Childhood Center (1975), New York City Board of Education, Brooklyn, New York City, New York

== See also ==
- African-American architects
