= Mont Howell =

American businessman (1866–1944)

- Born: George Montgomery Howell; 1866
- Died: 1944 (aged 77–78)
- Burial place: South-View Cemetery
- Other name: G. M. Howell
- Education: Atlanta University

George Montgomery "Mont" Howell Sr. (1866 – 1944), commonly known as Mont Howell, was an African American businessman in Atlanta, Georgia. He was a member of the executive committee of the National Negro Business League. Howell and his brother Edward operated a shoe store and manufacturer in Atlanta called the "People's Shoe Store".

Howell was a witness to the 1906 Atlanta race massacre; and testified as a witness in the 1928 murder trial of Coleman Osborn, a store owner in Chatsworth, Georgia. He attended Atlanta University (now Clark Atlanta University).
