= Joseph Henry Reason =

American librarian

- Born: March 23, 1905; Franklin, Louisiana
- Died: July 26, 1997 (aged 92); Tallahassee
- Occupations: Librarian, professor
- Known for: Director of the Howard University library system
- Board member of: First African-American to serve as president of the Association of College and Research Libraries
- Children: J. Paul Reason

Joseph Henry Reason (March 23, 1905 – July 26, 1997) was an American librarian. He was director of the Howard University library system for 25 years. He was the first African-American to serve as president of the Association of College and Research Libraries (ACRL) and to be nominated for president of the American Library Association (ALA). In 1999, American Libraries named him one of the "100 Most Important Leaders We Had in the 20th Century". His son, J. Paul Reason, was the first African-American four star Admiral in the United States Navy.

== Early life and education ==
Reason was born in Franklin, Louisiana, the eldest child of Joseph and Bertha Peoples Reason. In 1928, he graduated summa cum laude with a BA in history from New Orleans University and for the 1928–29 school year worked as a language teacher at the Gilbert Academy, a private school for African-Americans in New Orleans. In 1931, he married Bernice Chism. They had two children, Barbara Reason Butler and Joseph Paul Reason. In 1932, he earned a second BA in French from Howard University and in 1936 an MA in French from the University of Pennsylvania. His first published article was in 1934 in Quarterly World on the subject of Tacna-Arica.

== Career ==
Reason entered the library field with the support of John Robert Edward Lee Sr., President of Florida Agricultural and Mechanical University, a black university in Tallahassee. Lee obtained a General Education Board fellowship for Reason so he could earn a BS in library science from Columbia University in 1936. Following a change in FAMU's organizational structure, Lee appointed Reason first director of FAMU's library. Under Reason's administration, the library began its "Negro Collection" preserving African-American cultural materials. This was the genesis of what eventually became the Southeastern Regional Black Archives Research Center and Museum in 1977.

In 1938, Reason was hired as a reference librarian by Howard University. In 1946 he became director of their library system, a post which he held until his retirement in 1971. (In 1946, the post was called University Librarian, changed to Director of Libraries in 1957.) During his lengthy tenure at Howard, Reason oversaw significant increases in the budget, collections, and prestige of the library. The library joined the Federal Depository Library Program in 1963 and the Association of Research Libraries in 1971.

During his time at Howard, he was contributing editor of The Negro College Quarterly from 1941 to 1947. Reason earned a PhD in romance languages from the Catholic University of America in 1956. His dissertation, "An Inquiry Into the Structure, Style, and Originality of Chrestien's Yvain", was published as volume 57 of Studies in Romance Languages and Literature. He took a leave of absence in 1961 to serve as an advisor to the ALA's Social Science Library Project, helping establish a social science library at the University of Rangoon in Burma. He was very active in professional organizations, serving in a variety of capacities, including being the first African-American to be nominated as president of the ALA in 1965 and the first African-American to serve as president of the ACRL in 1971.

In his retirement, he was a visiting professor of library science at Florida State University in Tallahassee and a trustee of Eckerd College in St. Petersburg, Florida. He died in Tallahassee in 1997.
