= South-View Cemetery =

Cemetery in Atlanta, Georgia, US

- Interactive map of South-View Cemetery

Details
- Established: April 21, 1886
- Location: 1990 Jonesboro Rd SE, Atlanta, Georgia
- Country: United States
- Coordinates: 33.702361°N 84.373686°W
- Type: Private
- Size: 100 acres (40 ha)
- No. of interments: 80,000
- Website: https://www.southviewcemetery.com/
- Find a Grave: South-View Cemetery

South-View Cemetery is a historic African-American-founded cemetery located approximately 15 minutes from downtown Atlanta, Georgia. An active operational cemetery on over 100 acres of land, it is the oldest African-American cemetery in Atlanta, Georgia and the oldest African-American “non eleemosynary” corporation in the country. Founded in 1886, it has since served as the burial place for many leaders in the civil rights movement including Ruby Doris Smith-Robinson, Julian Bond, and John Lewis. Martin Luther King Jr. was originally buried here but was later moved to the King National Historic Park in Atlanta.

== History ==
Founded February 1886, the cemetery was an effort of nine African-American businessmen including Jacob McKinley, George W. Graham, Robert Grant, Charles H. Morgan, John Render and Albert Watts, all who wanted a safe, secure place where their family members could be buried with dignity in the midst of backlash to Reconstruction.. The State of Georgia approved its charter in April 1886.

Albert H. Watts, grandson of co-founder Albert Watts, served as Southview Cemetery's President-Treasurer from 1977 until his death in 2001. Current President, Winifred Hemphill, several stockholders, Board members and members of the staff are descendants of the founders.

The cemetery has both perpetual care and non-perpetual care areas. All new lots are sold with perpetual care, but many historic family plots were not. As a result, some portions of the cemetery have "suffered from neglect". A non-profit foundation was created in 2004 to raise money, conduct preservation projects and provide care for historic parts of the cemetery.

A cell phone tour of the cemetery was created in a collaborative effort with Oakland Cemetery to provide biographical details about African Americans interred at the two cemeteries. Visitors can obtain a site map at the visitors center, and each of the 14 stops on the tour is marked with a granite marker. The visitor can call a phone number and dial each stop number as they arrive at it, to hear information.

The cemetery celebrated its 125th anniversary in 2011, and at that time Atlanta mayor Kasim Reed gave it the city's Phoenix Award for its contributions to the city. For many years South-View was paid by the city of Atlanta to provide spaces for African-Americans buried at city expense. The cemetery was listed on the National Register of Historic Places in 2026.

Two printed guidebooks to the cemetery have been published.

== Notable interments ==
Twenty-two people are buried in the cemetery that have or have had schools in the Atlanta Public Schools named for them. With the exception of Martin Luther King Jr., who is buried at the Martin Luther King Jr. National Historical Park, all the deceased pastors of Atlanta's historic Ebenezer Baptist Church are buried here as of 2016.

Veterans who served in every war since World War I are buried in the cemetery, including two members of the Tuskegee Airmen. An annual ceremony as part of Wreaths Across America has been held in December starting in 2010.

Notable people buried here include:

- Hank Aaron (1934–2021), former Major League Baseball Hall of Fame player known for breaking Hall of Famer Babe Ruth's 714 home run record, finishing with 755 career home runs.
- Moses Amos, Georgia's first licensed African-American pharmacist, grandfather of artist Emma Amos
- Ludie Clay Andrews, the first African-American granted a nursing license by Georgia
- Samuel Howard Archer, 5th president of Morehouse College, namesake of several Atlanta Public Schools
- William Barrett, Yusuf Bell, Milton Harvey, Aaron Jackson, Patrick Rogers, Curtis Walker, and Aaron Wyche, who were among the victims of the Atlanta murders of 1979–1981
- Walt Bellamy (1939–2013), a former Naismith Memorial Basketball Hall of Fame professional basketball center in the National Basketball Association who won a gold medal in the 1960 Olympic Games who played fourteen seasons with the Chicago Packers/Zephyrs, Baltimore Bullets, New York Knicks, Detroit Pistons, Atlanta Hawks and New Orleans Jazz. Inducted into the Naismith Memorial Basketball Hall of Fame in 1993, Bellamy was a charter member of the Indiana University Athletic Hall of Fame, inducted in 1982.
- Fred C. Bennette, civil rights leader, aide to Martin Luther King, Jr.
- Jesse B. Blayton, radio entrepreneur and civil rights activist

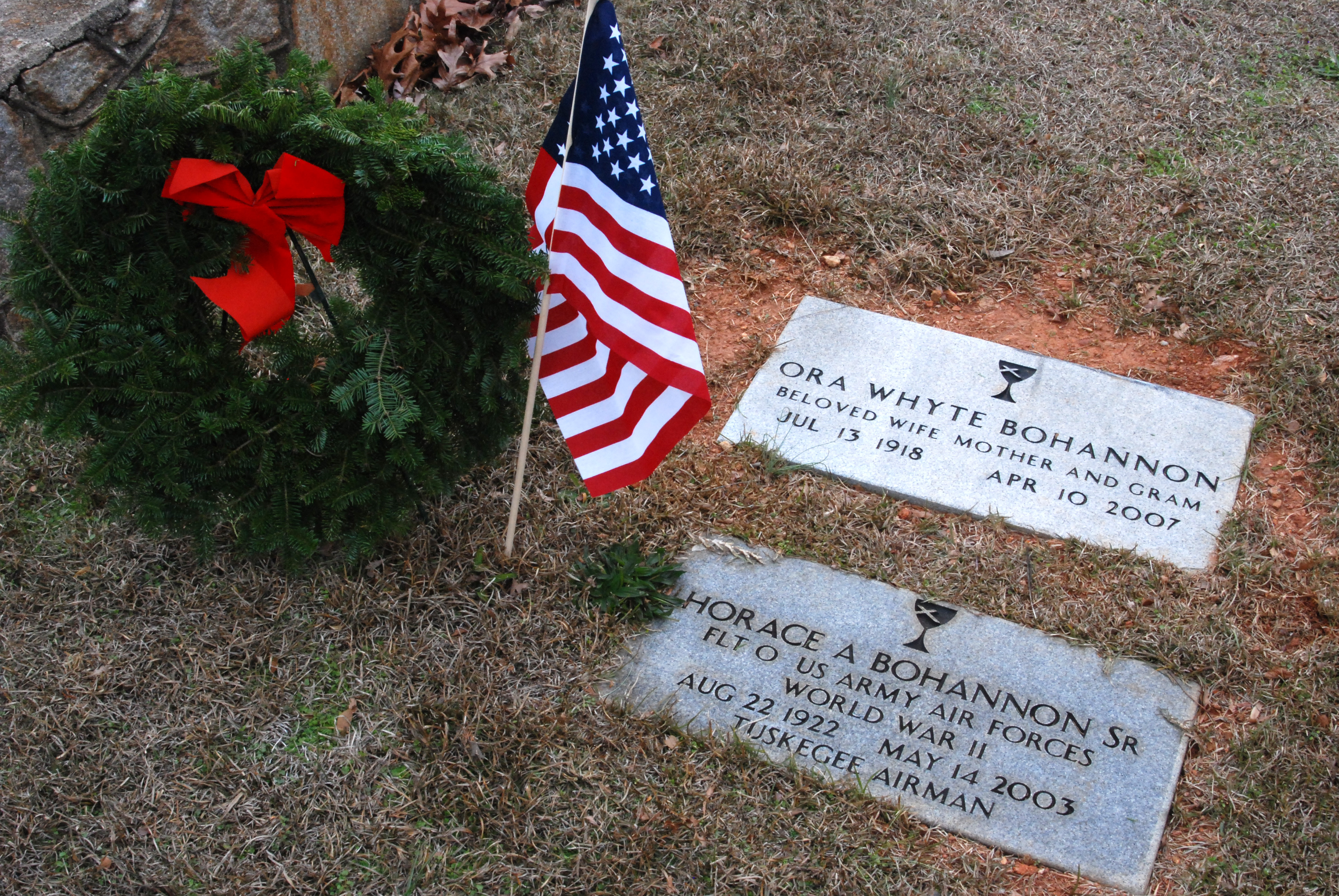

- Horace A. Bohannon, a Tuskegee Airman who co-founded the Atlanta Chapter Tuskegee Airmen in 1976
- Horace Mann Bond, (1904–1972). Noted historian, educator and father of noted Civil Rights leader Julian Bond, He was an influential leader at several historically black colleges and was appointed the first president of Fort Valley State University in Georgia in 1939, where he managed its growth in programs and revenue. In 1945 he became the first African-American president of Lincoln University, Pennsylvania.[1] [2] and president of President of Atlanta University.
- Julian Bond, (1940–2015). Born Horace Julian Bond Jr., Bond was a prominent Civil Rights Leader, former Chairman of the National NAACP, and former Georgia House of Representative who co-founded and lead the Southern Poverty Law Center. He helped found the Student Nonviolent Coordinating Committee.
- William Holmes Borders, civil rights activist, pastor of Wheat Street Baptist Church
- Ariel Serena Hedges Bowen, writer, temperance activist
- John W. E. Bowen Sr., clergyman, educator
- Brailsford R. Brazeal, professor of economics at Morehouse College, civil rights leader
- Larry Brown, graduate of Archer High School and Marshall University football player killed in the Southern Airways Flight 932 crash
- Raymond Holmes Carter, medical doctor who served in World War I, namesake of Atlanta Medical Association's Nash-Carter Award
- Alice Dugged Cary, librarian of the Auburn Avenue library
- Carrie Cunningham, owner of the Royal Peacock Club and Royal Hotel
- Frank Cunningham, president of Morris Brown College
- John Wesley Dobbs, civic leader, unofficial "mayor" of Auburn Avenue
- Mattiwilda Dobbs, opera singer
- Eleanor Guest, original member of Gladys Knight & the Pips
- William Guest, member of Gladys Knight & the Pips
- Grace Towns Hamilton, first African-American woman elected to the Georgia General Assembly
- John and Billie Harden, owners of the Atlanta Black Crackers baseball team
- Charles Lincoln Harper, first principal of Booker T. Washington High School, namesake of several other schools since
- Geneva Haugabrooks, one of a few women business owners in the Sweet Auburn Historic District
- Freddye Scarborough Henderson, created the first black-owned travel agency in the Southeast
- Mont Howell, businessman
- Adrienne McNeil Herndon, educator, actress, wife of Alonzo Herndon
- Alonzo Herndon, one of the first Black millionaires
- John Hicks, jazz pianist
- Jesse Hill, Former President of the Atlanta Life Insurance Company and civil rights activist.
- Graham W. Jackson Sr., organist and pianist
- Virginia Lacy Jones, librarian at Atlanta University
- Alberta Williams King, Martin Luther King Jr.'s mother
- Alfred Daniel Williams King, civil rights leader, brother of Martin Luther King Jr.
- Martin Luther King, Sr., Martin Luther King Jr.'s father
- John Lewis, (1940–2020). Former Georgia's 5th congressional district U.S. Congressman, statesman, and civil rights activist and leader who served as the chairman of the Student Nonviolent Coordinating Committee (SNCC) from 1963 to 1966. Lewis was one of the "Big Six" leaders of groups who organized the 1963 March on Washington. He fulfilled many key roles in the civil rights movement and its actions to end legalized racial segregation in the United States. In 1965, Lewis led the first of three Selma to Montgomery marches across the Edmund Pettus Bridge. In an incident which became known as Bloody Sunday, state troopers and police attacked the marchers, including Lewis.
- Red McAllister, band leader and saxophonist
- Homer Erwin Nash, doctor who served in World War I, namesake of Nash-Carter Award, father of Helen Elizabeth Nash
- Dinah Watts Pace, educator
- John Andrew Parker, first pastor of Ebenezer Baptist Church
- Duke Pearson, jazz pianist and composer
- Donald Reeves, professional baseball player
- Ruby Doris Smith-Robinson, civil rights activist
- Herman J. Russell, entrepreneur, civic leader, philanthropist
- Frank Smith and George Wilder, victims of the Atlanta Massacre of 1906
- Nathaniel Patrick Tillman, educator and administrator at Morehouse College and Atlanta University
- George Alexander Towns, educator at Atlanta University, civil rights activist, father of Grace Towns Hamilton
- Henry McNeal Turner, minister and politician, one of the Original 33
- Bazoline Estelle Usher, long-time Atlanta Public Schools educator

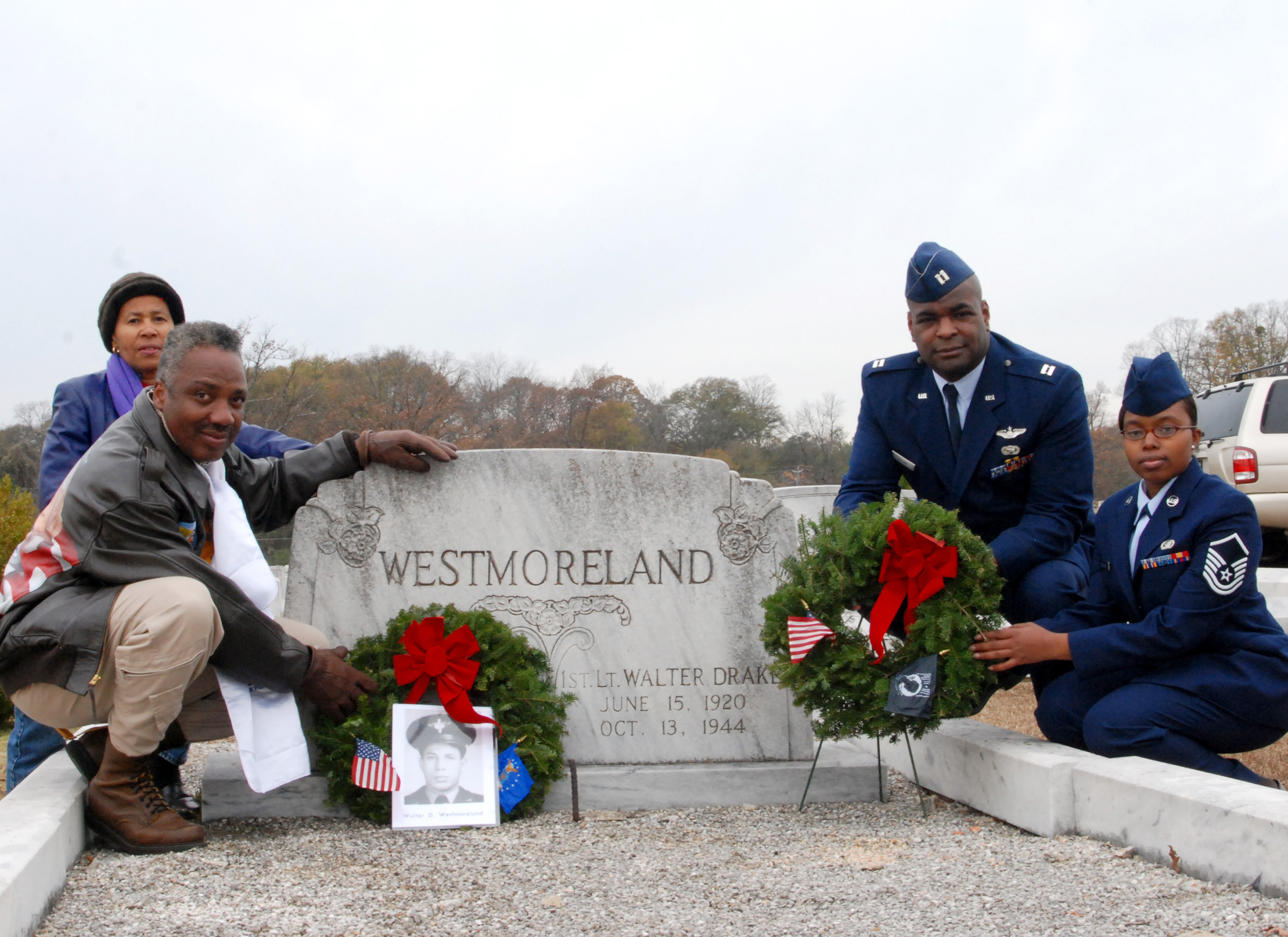

- Walter Drake Westmoreland, a Tuskegee Airman who received the Air Medal and Purple Heart
- Albery Allson Whitman, minister, poet, orator known as "Poet Laureate of the Negro Race". Also father to the Whitman Sisters.
- Whitman Sisters Alberta, Essie and Mabel, famous Black Vaudeville performers
- Samuel Woodrow Williams, minister, professor and civil rights activist
- Chuck Willis, singer, songwriter
- Billy Wright, blues singer
- Asa G. Yancey Sr., medical doctor and educator
- Jean Childs Young, educator, wife of Andrew Young

== Former interments ==
- Martin Luther King Jr. was moved to a tomb at the eventual site of the King Center for Nonviolent Social Change on January 13, 1970.
- Henry Ossian Flipper was reburied in his hometown of Thomasville, Georgia on February 11, 1978.
- Benjamin Mays and his wife Sadie Gray Mays were moved to the Morehouse College campus on May 21, 1995.

== Sources and further reading ==
- Bayne, John S. (2016). Atlanta's South-View Cemetery. Atlanta: Vanity Press. ISBN 978-1312735293. OCLC 962488589.
- Henderson, D.L. (2018). South-View: An African American City of the Dead. Dunwoody, Georgia: Carrelspin Press. ISBN 978-0998577203. OCLC 1048552699.
- Hite, Michelle S. (2016). "Finding the Back Entrance Unsuitable: Liberation, Pedagogy, and South-View Cemetery". Transformations: The Journal of Inclusive Scholarship and Pedagogy. 26 (2): 272–282. doi:10.5325/trajincschped.26.2.0272. JSTOR 10.5325/trajincschped.26.2.0272.
- Fisher, W. D.; Buckley, Joann H. (2016). African American Doctors of World War I: The Lives of 104 Volunteers. Jefferson: McFarland & Company. pp. 60–63, 163–165. ISBN 978-1476663159. OCLC 1066103319 – via Google Books.
- Spencer, Thomas E. (1998). Where They're Buried: A Directory Containing More Than Twenty Thousand Names of Notable Persons Buried in American Cemeteries, with Listings of Many Prominent People Who Were Cremated. Baltimore: Clearfield Co. ISBN 978-0806348230. OCLC 1036925754 – via Google Books.
