= J. Paul Reason =

U.S. naval officer

Joseph Paul Reason
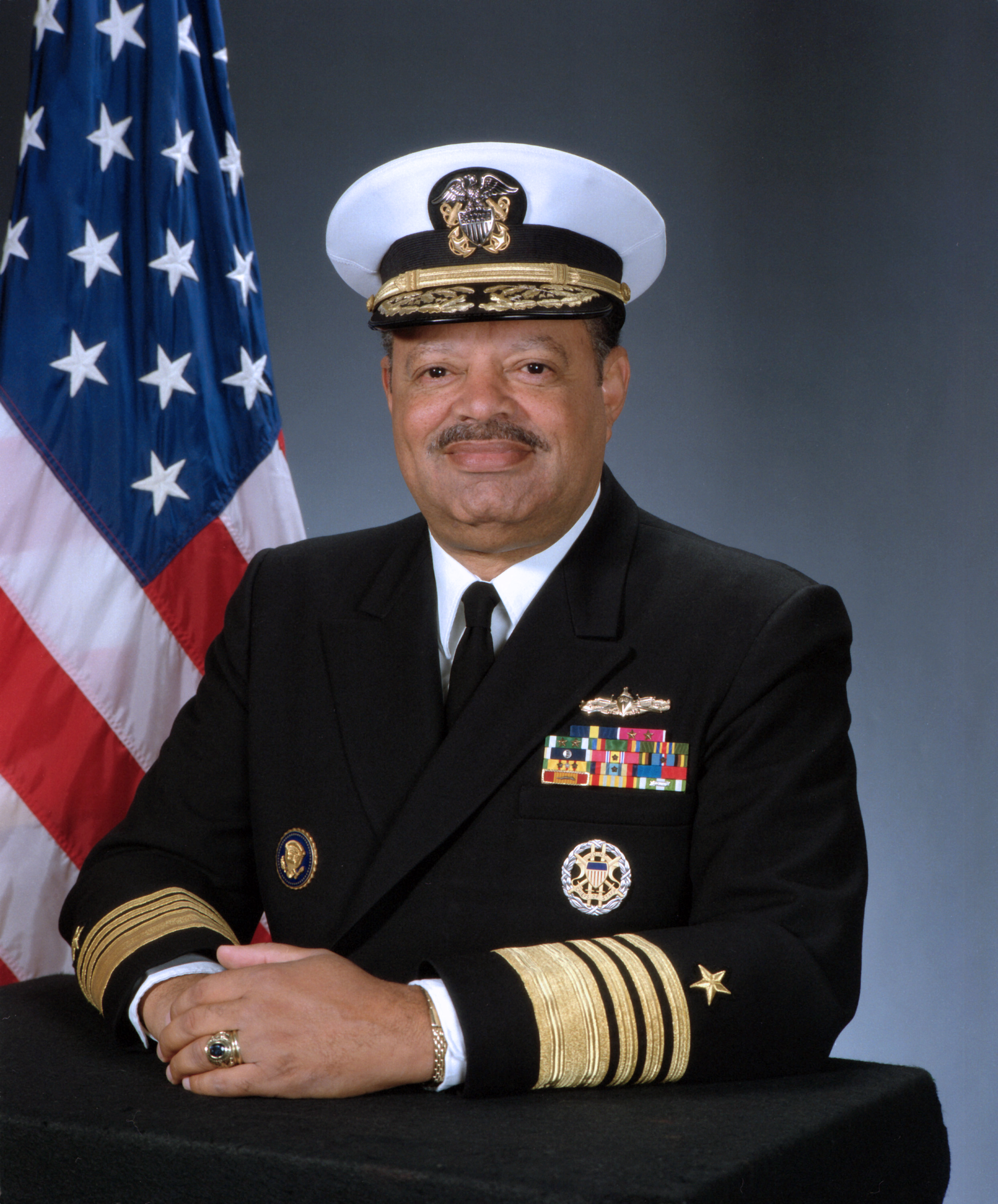
- Admiral Joseph Paul Reason (1996)
- Born: March 22, 1941 (age 85); Washington, D.C., U.S.
- Military career
- Allegiance: United States of America
- Branch: United States Navy
- Service years: 1965–1999
- Rank: Admiral
- Commands: USS Coontz (DDG-40), USS Bainbridge (CGN-25), Naval Base, Seattle, Washington, Cruiser-Destroyer Group One, Battle Group Romeo, Naval Surface Forces, U.S. Atlantic Fleet, United States Atlantic Fleet
- Conflicts: Vietnam War
- Awards: Navy Distinguished Service Medal, Legion of Merit
- Other work: Vice President for Ship Systems at SYNTEK Technologies, Inc., President and COO, and Vice Chairman of Metro Machine Corp, Secretary of the Navy's Advisory Subcommittee on Naval History

Joseph Paul Reason (born March 22, 1941, in Washington, D.C.) was Commander in Chief, United States Atlantic Fleet from 1996 to 1999. Earlier in his career, as a commander, he was naval aide to the President of the United States, Jimmy Carter, from December 1976 to June 1979. In 1996, Reason became the first African-American officer in the United States Navy to become a four-star admiral.

== Family, early life, and education ==
The son of Joseph Henry Reason, a professor of Romance languages and director of libraries at Howard University, and his wife, Bernice, a high school teacher of biology, Reason grew up in a multiracial environment, living from 1944 in a home on Girard Street, NE, in Washington, D.C. He participated in an integrated Boy Scout troop and attended McKinley Technology High School, spending a period every summer at a camp on Lake Winnipesaukee in New Hampshire. In 1957–58, during his senior year in high school, Reason became interested in the Naval Reserve Officer Training Corps, but was not selected although he ranked second out of 300 applicants. Following this rejection, he spent his freshman year at Swarthmore College, his sophomore year at Lincoln University (Pennsylvania), and his junior year at Howard University. As he was completing his junior year at Howard University, Congressman Charles Diggs, Jr., (D-MI), contacted him and encouraged him to apply to the United States Naval Academy. Accepted for the Naval Academy Class of 1965, Reason reported to Annapolis as a midshipman on 28 June 1961 and graduated with a Bachelor of Science degree in naval science and a commission as an ensign on 9 June 1965. Three days later, he married Dianne Lillian Fowler in the Naval Academy Chapel. They have a son and a daughter.

== Naval career ==
Following his commissioning, from June to September 1965, Reason served as operations officer in USS J. Douglas Blackwood (DE-219), before attending the Naval Nuclear Power School at United States Naval Training Center Bainbridge from September 1965 to March 1966, then attended the Naval Nuclear power training Unit at Schenectady, New York from March to September 1966. On completion of his nuclear power training, Reason was assigned to USS Truxtun (CGN-35) and participated in the ship's first deployment to Southeast Asia in 1968 during the Vietnam War. In September 1969, he entered the Naval Postgraduate School as a student, where he earned a Master of Science degree in computer systems management.

In December 1970, Reason was assigned to the nuclear aircraft carrier USS Enterprise (CVN-65), in which he served until January 1973, making two deployments to the Southeast Asian and Indian Ocean areas. From January to August 1973, he attended the Naval Destroyer School at Naval Station Newport, Rhode Island, followed by the Combat System Technical Schools Command at Mare Island from August 1973 through January 1974.

Returning to USS Truxtun (CGN-35), Reason served as her combat systems officer from January 1974 until June 1976. On completion of this sea assignment, Reason became a detailer for Surface Nuclear Junior Officer Assignment and Placement Branch, Bureau of Naval Personnel in Washington until December 1976, when he was assigned to the White House as Naval Aide to the President of the United States, Jimmy Carter.

In June 1979, he became executive officer of USS Mississippi (CGN-40) and remained in that post until May 1981, when he was ordered to the Surface Warfare Officers School Command at Newport, Rhode Island in preparation for assignment in command of USS Coontz (DDG-40). Taking up his first command in September 1981, he remained in USS Coontz (DDG-40), until December 1982. From sea duty, he was assigned to Naval Reactors, Department of Energy for instruction until April 1983, when he took command of the nuclear-powered guided missile cruiser USS Bainbridge (CGN-25) until July 1986, during which period he was promoted to captain on 1 October 1983.

Selected for promotion to rear admiral (lower half) on 26 June 1986, he served as commander, Naval Base, Seattle, Washington from July 1986 to September 1988, in which position he was responsible for all naval activities in the states of Washington, Oregon, and Alaska. Returning to sea duty, he commanded Cruiser-Destroyer Group 1 until November 1990, then, promoted to rear admiral (upper half). At the same time, he commanded Battle Group Romeo aboard the flagship USS New Jersey (BB-62) in operations in the Pacific, Indian Ocean, and Persian Gulf regions. Following his selection to Vice Admiral in 1991, he commanded Naval Surface Forces, U.S. Atlantic Fleet, from January 1991 to July 1994.

From August 1994 to November 1996, Reason served as Deputy Chief of Naval Operations, Plans, Policy, and Operations (N3/N5). In November 1996, he was selected for promotion to four-star admiral and assigned as Commander in Chief, United States Atlantic Fleet until he retired from active duty in 1999.

== Post-military career ==
Reason was vice president for ship systems at SYNTEK Technologies, Inc. of Arlington, Virginia, from the end of his naval service in 1999 until 2000. He then became president and COO, and vice chairman of Metro Machine Corp., a ship repair company, from 2000 to 2006.

He has been a director of Amgen, Inc., Norfolk Southern Corporation, Wal-Mart Stores, Inc., Todd shipyards, as well as a member of the Oak Ridge Associated Universities, and the National War Powers Commission. In 2008, he was appointed to a four-year term as a member of the Secretary of the Navy's Advisory Subcommittee on Naval History.

In 2019, Reason donated his 42-foot fishing boat, the Sea Dog, to the Potomac Riverkeeper Network to use in conducting regular water quality tests of the Potomac River in Reason's native Washington, D.C.

== Published works ==
- Sailing new seas by J. Paul Reason with David G. Freymann. Newport Paper, no, 13 (Newport: Naval War College Press, 1998).

== Decorations and medals ==
United States decorations and medals

Navy Distinguished Service Medal
Legion of Merit (3)
Navy Commendation Medal (3)
Navy Unit Commendation Medal, awarded to USS Enterprise (CVN-65)
Navy Meritorious Unit Commendation Ribbon, awarded to USS Mississippi (CGN-40)
Navy "E" Ribbon (4)
National Defense Service Medal (3)
Armed Forces Expeditionary Medal (1)
Vietnam Service Medal (8 campaign stars)
Navy Sea Service Deployment Ribbon (4)

Foreign decorations

Republic of Vietnam Armed Forces Honor Medal, First Class
Republic of Vietnam Gallantry Cross Unit Citation Ribbon
Republic of Vietnam Campaign Medal

- The Venezuelan Navy's La Medalla Naval Almirante Luis Brión
