= Dinah Watts Pace =

American teacher

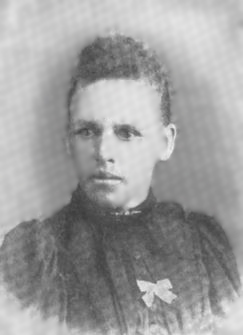
- Born: Dinah Watts; January 9, 1853; Athens, Clarke County, Georgia
- Died: January 25, 1933 (aged 80); Atlanta, Georgia
- Education: Atlanta University, 1883

Dinah Watts Pace (1853–1933) was an American educator who founded black schools in Covington, Georgia and later founded the Covington Colored Children's Orphanage, which she ran for over forty years. Raised as a slave, she received her diploma in education from Atlanta University and gained a nationwide reputation for her charitable work with orphans.

== Early life ==
Dinah Watts Pace was born enslaved on January 9, 1853, near Athens, Clarke County, Georgia to Emily and Sterling Watts, as the property of the Alexander family. By the time she was eight years old, Mrs. Alexander headed the household and was running a boarding house with around twelve 12 slaves. Watts and her siblings tried their best to learn as they were able. When the Civil War ended, Watts located to Atlanta, and lived in the Summerhill neighborhood, which at the time was the center of black society. While still a child, she was one of the founders of the Sunday school for the Pleasant Grove Baptist Church, which would later become the Reed Street Baptist Church and currently is known as the Paradise Missionary Baptist Church. After five years of attending Sunday schools, Watts entered Atlanta University and graduated in 1883.

== Career ==
After graduating from university, in 1883, Watts went to Covington, Georgia for what was to be a short few months of teaching. Recognizing the need for education in that part of the state, she founded a school and began teaching. In 1884, she took in two young orphans and soon other abandoned children followed. That same year, she met a widower, James Pace, a local blacksmith and coffin maker. After his assurance that he would allow her to continue with her work, the two were married. In 1886, Pace resigned her teaching post to devote her time to raising funds for her orphans. She traveled the state trying to secure funds. In 1890, she incorporated the Covington Colored Orphans Home with the goal of providing care, education and training for orphans or abandoned children who had no one to care for them. Perhaps her most steadfast benefactor was her brother, Lewis Watts, a Pullman porter. He sent her portions of his pay to support her educational endeavors and helped her not only pay rent on the house she lived in, but helped her acquire the lot to build her orphanage on, as well as construct four buildings to house her 100 students. A sorority from Wellesley College took on the orphanage as a project and sent boxes of food and clothing.

Watts spoke widely at events to raise funds for her students, such as participating in events with W.E.B. DuBois and the Conference on Problems of Negro City Life held at Atlanta University, among others. Her work was widely covered in the black press nationwide and articles appeared in The Crisis about the orphanage. With $1000 seed money from Sarah M. Reed (Mrs. A. C. Reed) of Manchester Vermont, Pace began constructing the Reed Home and School, a two and a half-story, ten room facility. Eventually, Pace employed three Atlanta University graduates, including her niece Anne Mae Watts, to work at the school. Then in 1916, a benefactor from Boston donated funds to create the Annie Woods Memorial Hall, as a dormitory for boys, though the following year, her girls' dormitory was damaged by fire. Soon after the fire, James Pace died.

Pace continued to operate the school until her death, but struggled as she aged to keep it running without her fundraising. Her niece, Annie Mae Watts took over the school and ran it for two more years after Watts died, but then it was closed. The county later burned the buildings on the property and all that is left there is a green space and cemetery. A plaque at the Washington Street Community Center recognizes the importance of Pace and her school to Newton County history.

== Death and legacy ==
Pace died on January 25, 1933, at the Douglass Infirmary in Atlanta as a result of burns sustained in an accidental fire on January 21, 1933, at her home in Covington. She was buried at South-View Cemetery in Atlanta, after her funeral service was held at the Reed Street Baptist Church, which she had helped establish. She came to be known as the "Mother of the Community" for her work as a social activist and business woman, but perhaps her biggest legacy was the education she provided for the more than 700 students who passed through her school.
