= Ariel Serena Hedges Bowen =

African-American writer, temperance activist, and professor of music

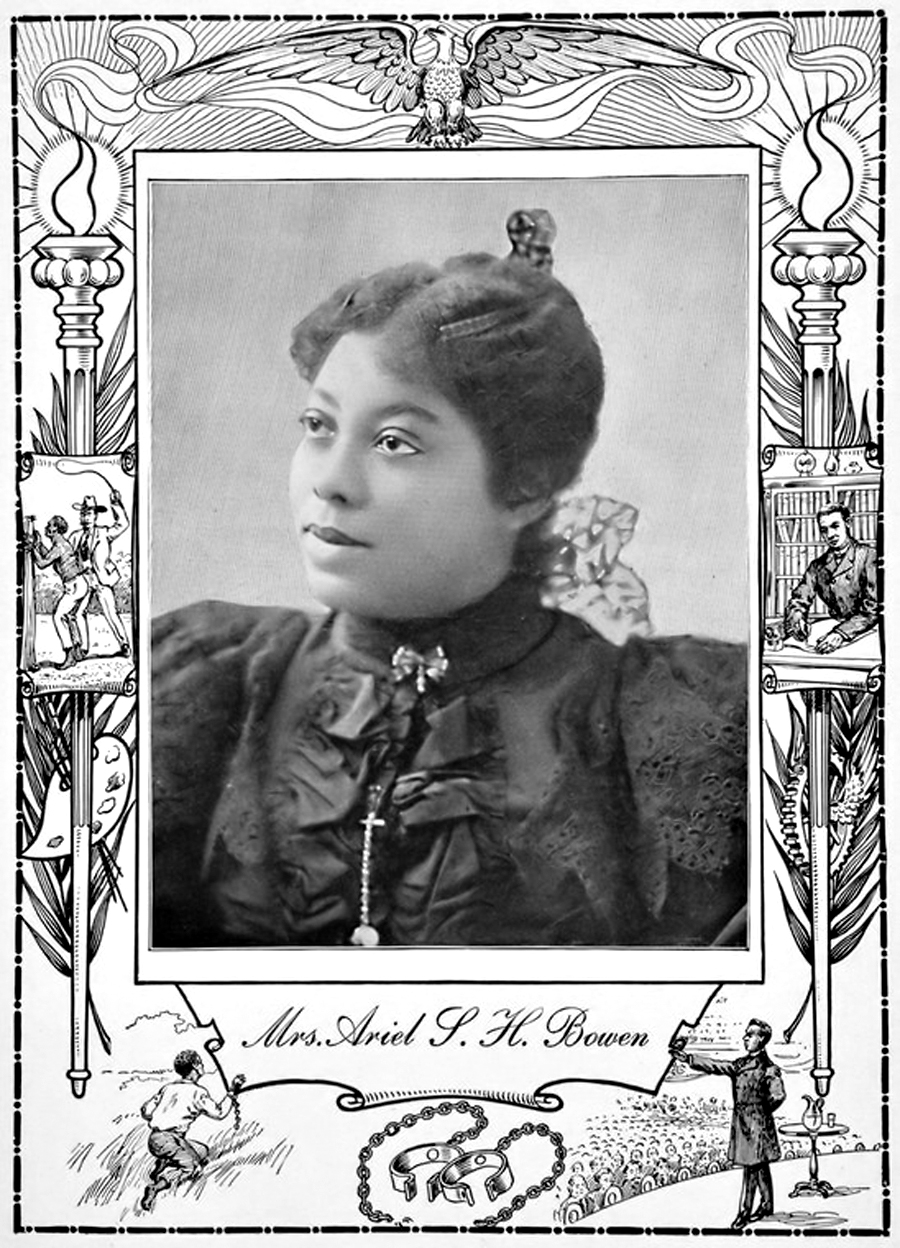
- Ariel Serena Hedges Bowen, circa 1880s
- Born: Ariel Serena Hedges; March 3, 1863; Newark, New Jersey
- Died: July 7, 1904 (aged 41)
- Occupations: activist, writer, professor of music
- Spouse: John W. E. Bowen Sr.
- Children: 4

Ariel Serena Hedges Bowen (March 3, 1863 – July 7, 1904) was an African-American writer, temperance activist, and professor of music at Clark University in Atlanta in the late 19th and early 20th centuries. Twentieth Century Negro Literature (1902) noted that "she is regarded as one of the foremost and best cultured women of her race." She was a life member of the Woman's Foreign Missionary Society of the Methodist Episcopal Church.

== Early ==
In 1863, Ariel Serena Hedges was born in Newark, New Jersey where her father, Charles Hedges, was a Presbyterian clergyman. He was an 1869 graduate of Lincoln University in Pennsylvania and he had organized churches in New York State. Her mother represented one of the oldest Presbyterian families of that state. Her grandfather was a bugler in the Mexican war, and was a Guard of Honor when Lafayette revisited the United States.

Her parents moved to Pittsburgh, where she attended the Avery Institute and completed the academic course at this school. Her parents then moved to Baltimore, where her father became pastor of Madison Avenue Presbyterian Church, and finally of Grace Presbyterian Church. She was sent to high school in Springfield, Massachusetts where she remained, and they graduated her with honor in 1885. She also took the Teachers' Course and Examination and passed a creditable examination, afterwards being favorably considered as teacher for one of the schools of that city. She then taught History and English Language at the Tuskegee Institute in Tuskegee, Alabama under Booker T. Washington. She could read Greek, Latin, and German.

In 1886, Hedges married Dr. John W. E. Bowen of the Gammon Theological Seminary in Atlanta. She became a life member of the Woman's Foreign Missionary Society of the Methodist Episcopal Church. She moved to Atlanta with her husband in 1893, where the couple raised a family of four children (one son and three daughters).

Bowen became Professor of Music at Clark University in 1895, writing broadly on music (Music in the Home), as well as being an accomplished vocalist and musician with the piano and pipe organ.

Bowen also was a notable figure in the Southern Women's Christian Temperance Union, writing The Ethics of Reform and serving as state president of the Georgia W. C. T. U., No. 2.

Ariel Bowen Memorial United Methodist Church in Atlanta, Georgia is named in her memory.
