= Robert O'Shaughnessy =

American politician (1918–1991)

Robert E. O'Shaughnessy
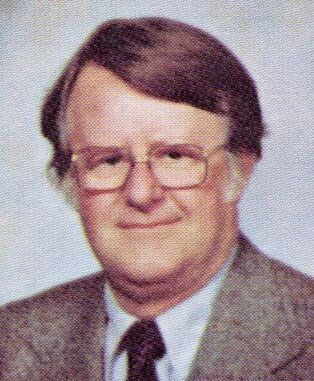

Member of the Ohio Senate from the 15th district
- In office October 2, 1972 – December 31, 1978
- Preceded by: Jerry O'Shaughnessy
- Succeeded by: John Kasich

Personal details
- Born: Robert Emmet O'Shaughnessy; February 23, 1918 Columbus, Ohio
- Died: February 16, 1991 (aged 72) Columbus, Ohio
- Party: Democratic

Robert Emmet O'Shaughnessy Sr. (February 23, 1918 – February 16, 1991) was an American Democratic politician, member of the Ohio Senate, and Funeral Director. A member of a political family, O'Shaughnessy was initially appointed to the Senate to succeed his brother, Jerry O'Shaughnessy, who had died. In 1974, O'Shaughnessy overcame a divisive primary and a challenge by Republican Keith McNamara to retain the seat. He subsequently was appointed as Chairman of the Senate Energy Committee.

In 1978, O'Shaughnessy faced opposition in John Kasich, a political newcomer. In the end, he lost his seat to Kasich, ending his tenure in the Senate at seven years.

After his defeat, he opted to become Clerk of the Senate, however was not chosen. Subsequently, he returned to his family funeral home business in Columbus, Ohio; he had worked as a Funeral Director for over fifty years. He died in 1991, at the age of 72.

He is the father of the Maryellen O'Shaughnessy, Franklin County Clerk of Courts.
