= Jerry O'Shaughnessy =

American politician

Member of the Ohio Senate from the 15th district
- In office January 5, 1971 – August 23, 1972
- Preceded by: John W. Bowen
- Succeeded by: Robert O'Shaughnessy

Personal details
- Born: October 7, 1906 Columbus, Ohio
- Died: December 16, 1972 (aged 66) Columbus, Ohio
- Party: Democratic

Jerry O'Shaughnessy (October 7, 1906 – December 15, 1972) was a Democratic politician who formerly served in the Ohio General Assembly. O'Shaughnessy began his political career as a member of the Ohio House of Representatives in the 1960s. In 1966, he opted to run for the newly districted 15th District of the Ohio Senate, but lost by a mere 249 votes to Republican John W. Bowen.

In 1970, O'Shaughnessy again ran for the Senate seat, however, this time he was successful. He defeated Bowen, and took his seat on January 5, 1971. However, less than two years into his term, O'Shaughnessy died of a heart attack. He was sixty six years old. He was succeeded by his brother, Robert O'Shaughnessy.
