= New Orleans University =

Historically black college (1869–1935)

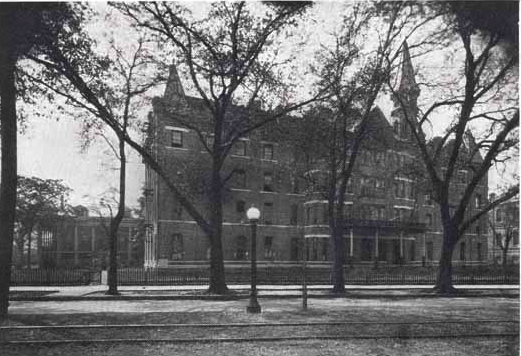
- New Orleans University c. 1920
- Former name: New Orleans College
- Type: Private, HBCU
- Active: 1869–1935
- Affiliations: Gilbert Academy
- Location: New Orleans, Louisiana, United States; 29.927°N 90.112°W

New Orleans University was a historically black college that operated between 1869 and 1935 in New Orleans, Louisiana, United States. It was founded by Freedmen's Aid Society and the Methodist Episcopal Church. It merged with Straight College in 1935 to form Dillard University.

== History ==
New Orleans University was founded in 1869 by the Freedmen's Aid Society with funds from the Methodist Episcopal Church. It was located above Canal Street (present-day Lower Garden District), at Camp and Race streets in New Orleans. In the year 1869, sixteen schools for African Americans were active in the New Orleans area. It later moved to 5318 St. Charles Avenue, near what is presently Jefferson Avenue.

New Orleans University was considered an auxiliary school to the Gilbert Academy, a prestigious college-preparatory school for African-American students in New Orleans. The two schools formed an administrative merger in 1919, with the two institutions remaining in their respective locations. When New Orleans University and Straight College combined to form Dillard University at a new campus in Gentilly in 1935, Gilbert Academy moved into the buildings vacated by New Orleans University.

== Athletics ==
1920 New Orleans University football team

New Orleans University offered varsity athletics. The nickname for the university's sports teams was Tigers.

=== Football ===
New Orleans University fielded a college football team from 1914 through 1935.

== Notable alumni ==
- William Talbot Handy (1894–1983), American Methodist minister
- John Louis Wilson Jr. (1898–1989), American architect
