= Washington Park, Atlanta =

- Washington Park Historic District
- U.S. National Register of Historic Places
- U.S. Historic district
- Location within Atlanta Location within Georgia Location within the United States
- Location: Jct. of Martin Luther King, Jr. Dr. and Ashby St., Atlanta, Georgia
- Coordinates: 33°45′36″N 84°25′16″W
- Built: 1919
- Architectural style: Late 19th And 20th Century Revivals, Bungalow/Craftsman
- NRHP reference No.: 00000071
- Added to NRHP: February 28, 2000

Washington Park is a historically black neighborhood in northwest Atlanta encompassing historic residential, commercial, and community landmark buildings. It is situated two miles (3 km) west of the central business district of Atlanta. The combination of gridiron and curvilinear streets is a result of the neighborhood having been developed from four separate subdivision plats. One of these plats created Atlanta's first planned black neighborhood, while the other three were abandoned by white developers and adopted by Heman Perry, an early 20th-century black developer. Although Perry did not receive a formal education past the seventh grade, in 1913 he founded one of the largest black-owned companies in the United States, the Standard Life Insurance Company of Atlanta.

== History ==
The development of the Washington Park area is associated with the history of racial segregation in Atlanta. Prior to 1919, Ashby Street functioned as an early "color line" in the city. The area east of Ashby Street was established as an area for African Americans, and the area west of Ashby Street was established as an area for white settlement. Few white families were interested in residing so close to the historically black Atlanta University campus. Any plans for white settlement west of Ashby Street ended when the general manager of the Parks Department of Atlanta designated Washington Park as the first recreational park for African Americans in 1919. The Atlanta Board of Education re-designated Ashby Street School from white to black in that same year. With these two actions, the area west of Ashby Street was abandoned by white developers and this early "color line" was broken.

The collection of historic residences within the district consists of one- and two-story buildings built between 1919 and 1958 featuring exterior wood clapboard or brick veneer. These close-knit residences are fairly uniformly set back near the street-end of their narrow lots. The architectural types represented within the district include English and Georgian cottages, Georgian, American Foursquare, and the bungalow, the most commonly found type. The architectural styles found include Colonial Revival, English Vernacular, and Craftsman, which is the style most widely represented. There were few commercial buildings located within the Washington Park neighborhood, historically concentrated near the edges of the district at the crossroads of major streets, but many of these stores have been lost or altered. A c. 1930 gas station featuring an office block with a canopy remains, as well as a corner store with a large storefront window oriented towards the intersection. Community landmarks include the William A. Harris Memorial Hospital, the Ashby Street Theater, the Citizen Trust Company West Side Branch bank building, and the E.R. Carter Elementary School (formerly Ashby Street School).

== Washington Park ==
One of the focal points of the historic district is the recreational park. Prior to the construction of Washington Park in 1919, there were no recreational parks in Atlanta available to African Americans. The park started with a gift of six and a half acres and expanded to 25 acres (100,000 m^{2}) when completed in 1928. It originally included a swimming pool, dance hall, pavilions, and tennis courts. Branch Curington, appointed by Mayor Ivan Allen in 1964, was the first Director/Manager of Washington Park Tennis Center in 1964. Mr. Curington is also known for being the first black tennis pro to direct/manage a tennis facility in Atlanta. Washington Park saw thousands of black youth in Atlanta learn, play and earn tennis scholarships to college due to the amazing offensive "serve and volley" style of tennis Branch Curington coached to his players. Roscoe "Rocky" Warner, a local teaching pro in Atlanta whose father was coached by Mr. Curington, is building an amazing timeline on Branch Curington's life and his contributions to Washington Park in Atlanta Georgia. Mr. Curington was the first African-American in Georgia to be certified as a tennis teaching professional, and many of the city’s black elite would take lessons from him on their lunch breaks. Despite his accomplishments, it was not until 2016 that Mr. Curington was inducted in the Georgia Tennis Hall of Fame. Mr. Curington would die a year later July 14, 2017. The Washington Park neighborhood has retained many of its landscape features; however, mass transportation projects, modern residential construction and subsidized housing development have caused the loss of some historic fabric.

== Transportation ==
The neighborhood is served by PATH's "West Side Trail", the Beltline (which will connect to the park as well) and access to the Ashby MARTA rail station.

This article incorporates text from the National Park Service website, a work of the U.S. government, and therefore under public domain.
