= Edmond Robinson =

American football player (born 1992)

No. 51, 53, 46, 48
- Position: Linebacker

Personal information
- Born: February 23, 1992 (age 34); Wadmalaw Island, South Carolina, U.S.
- Listed height: 6 ft 3 in (1.91 m)
- Listed weight: 245 lb (111 kg)

Career information
- High school: St. John's (Johns Island, South Carolina)
- College: Newberry
- NFL draft: 2015: 7th round, 232nd overall pick

Career history
- Minnesota Vikings (2015–2016); New York Jets (2017); Arizona Cardinals (2017); Arizona Hotshots (2019); Houston Roughnecks (2020); Atlanta Falcons (2020); New York Jets (2021)*; Seattle Seahawks (2021); Arlington Renegades (2023)
- * Offseason or practice squad member only

Awards and highlights
- XFL champion (2023)

Career NFL statistics
- Total tackles: 29
- Stats at Pro Football Reference

Edmond Robinson Jr. (born February 23, 1992) is an American former professional football player who was a linebacker in the National Football League (NFL). He played college football for the Newberry Wolves. He was selected by the Minnesota Vikings in the seventh round of the 2015 NFL draft.

== Early life ==
Robinson was born to Edmond Robinson Sr. and Rev. Annabelle Robinson, a pastor in the African Methodist Episcopal (AME) Church. He was raised in Wadmalaw Island, South Carolina, home to the last working tea plantation in the United States. He attended St. Johns High School in Johns Island, South Carolina, where he was a three-sport athlete, participating in football, basketball and track.

== College career ==
At Newberry College, Robinson started 29 of 41 games, finishing his career with 200 tackles (137 solos), 2.5 sacks for minus 23 yards, 23.5 stops for losses of 80 yards and three quarterback pressures. He also caused two fumbles and recovered three others, advancing two for a total of 16 yards.

In 2013, Robinson was named All-South Atlantic Conference First-team at linebacker. He had 69 total tackles (12 for loss), including 42 solo stops, 2.5 sacks, one forced fumble and an interception.

In 2014, Robinson was Newberry's leading tackler on the season with 68 tackles (7.5 for loss), five pass breakups, two fumble recoveries and a quarterback hurry.

== Professional career ==
=== Pre-draft ===
Pre-draft measurables
| Height | Weight | 40-yard dash | 10-yard split | 20-yard split | 20-yard shuttle | Three-cone drill | Vertical jump | Broad jump | Bench press |
|---|---|---|---|---|---|---|---|---|---|
| 6 ft 3 in (1.91 m) | 245 lb (111 kg) | 4.61 s | 1.61 s | 2.69 s | 4.38 s | 7.49 s | 37 in (0.94 m) | 10 ft 1 in (3.07 m) | 20 reps |
All values from NFL Combine

Robinson's arm length of 34 inches and hand size of 101/4 inches ranked among the largest for linebackers at the combine. His vertical jump (37 inches), 40-yard dash (4.61 seconds) and standing broad jump (121 inches) all were top-10 performances among the 34 linebackers in attendance.

=== Minnesota Vikings ===
Robinson was selected by the Minnesota Vikings in the seventh round, 232nd overall pick in the 2015 NFL draft. He was the first NCAA Division II player to be selected in that year's draft. He is the first Newberry alumnus selected in the NFL draft since 1974, when Greg Hartle was taken with the No. 251 overall pick in the 10th round by the then St. Louis Cardinals. He signed a four-year, $2,348,314 deal that included a $68,314 signing bonus that is all guaranteed.

In the Vikings' loss to the Arizona Cardinals in Week 15 of the 2015 season, Robinson started at strong-side linebacker with Anthony Barr out due to a groin injury and was credited with one tackle and a pass defensed. He played 26 of 67 snaps on defense as he came off the field in passing situations. A week later in the Vikings' blowout win over the New York Giants, he recorded five tackles despite playing just six snaps on defense.

On September 2, 2017, Robinson was released by the Vikings for final roster cuts.

=== New York Jets (first stint) ===
Robinson was claimed off waivers by the New York Jets on September 3, 2017. He was waived/injured on September 16, 2017, and placed on injured reserve. He was released on December 19, 2017.

=== Arizona Cardinals ===
On December 22, 2017, Robinson was signed to the practice squad of the Arizona Cardinals. He was promoted to the active roster on December 26, 2017. Robinson was waived by the Cardinals on September 1, 2018.

=== Arizona Hotshots ===
In 2018, Robinson signed with the Arizona Hotshots of the Alliance of American Football for the 2019 season. The league ceased operations in April 2019.

=== Houston Roughnecks ===
In October 2019, Robinson was picked by the Houston Roughnecks of the XFL in the 2020 XFL draft. After the 2020 XFL season was cut short, Robinson was placed on the reserve/other league list on March 28, 2020. He had his contract terminated when the league suspended operations on April 10, 2020.

=== Atlanta Falcons ===
On March 30, 2020, Robinson signed with the Atlanta Falcons of the NFL. He was waived on September 5, 2020, and signed to the practice squad the next day. He was elevated to the active roster on September 26, October 10, October 17, October 24, October 29, and November 7 for the team's weeks 3, 5, 6, 7, 8, and 9 games against the Chicago Bears, Carolina Panthers, Minnesota Vikings, Detroit Lions, Panthers, and Denver Broncos, and reverted to the practice squad after each game. On November 10, he was signed to the 53-man roster.

=== New York Jets (second stint) ===
On August 6, 2021, Robinson signed with the Jets. He was waived on August 24, 2021.

=== Seattle Seahawks ===
On November 16, 2021, Robinson was signed to the Seattle Seahawks practice squad.

=== Arlington Renegades ===
On November 17, 2022, Robinson was selected by the Arlington Renegades of the XFL. He was placed on the reserve list on April 3, 2023, and activated on May 8. He was released on January 30, 2024.

=== NFL statistics ===
| Regular season statistics | | | | Tackles | | | | | Interceptions | | | | | | Fumbles | | |
| Season | Team | GP | GS | Comb | Total | Ast | Sck | Sfty | PDef | Int | Yds | Avg | Lng | TDs | FF | FR | FR YDS |
|---|---|---|---|---|---|---|---|---|---|---|---|---|---|---|---|---|---|
| 2015 | MIN | 9 | 2 | 10 | 7 | 3 | 0.0 | 0 | 1 | 0 | 0 | 0.0 | 0 | 0 | 0 | 0 | 0 |
| 2016 | MIN | 12 | 2 | 2 | 1 | 1 | 0.0 | 0 | 1 | 0 | 0 | 0.0 | 0 | 0 | 0 | 0 | 0 |
| 2017 | ARI | 1 | 1 | 1 | 1 | 0 | 0.0 | 0 | 0 | 0 | 0 | 0.0 | 0 | 0 | 0 | 0 | 0 |
| 2020 | ATL | 13 | 13 | 15 | 8 | 7 | 0.0 | 0 | 0 | 0 | 0 | 0.0 | 0 | 0 | 0 | 0 | 0 |
| 2021 | SEA | 3 | 0 | 1 | 0 | 1 | 0.0 | 0 | 0 | 0 | 0 | 0.0 | 0 | 0 | 0 | 0 | 0 |
| Career | | 38 | 18 | 29 | 17 | 12 | 0.0 | 0 | 2 | 0 | 0 | 0 | 0 | 0 | 0 | 0 | 0 |
