= Southern Christian Leadership Conference =

African-American civil rights organization

- Abbreviation: SCLC
- Formation: January 10, 1957
- Type: NGO
- Purpose: Civil rights
- Headquarters: Atlanta, Georgia
- Region served: United States
- President/CEO: DeMark Liggins
- Affiliations: 17 affiliates; 57 chapters
- Staff: 60
- Website: nationalsclc.org

The Southern Christian Leadership Conference (SCLC) is an African-American civil rights organization based in Atlanta, Georgia. SCLC is closely associated with its first president, Martin Luther King Jr., who had a large role in the American civil rights movement.

== Founding ==
On January 10, 1957, after the victory of the Montgomery bus boycott against the white establishment, Pastor Martin Luther King invited some sixty black pastors and leaders to Atlanta's Ebenezer Church. Among the principal guests were pastors Charles Kenzie Steele and Fred Shuttlesworth and activist Bayard Rustin.

Prior to this, Rustin, in New York City, conceived the idea of initiating such an effort and first sought C. K. Steele to make the call and take the lead role. Steele declined, but told Rustin he would be glad to work right beside him if he sought King in Montgomery for the role. Their goal was to form an organization to coordinate and support nonviolent direct action as a method of desegregating bus systems across the South. In addition to King, Rustin, Ella Baker, and Steele, Fred Shuttlesworth of Birmingham, Joseph Lowery of Mobile, and Ralph Abernathy of Montgomery, all played key roles in this meeting. The group continued this initial meeting on January 11, calling it (in keeping with the recent bus segregation issue) a Southern Negro Leaders Conference on Transportation and Nonviolent Integration when they held a press conference that day. The press conference allowed them to introduce their efforts:

- communicating what they had included in telegrams sent that day to applicable members of the executive branch of the U.S. government (President Eisenhower, Vice President Nixon, and Attorney General Brownell)
- sharing an outline of their overall position regarding restrictions against the "elementary democratic rights [of America's] Negro minority"
- and providing a short list of concerns they wished to raise with "white Southerners of goodwill".

On February 13-14, a follow-up meeting was held in New Orleans, at the New Zion Baptist Church at the corner of Third and LaSalle Streets. Out of this meeting came a new organization with King as its president. Shortening the name used for their January meetings, the group briefly called their organization Negro Leaders Conference on Nonviolent Integration, then Southern Negro Leaders Conference and also Southern Leadership Conference. King served as president, Steele as first vice president, A.L. Davis as second vice president, T. J. Jemison as secretary, Medgar Evers as assistant secretary, Abernathy as treasurer, and Shuttlesworth as historian. At its third meeting, in August 1957, the group settled on Southern Christian Leadership Conference (SCLC) as its name, expanding its focus beyond buses to ending all forms of segregation. A small office was established in the Prince Hall Masonic Temple Building on Auburn Avenue in Atlanta with Ella Baker as SCLC's first—and for a long time only—staff member.

SCLC was governed by an elected board, and established as an organization of affiliates, most of which were either individual churches or community organizations such as the Montgomery Improvement Association and the Alabama Christian Movement for Human Rights (ACMHR). This organizational form differed from the National Association for the Advancement of Colored People (NAACP) and the Congress of Racial Equality (CORE) who recruited individuals and formed them into local chapters.

The organization also drew inspiration from the crusades of evangelist Billy Graham, who befriended King after he appeared at a Graham crusade in New York City in 1957. Despite tactical differences, which arose from Graham's willingness to continue affiliating himself with segregationists, the SCLC and the Billy Graham Evangelistic Association had similar ambitions and Graham would privately advise the SCLC.

During its early years, SCLC struggled to gain footholds in black churches and communities across the South. Social activism in favor of racial equality faced fierce repression from the police, White Citizens' Council and the Ku Klux Klan. Only a few churches had the courage to defy the white-dominated status-quo by affiliating with SCLC, and those that did risked economic retaliation against pastors and other church leaders, arson, and bombings.

SCLC's advocacy of boycotts and other forms of nonviolent protest was controversial among both whites and blacks. Many black community leaders believed that segregation should be challenged in the courts and that direct action excited white resistance, hostility, and violence. Traditionally, leadership in black communities came from the educated elite—ministers, professionals, teachers, etc.—who spoke for and on behalf of the laborers, maids, farmhands, and working poor who made up the bulk of the black population. Many of these traditional leaders were uneasy about involving ordinary blacks in mass activity such as boycotts and marches.

SCLC's belief that churches should be involved in political activism against social ills was also deeply controversial. Many ministers and religious leaders—both black and white—thought that the role of the church was to focus on the spiritual needs of the congregation and perform charitable works to aid the needy. To some of them, the social-political activity of King and SCLC amounted to dangerous radicalism which they strongly opposed.

=== Citizenship Schools ===
Originally started in 1954 by Esau Jenkins and Septima Clark on the Sea Islands off the coast of South Carolina and Georgia, the Citizenship Schools focused on teaching adults to read so they could pass the voter-registration literacy tests, fill out driver's license exams, use mail-order forms, and open checking accounts. Under the auspices of the Highlander Folk School (now Highlander Research and Education Center) the program was expanded across the South. The Johns Island Citizenship School was housed at The Progressive Club, listed on the National Register of Historic Places in 2007.

According to Septima Clark's autobiography, Echo In My Soul (page 225), the Highlander Folk School was closed because it engaged in commercial activities in violation its charter; Highlander Folk School was chartered by the State of Tennessee as a non-profit corporation without stockholders or owners. However, in 1961, the Highlander staff reincorporated as the Highlander Research and Education Center and moved to Knoxville. Under the innocuous cover of adult-literacy classes, the schools secretly taught democracy and civil rights, community leadership and organizing, practical politics, and the strategies and tactics of resistance and struggle, and in so doing built the human foundations of the mass community struggles to come.

Eventually, close to 69,000 teachers, most of them unpaid volunteers and many with little formal education taught Citizenship Schools throughout the South. Many of the Civil Rights Movement's adult leaders such as Fannie Lou Hamer and Victoria Gray, and hundreds of other local leaders in black communities across the South attended and taught citizenship schools.

Under the leadership of Clark, the citizenship school project trained over 10,000 citizenship schoolteachers who led citizenship schools throughout the South, representing a popular education effort on a massive scale. On top of these 10,000 teachers, citizenship schools reached and taught more than 25,000 people. By 1968, over 700,000 African Americans became registered voters thanks to Clark's dedication to the movement.

As a result of the SCLC acquiring the already-established Citizenship Schools program, as its director, Clark became the first woman allowed a position on the SCLC board, despite continued resistance from the other (exclusively male) SCLC leaders. Andrew Young, who had joined Highlander the previous year to work with the Citizenship Schools, also joined the SCLC staff. The SCLC staff of citizenship schools were overwhelmingly women, as a result of the daily experience gained by becoming a teacher.

Clark would struggle against relentless sexism and male supremacy during her time on the SCLC, much as Ella Baker had, with particularly harsh sexism emanating from Martin Luther King Jr. himself. Ralph Abernathy also objected to a woman being allowed to participate in SCLC decision making and leadership, as Clark said:

I can remember Reverend Abernathy asking many times, why was Septima Clark on the Executive Board of the Southern Christian Leadership Conference? And Dr. King would always say, "She was the one who proposed this citizenship education which is bringing to us not only money but a lot of people who will register and vote." And he asked that many times. It was hard for him to see a woman on that executive body.

Clark attested that deliberate and widespread discrimination and even overt suppression of women was "one of the greatest weaknesses of the civil rights movement."

=== Albany Movement ===
In 1961 and 1962, SCLC joined SNCC in the Albany Movement, a broad protest against segregation in Albany, Georgia. It is generally considered the organization's first major nonviolent campaign. At the time, it was considered by many to be unsuccessful: despite large demonstrations and many arrests, few changes were won, and the protests drew little national attention. Yet, despite the lack of immediate gains, much of the success of the subsequent Birmingham Campaign can be attributed to lessons learned in Albany.

=== Birmingham campaign ===
By contrast, the 1963 SCLC campaign in Birmingham, Alabama, was an unqualified success. The campaign focused on a single goal—the desegregation of Birmingham's downtown merchants—rather than total desegregation, as in Albany. The brutal response of local police, led by Public Safety Commissioner "Bull" Connor, stood in stark contrast to the nonviolent civil disobedience of the activists.

After his arrest in April, King wrote the "Letter from Birmingham Jail" in response to a group of clergy who had criticized the Birmingham campaign, writing that it was "directed and led in part by outsiders" and that the demonstrations were "unwise and untimely." In his letter, King explained that, as president of SCLC, he had been asked to come to Birmingham by the local members:

I think I should indicate why I am here in Birmingham, since you have been influenced by the view which argues against "outsiders coming in." I have the honor of serving as president of the Southern Christian Leadership Conference, an organization operating in every southern state, with headquarters in Atlanta, Georgia. We have some eighty-five affiliated organizations across the South, and one of them is the Alabama Christian Movement for Human Rights. ... Several months ago the affiliate here in Birmingham asked us to be on call to engage in a nonviolent direct-action program if such were deemed necessary. We readily consented, and when the hour came we lived up to our promise. So I, along with several members of my staff, am here because I was invited here I am here because I have organizational ties here.

King also addressed the question of "timeliness":

One of the basic points in your statement is that the action that I and my associates have taken in Birmingham is untimely. ... Frankly, I have yet to engage in a direct-action campaign that was "well timed" in the view of those who have not suffered unduly from the disease of segregation. For years now I have heard the word "Wait!" It rings in the ear of every Negro with piercing familiarity. This "Wait" has almost always meant "Never." We must come to see, with one of our distinguished jurists, that "justice too long delayed is justice denied." We have waited for more than 340 years for our constitutional and God-given rights.

The most dramatic moments of the Birmingham campaign came on May 2, when, under the direction and leadership of James Bevel, who would soon officially become SCLC's Director of Direct Action and Director of Nonviolent Education, more than 1,000 Black children left school to join the demonstrations. Hundreds were arrested. Known as the Children's Crusade, 2,500 more students came back the following day to again march, and they were met by Bull Connor with police dogs and high-pressure fire hoses. That evening, television news programs reported to the nation and the world scenes of fire hoses knocking down schoolchildren and dogs attacking individual demonstrators. Public outrage led the Kennedy administration to intervene more forcefully and a settlement was announced on May 10, under which the downtown businesses would desegregate and eliminate discriminatory hiring practices, and the city would release the jailed protesters.

=== March on Washington ===
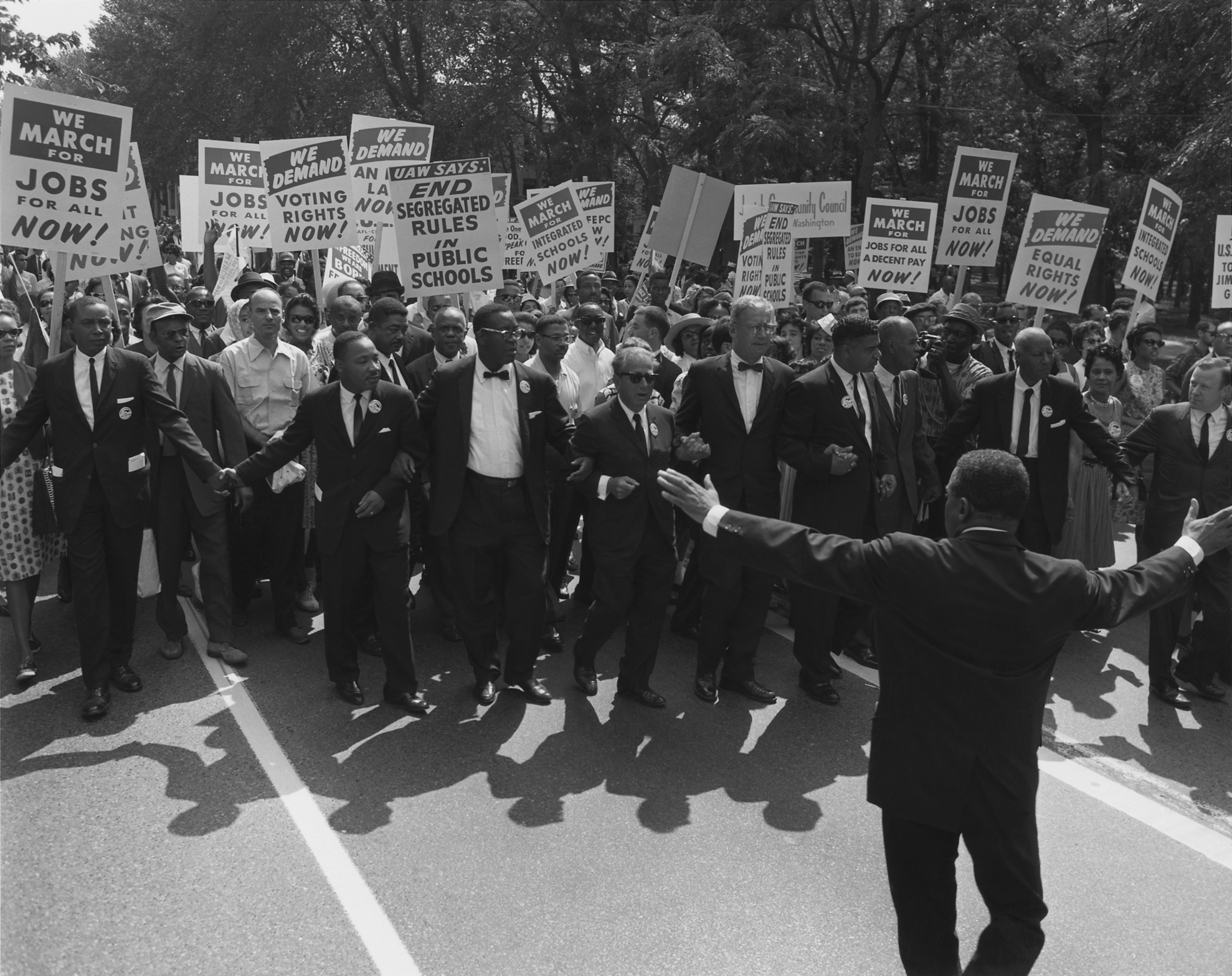
Martin Luther King Jr. at the March on Washington

After the Birmingham Campaign, SCLC called for massive protests in Washington, DC, to push for new civil rights legislation that would outlaw segregation nationwide. A. Philip Randolph and Bayard Rustin issued similar calls for a March on Washington for Jobs and Freedom. On July 2, 1963, King, Randolph, and Rustin met with James Farmer Jr. of the Congress of Racial Equality, John Lewis of SNCC, Roy Wilkins of the NAACP, and Whitney Young of the Urban League to plan a united march on August 28.

The media and political establishment viewed the march with great fear and trepidation over the possibility that protesters would run riot in the streets of the capital. But despite their fears, the March on Washington was a huge success, with no violence, and an estimated number of participants ranging from 200,000 to 300,000. It was also a logistical triumph—more than 2,000 buses, 21 special trains, 10 chartered aircraft, and uncounted autos converged on the city in the morning and departed without difficulty by nightfall.

The crowning moment of the march was King's famous "I Have a Dream" speech in which he articulated the hopes and aspirations of the Civil Rights Movement and rooted it in two cherished gospels—the Old Testament and the unfulfilled promise of the American creed.

=== St. Augustine protests ===
When civil rights activists protesting segregation in St. Augustine, Florida were met with arrests and Ku Klux Klan violence, the local SCLC affiliate appealed to King for assistance in the spring of 1964. SCLC sent staff to help organize and lead demonstrations and mobilized support for St. Augustine in the North. Hundreds were arrested on sit-ins and marches opposing segregation, so many that the jails were filled, and the overflow prisoners had to be held in outdoor stockades. Among the northern supporters who endured arrest and incarceration were Mrs. Malcolm Peabody, the mother of the governor of Massachusetts and Mrs. John Burgess, wife of the Episcopal Bishop of Massachusetts.

Nightly marches to the Old Slave Market were attacked by white mobs, and when blacks attempted to integrate "white-only" beaches they were assaulted by police who beat them with clubs. On June 11, King and other SCLC leaders were arrested for trying to lunch at the Monson Motel restaurant, and when an integrated group of young protesters tried to use the motel swimming pool the owner poured acid into the water. TV and newspaper stories of the struggle for justice in St. Augustine helped build public support for the Civil Rights Act of 1964 that was then being debated in Congress.

=== Selma Voting Rights Movement and the march to Montgomery ===
When voter registration and civil rights activity in Selma, Alabama were blocked by an illegal injunction, the Dallas County Voters League (DCVL) asked SCLC for assistance. King, SCLC, and DCVL chose Selma as the site for a major campaign around voting rights that would demand national voting rights legislation in the same way that the Birmingham and St. Augustine campaigns won passage of the Civil Rights Act of 1964. In cooperation with SNCC who had been organizing in Selma since early 1963, the Voting Rights Campaign commenced with a rally in Brown Chapel on January 2, 1965, in defiance of the injunction. SCLC and SNCC organizers recruited and trained blacks to attempt to register to vote at the courthouse, where many of them were abused and arrested by Dallas County Sheriff Jim Clark—a staunch segregationist. Black voter applicants were subjected to economic retaliation by the White Citizens' Council, and threatened with physical violence by the Ku Klux Klan. Officials used the discriminatory literacy test to keep blacks off the voter rolls.

Nonviolent mass marches demanded the right to vote and the jails filled up with arrested protesters, many of them students. On February 1, King and Abernathy were arrested. Voter registration efforts and protest marches spread to the surrounding Black Belt counties—Perry, Wilcox, Marengo, Greene, and Hale. On February 18, an Alabama State Trooper shot and killed Jimmie Lee Jackson during a voting rights protest in Marion, county seat of Perry County. In response, James Bevel, who was directing SCLC's Selma actions, called for a march from Selma to Montgomery, and on March 7 close to 600 protesters attempted the march to present their grievances to Governor Wallace. Led by Reverend Hosea Williams of SCLC and John Lewis of SNCC, the marchers were attacked by State Troopers, deputy sheriffs, and mounted possemen who used tear-gas, horses, clubs, and bullwhips to drive them back to Brown Chapel. News coverage of this brutal assault on nonviolent demonstrators protesting for the right to vote—which became known as "Bloody Sunday"—horrified the nation.

King, Bevel, Diane Nash and others called on clergy and people of conscience to support the black citizens of Selma. Thousands of religious leaders and ordinary Americans came to demand voting rights for all. One of them was James Reeb, a white Unitarian Universalist minister, who was beaten to death on the street by Klansmen who severely injured two other ministers in the same attack.

After more protests, arrests, and legal maneuvering, Federal Judge Frank M. Johnson ordered Alabama to allow the march to Montgomery. It began on March 21 and arrived in Montgomery on the 24th. On the 25th, an estimated 25,000 protesters marched to the steps of the Alabama capitol in support of voting rights where King spoke. Within five months, Congress and President Lyndon Johnson responded to the enormous public pressure generated by the Selma Voting Rights Movement by enacting into law the Voting Rights Act of 1965.

=== Grenada Freedom Movement ===
When the Meredith Mississippi March Against Fear passed through Grenada, Mississippi, on June 15, 1966, it sparked months of civil rights activity on the part of Grenada blacks. They formed the Grenada County Freedom Movement (GCFM) as an SCLC affiliate, and within days 1,300 blacks registered to vote.

Though the Civil Rights Act of 1964 had outlawed segregation of public facilities, the law had not been applied in Grenada which still maintained rigid segregation. After black students were arrested for trying to sit downstairs in the "white" section of the movie theater, SCLC and the GCFM demanded that all forms of segregation be eliminated, and called for a boycott of white merchants. Over the summer, the number of protests increased and many demonstrators and SCLC organizers were arrested as police enforced the old Jim Crow social order. In July and August, large mobs of white segregationists mobilized by the KKK violently attacked nonviolent marchers and news reporters with rocks, bottles, baseball bats and steel pipes.

When the new school year began in September, SCLC and the GCFM encouraged more than 450 black students to register at the formerly white schools under a court desegregation order. This was by far the largest school integration attempt in Mississippi since the Brown v. Board of Education ruling in 1954. The all-white school board resisted fiercely, whites threatened black parents with economic retaliation if they did not withdraw their children, and by the first day of school the number of black children registered in the white schools had dropped to approximately 250. On the first day of class, September 12, a furious white mob organized by the Klan attacked the black children and their parents with clubs, chains, whips, and pipes as they walked to school, injuring many and hospitalizing several with broken bones. Police and Mississippi State Troopers made no effort to halt or deter the mob violence.

Over the following days, white mobs continued to attack the black children until public pressure and a Federal court order finally forced Mississippi lawmen to intervene. By the end of the first week, many black parents had withdrawn their children from the white schools out of fear for their safety, but approximately 150 black students continued to attend, still the largest school integration in state history at that point in time.

Inside the schools, blacks were harassed by white teachers, threatened and attacked by white students, and many blacks were expelled on flimsy pretexts by school officials. By mid-October, the number of blacks attending the white schools had dropped to roughly 70. When school officials refused to meet with a delegation of black parents, black students began boycotting both the white and black schools in protest. Many children, parents, GCFM activists, and SCLC organizers were arrested for protesting the school situation. By the end of October, almost all of the 2600 black students in Grenada County were boycotting school. The boycott was not ended until early November when SCLC attorneys won a Federal court order that the school system treat everyone equal regardless of race and meet with black parents.

=== Jackson conference ===
In 1966, Allen Johnson hosted the Tenth Annual Southern Christian Leadership Conference at the Masonic Temple in Jackson, Mississippi. The theme of the conference was human rights - the continuing struggle. Those in attendance, among others, included: Edward Kennedy, James Bevel, Martin Luther King Jr., Ralph Abernathy, Curtis W. Harris, Walter E. Fauntroy, C. T. Vivian, Andrew Young, The Freedom Singers, Charles Evers, Fred Shuttlesworth, Cleveland Robinson, Randolph Blackwell, Annie Bell Robinson Devine, Charles Kenzie Steele, Alfred Daniel Williams King, Benjamin Hooks, Aaron Henry and Bayard Rustin.

== 1968–1997 ==
In August 1967, the Federal Bureau of Investigation (FBI) instructed its program "COINTELPRO" to "neutralize" what the FBI called "black nationalist hate groups" and other dissident groups. The initial targets included Martin Luther King Jr. and others associated with the SCLC.

After the assassination of Martin Luther King Jr. in 1968, leadership was transferred to Ralph Abernathy, who presided until 1977. Abernathy was replaced by Joseph Lowery who was SCLC president until 1997. In 1997, MLK's son, Martin Luther King III, became the president of SCLC. In 2004, for less than a year, it was Fred Shuttlesworth. After him, the president was Charles Steele Jr., and in 2009, Howard W. Creecy Jr. Next were Isaac Newton Farris Jr. and C. T. Vivian, who took office in 2012.

== 1997 to present ==
In 1997, Martin Luther King III was unanimously elected to head the Southern Christian Leadership Conference, replacing Joseph Lowery. Under King's leadership, the SCLC held hearings on police brutality, organized a rally for the 37th anniversary of the "I Have a Dream" speech and launched a successful campaign to change the Georgia state flag, which previously featured a large Confederate cross.

Within only a few months of taking the position, however, King was being criticized by the Conference board for alleged inactivity. He was accused of failing to answer correspondence from the board and take up issues important to the organization. The board also felt he failed to demonstrate against national issues the SCLC previously would have protested, like the disenfranchisement of black voters in the Florida election recount or time limits on welfare recipients implemented by then-President Bill Clinton. King was further criticized for failing to join the battle against AIDS, allegedly because he felt uncomfortable talking about condoms. He also hired Lamell J. McMorris, an executive director who, according to The New York Times, "rubbed board members the wrong way."

The Southern Christian Leadership Conference suspended King from the presidency in June 2001, concerned that he was letting the organization drift into inaction. In a June 25 letter to King, the group's national chairman at the time, Claud Young, wrote, "You have consistently been insubordinate and displayed inappropriate, obstinate behavior in the (negligent) carrying out of your duties as president of SCLC." King was reinstated only one week later after promising to take a more active role. Young said of the suspension, "I felt we had to use a two-by-four to get his attention. Well, it got his attention all right."

After he was reinstated, King prepared a four-year plan outlining a stronger direction for the organization, agreeing to dismiss McMorris and announcing plans to present a strong challenge to the George W. Bush administration in an August convention in Montgomery, Alabama. He also planned to concentrate on racial profiling, prisoners' rights, and closing the digital divide between whites and blacks. However, King also suggested in a statement that the group needed a different approach than it had used in the past, stating, "We must not allow our lust for 'temporal gratification' to blind us from making difficult decisions to effect future generations."

Martin Luther King III resigned in 2004, upon which Fred Shuttlesworth was elected to replace him. Shuttlesworth resigned the same year that he was appointed, complaining that "deceit, mistrust, and a lack of spiritual discipline and truth have eaten at the core of this once-hallowed organization". He was replaced by Charles Steele Jr. who served until October 2009.

On October 30, 2009, Elder Bernice King, King's youngest child, was elected SCLC's new president, with James Bush III taking office in February 2010 as Acting President/CEO until Bernice King took office. However, on January 21, 2011, fifteen months after her election, Bernice King declined the position of president. In a written statement, she said that her decision came "after numerous attempts to connect with the official board leaders on how to move forward under my leadership, unfortunately, our visions did not align."

== Programs ==
It offers leadership and community service programs for youth and adults.

== Leadership ==
The best-known member of the SCLC was Martin Luther King Jr., who was president and chaired the organization until he was assassinated on April 4, 1968. Other prominent members of the organization have included Joseph Lowery, Ralph Abernathy, Ella Baker, James Bevel, Diane Nash, Dorothy Cotton, James Orange, C. O. Simpkins Sr, Charles Kenzie Steele, C. T. Vivian, Fred Shuttlesworth, Bernard Lafayette, Andrew Young, Hosea Williams, Jesse Jackson, Walter E. Fauntroy, Claud Young, Septima Clark, Martin Luther King III, Curtis W. Harris, Maya Angelou, and Golden Frinks.

Presidents

No.	Image	Name	Term
1		Martin Luther King Jr.	1957–1968
2		Ralph Abernathy	1968–1977
3		Joseph Lowery	1977–1997
4		Martin Luther King III	1997–2004
5		Fred Shuttlesworth	2004–2004
6		Charles Steele Jr.	2004–2009
7		Howard W. Creecy Jr.	2009–2011
8		Charles Steele Jr.	2012–2024
9		DeMark Liggins	2024–

== Relationships with other organizations ==
Because of its dedication to direct-action protests, civil disobedience, and mobilizing mass participation in boycotts and marches, SCLC was considered more "radical" than the older NAACP, which favored lawsuits, legislative lobbying, and education campaigns conducted by professionals. At the same time, it was generally considered less radical than Congress of Racial Equality (CORE) or the youth-led Student Nonviolent Coordinating Committee (SNCC).

To a certain extent during the period 1960–1964, SCLC had a mentoring relationship with SNCC before SNCC began moving away from nonviolence and integration in the late 1960s. Over time, SCLC and SNCC took different strategic paths, with SCLC focusing on large-scale campaigns such as Birmingham and Selma to win national legislation, and SNCC focusing on community-organizing to build political power on the local level. In many communities, there was tension between SCLC and SNCC because SCLC's base was the minister-led Black churches, and SNCC was trying to build rival community organizations led by the poor. SCLC also had its own youth volunteer initiative, the SCOPE Project (Summer Community Organization on Political Education), which placed about 500 young people, mostly white students from nearly 100 colleges and universities, who registered about 49,000 voters in 120 counties in 6 southern states in 1965–66.

In August 1979, the head of the SCLC, Joseph Lowery, met with the Palestine Liberation Organization (PLO), endorsing Palestinian self-determination and urging the PLO to "consider" recognizing Israel's right to exist.
