= Firefly Distillery =

- Location: North Charleston, South Carolina
- Founded: 2005
- Founder: Jim Irvin & Scott Newitt
- Website: https://www.fireflydistillery.com/

Firefly Distillery is a company located near Park Circle North Charleston, South Carolina, United States. It produces a line of alcoholic beverages and licenses its brand name to the Sazerac Company for its Sweet Tea Vodka.

== History ==
Firefly Distilling was founded by Jim Irvin and Scott Newitt in Charleston, South Carolina in 2005.

=== Concert series ===
In 2020, Firefly Distilling hosted a Safe Sounds concert series which included Covid protocols, private pods, and organized spacing. These new protocols became how many event venues structured their concerts.

Firefly Distilling announced a concert lineup in 2023 including Gov't Mule, Gregory Alan Isakov with Lucius, Willie Nelson and Family, and Noah Kahan.

== Products ==
Firefly Muscadine Vodka

Firefly Distillery's first product was Firefly Muscadine Vodka. The vodka was introduced in April 2006, after an impromptu early March debut at the Charleston International Antiques Show emceed by Martha Stewart gave the company unexpected attention.

The flavored vodka was inspired by the distillery's location on a vineyard. Muscadine grapes are native to the southeast region, and muscadine wine is traditionally very sweet. This product was originally produced in Florida due to South Carolina's distillery licensing fees issues.

Firefly earned 89 out of 100 points from the Beverage Testing Institute in Chicago, outscoring such industry standards as Absolut and Ketel One.

Firefly Sweet Tea Vodka

In April 2008 Firefly Sweet Tea Vodka was added to the product line. The product is a twist on the southern staple, sweet tea. The vodka is distilled on Wadmalaw Island and the tea is from Charleston Tea Plantation.

In 2013, the Distillery introduced Firefly Moonshine. Moonshine flavors include White Lightning, Apple Pie, Blackberry, Caramel, Cherry, Peach, Ruby Red and Strawberry.

Firefly Handcrafted Vodka

Firefly Handcrafted Vodka, a straight vodka product, was introduced to the market in January 2009. This vodka is distilled slowly in batches six times. Currently this product is only distributed to South Carolina, but plans are to expand distribution. The 2009 San Francisco World Spirits Competition awarded Firefly Handcrafted Vodka a bronze medal.

Firefly Sweet Tea Whiskey

Firefly Sweet Tea Whiskey is made with tea grown locally near the distillery. It is only available in South Carolina.

Firefly Bourbon Ball Whiskey

Firefly Bourbon Ball Whiskey is a chocolate and pecan flavored whiskey.

Firefly Southern Lemonade

Firefly Southern Lemonade was released in April 2010 and is a part of Firefly's ready to drink collection. Firefly Southern Lemonade blends Firefly straight vodka with fresh squeezed lemonade.

Firefly Sweet Tea Lemonade

The Sweet Tea Lemonade is a blend of Firefly Sweet Tea Vodka and fresh squeezed lemonade.

== Sweet Tea Vodka Production by the Sazerac Company ==
In October 2008, Firefly Distillery and the Sazerac Company formed a joint venture to produce Firefly Sweet Tea Vodka at Sazerac's Buffalo Trace Distillery in Kentucky and distribute the product through Sazerac's distribution channels. Through this joint venture Firefly Sweet Tea Vodka was able to be distributed to all states by March 2009.

The Sazerac Company web site lists this Firefly brand product in its brand portfolio.
