= Dorothy Cotton =

American civil rights activist (1930–2018)

- Born: Dorothy Lee Forman; June 9, 1930; Goldsboro, North Carolina, U.S.
- Died: June 10, 2018 (aged 88); Ithaca, New York, U.S.
- Education: Shaw University; Virginia State University; Boston University
- Known for: Civil Rights Movement
- Spouse: George Cotton

Dorothy Cotton (June 9, 1930 – June 10, 2018) was an American civil rights activist, who was a leader in the Civil Rights Movement in the United States and a member of the inner circle of one of its main organizations, the Southern Christian Leadership Conference (SCLC). As the SCLC's Educational Director, she was arguably the highest-ranked female member of the organization.

== Early life and education ==
Cotton was born in Goldsboro, North Carolina, on June 9, 1930, as Dorothy Lee Foreman. Her mother, Maggie Pelham Foreman, died when she was 3 years old. That left her and her three sisters to be raised by their father, Claude Foreman, a tobacco factory and steel mill worker with only a third-grade education. Life was a daily struggle in their southern segregated rural town. Cotton's father would frequently beat Cotton and her three sisters. Cotton said, "I recall nothing nurturing in my home environment".

When Cotton was in high school, she met Rosa Gray, an English teacher who positively changed her life and encouraged her to be successful and strong. Gray, the director of the annual school play, often cast her in the lead, which Foreman said made her feel "such a connection to her". Gray helped secure a place for Cotton at Shaw University, where she studied English, as well as securing two part-time jobs for her on campus, one in the school cafeteria and the other cleaning the teacher's dormitory. When Dr. Daniel, a teacher at Shaw, was offered the presidency at Virginia State University, Cotton went along and worked as his housekeeper. Cotton described her job at the residence as "part daughter, part housekeeper" While at Virginia State, she met a man by the name of Horace Sims, a student in a Shakespearean class with her, who introduced her to George Cotton. George Cotton was not a student at Virginia State. Dorothy married George in President Daniel's home just after graduating. She then pursued and earned a master's degree in Speech Therapy from Boston University in 1960. It was in Petersburg that Cotton got involved in a local church led by Wyatt T. Walker. It was here that her Civil Rights activism would begin.

== Civil rights activism ==
In an interview done by the Library of Congress, Cotton recounts an instance when she was outside and a white boy rode his bike by and sang, "deep down in the heart of niggertown." She recounts the experience and says that this made her angry, and she never forgot it, having given her "a consciousness about the wrongness of the system" This would set up her mentality as she began her journey working with the Civil Rights Movement.

Whilst she was attending Virginia State University, she got involved with a local church led by Wyatt T. Walker, the regional head for the National Association for the Advancement of Colored People. She says that she felt drawn to the church because of its involvement in the movement. Walker asked Cotton if she would be willing to help organize and train children for picketing campaigns. Her job was to teach them how to correctly picket and march for the movement. "She helped Walker protest segregation at the library and at the lunch counter, and she taught direct-action tactics to students." Not long after she got involved, Martin Luther King Jr. was invited to the church to speak. The program for the evening included both King and Cotton. Cotton read a piece of poetry, and King took an interest and later had a conversation with Cotton. While in Petersburg, King asked Walker if he would move to Atlanta to help King form the Southern Christian Leadership Conference. Walker said that he would only go if he could bring two of his closest associates. Those two associates were Jim Wood and Dorothy Cotton. Cotton made the decision to go but to stay for only three months. She ended up staying for 23 years. In those years, she made immense contributions to the Civil Rights Movement. When Cotton first arrived in Atlanta, she was Walker's Administrative Assistant. Not long after, King recruited her to help out at Highlander Folk School, a school that was receiving much bad publicity. At Highlander, Cotton met Septima Clark, with whom she would work on the Citizenship Education Program.

According to the acclaimed 2023 biography King: A Life by Jonathan Eig, Dorothy Cotton and Martin Luther King Jr. "would become more than friends, more than colleagues. And, though she would never publicly reveal her secret, Cotton would tell friends that she and King were as close and devoted as husband and wife. 'He loved his wife,' Cotton said in one interview, 'but he also, he loved some other folks, too.' Others in King's inner circle knew of the relationship but kept it secret. Cotton, Juanita Abernathy said years later, 'did everything but call herself Martin's woman.'"

Cotton's involvement with the movement dominated her life. That was so due to her feeling of obligation. In her autobiography, Cotton wrote, "our work with SCLC was not just a job, it was a life commitment." Perhaps her biggest achievement in the movement was the Citizenship Education Program: a program meant to help blacks register to vote.

=== Citizenship Education Program ===
I realize that people, en masse, saw the civil rights movement just as a bunch of marches. And I know from first hand that that's not true. We had a major training program called Citizenship Education Program. The reason for doing this citizenship training was to help African-American folk, who were living at a time when we had what I call American style apartheid.

— Dorothy Cotton, interview with PBS (2013)

Cotton's close work with Septima Clark and Esau Jenkins, via both the Highlander Folk School in Tennessee and the Southern Christian Leadership Conference, created a grassroots movement in rural southern areas during the violent and tense Civil Rights Era of the 1960s. Esau Jenkins was an early participant in the formation of the Program. As an independent businessman with "a third grade education but a PhD mind", Jenkins drove a private bus to the mainland from the coastal Islands of South Carolina, taking island locals to and from their day jobs.

During these rides, Esau would start conversations with his passengers about the power and importance of their individual right to vote. Esau recognized a dire need for educational programs aimed at bringing awareness to political and civil rights in an effort to spark African-American communities into action for change. These informal conversations were imperative to forming the base of initial participants in the Citizenship Education Program.

The Citizenship Education Program focused predominantly on teaching voter registration requirements as well as community and individual empowerment. Most Southern states had created voting registration laws designed around literacy exercises specifically to disqualify potential African-American voters. Requirements to register to vote included having the ability to recite random parts of the Constitution as well as signing one's name in cursive writing. Many of those imposing these prerequisites on blacks were themselves illiterate, rendering the process unreliable and subjective; many blacks were turned away. The program sought to reinforce in them an awareness that their voting rights were inviolable. The program also taught about dealing with basic everyday needs. Another hope for the program was to create a wave of education that would spread throughout the local communities, with the community members themselves as the teachers.

The hope for the education program was that it would spread to other communities and that these programs and schools would be set up in other communities throughout the south and, ultimately, the entire United States. In a brochure for the program the goal is clearly stated: "Their immediate program is teaching reading and writing. They help students pass literacy tests for voting." These programs also covered the cost of tuition, training, and even the cost of travelling to the training center itself. With its commitment the Citizenship Education Program would help many blacks register over the next few years. The Citizenship Education Program had a profound impact on the movement with well over 6,000 men and women participating in workshops and classes.

Cotton helped James Bevel organize the students during the Birmingham campaign and its Children's Crusade, and conducted citizenship classes throughout the South during the era. She also accompanied Martin Luther King Jr., the co-founder and first president of the SCLC, on his trip to Oslo, Norway to receive the 1964 Nobel Peace Prize.

An in-depth interview with Cotton was done by the Oral Histories of the Civil Rights History Project, conducted through the University of North Carolina.

== Later career ==
Cotton relocated to Ithaca, New York in 1982 to serve as Director of Student Activities at Cornell University, a position she held for nearly a decade. While living in Ithaca, she developed a close relationship with her community and her work as an activist and educator continued; in 2008, the Dorothy Cotton Institute was founded. The organization's mission is to: "develop, nurture and train leaders for a global human rights movement; build a network and community of civil and human rights leadership; and explore, share and promote practices that transform individuals and communities, opening new pathways to peace, justice and healing."

== Legacy and impact ==
The Ithaca, New York-based musical group the Dorothy Cotton Jubilee Singers sings in Cotton's honor. She was a gifted singer and often led spirituals at rallies and in classes. The group seeks to "preserve the uniquely American art form of the formal concert style 'Negro Spiritual.'"

== Death ==
Dorothy Cotton died on June 10, 2018, a day after her 88th birthday.

== See also ==
- List of civil rights leaders
