= The Progressive Club =

- U.S. National Register of Historic Places
- Location within South Carolina Location within the United States
- Location: 3377 River Rd., Johns Island, South Carolina
- Coordinates: 32°40′35″N 80°2′32″W
- Area: less than one acre
- Built by: Jones, Esakia
- NRHP reference No.: 07001109
- Added to NRHP: October 24, 2007

The Progressive Club is a historic clubhouse located at Johns Island, Charleston County, South Carolina. The Club itself was formed in 1948. The club house was built in 1963, and provided a home for Esau Jenkins' Progressive Club's legal and financial assistance program, adult education program, and dormitory lodging. It also served as a community recreational, child care, meeting place and grocery store. The building was built to house a "Citizenship School" where adult education classes and workshops enabled African-American citizens to register, vote, and become aware of the political processes of their communities. It was listed on the National Register of Historic Places in 2007.

== Gallery of images ==
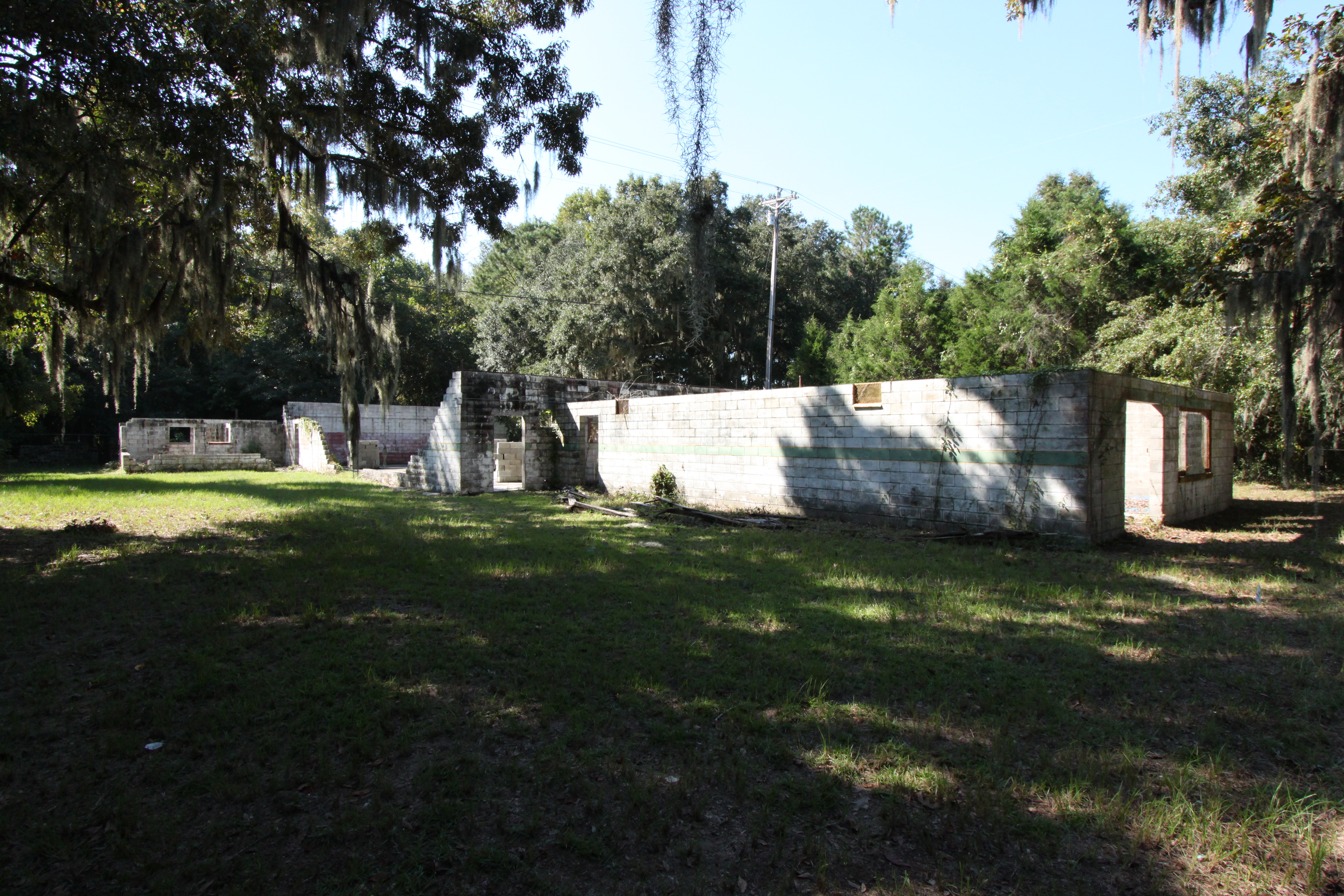
What remains of the club today

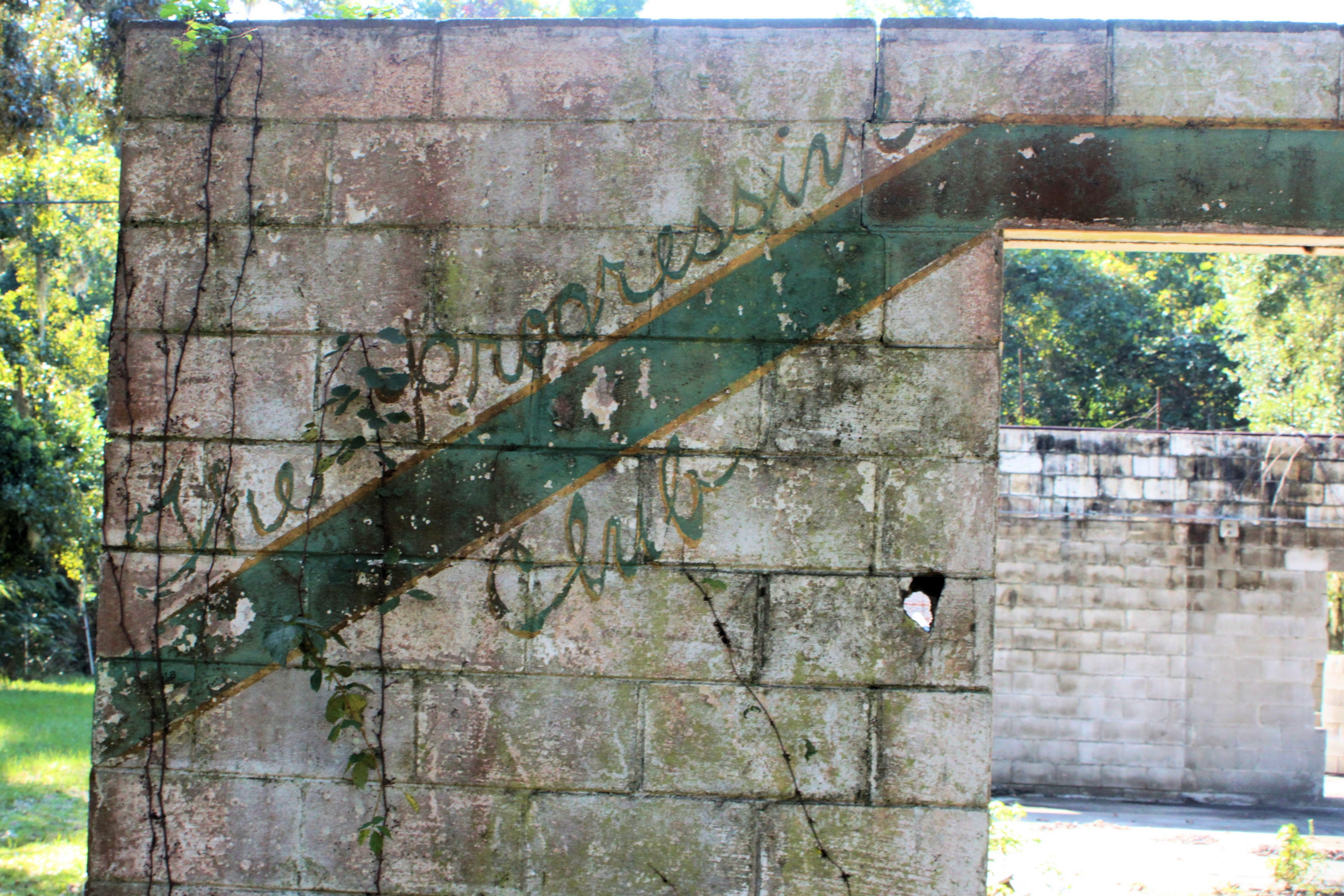
A view of the front of the club

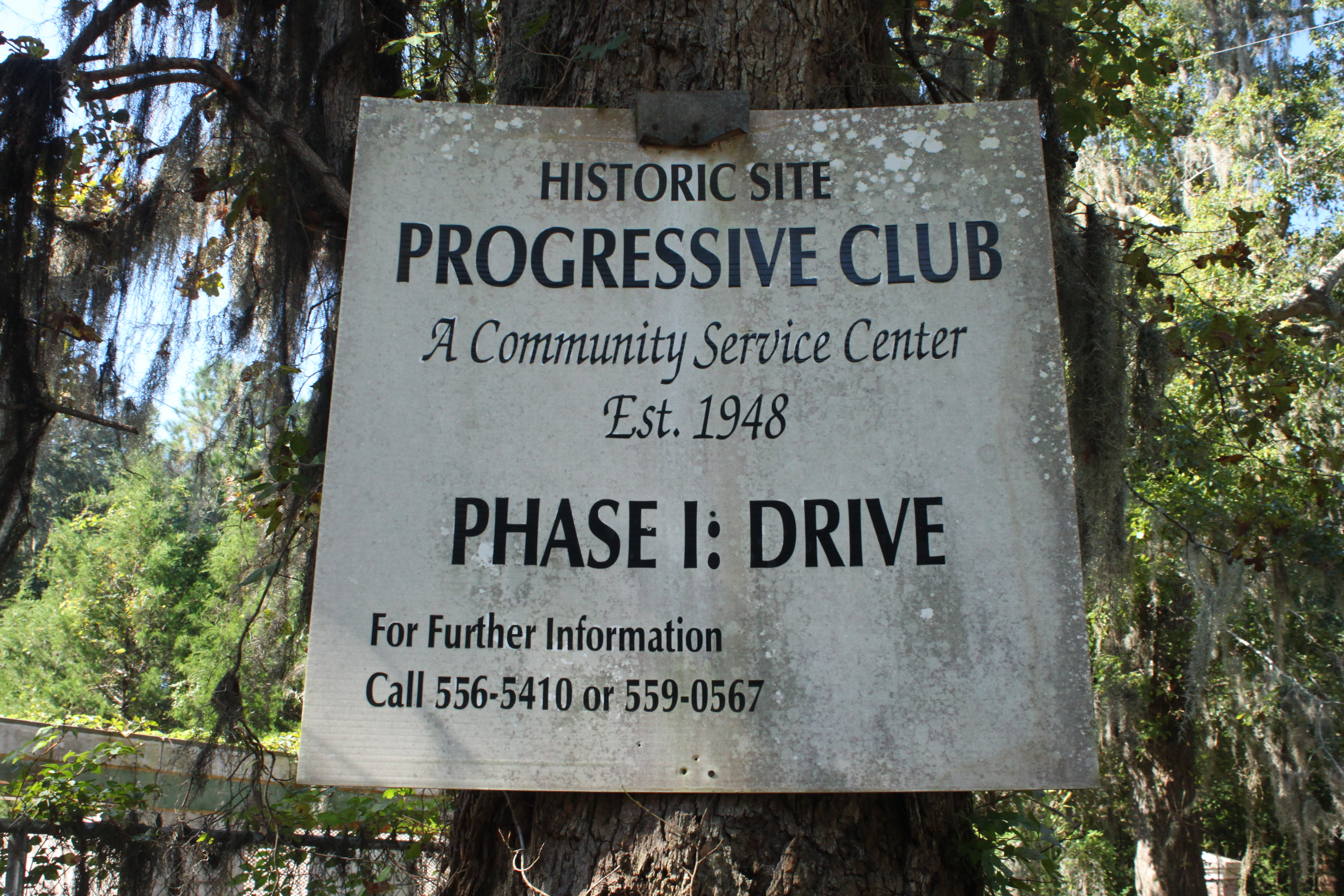
A sign about restoration of the club

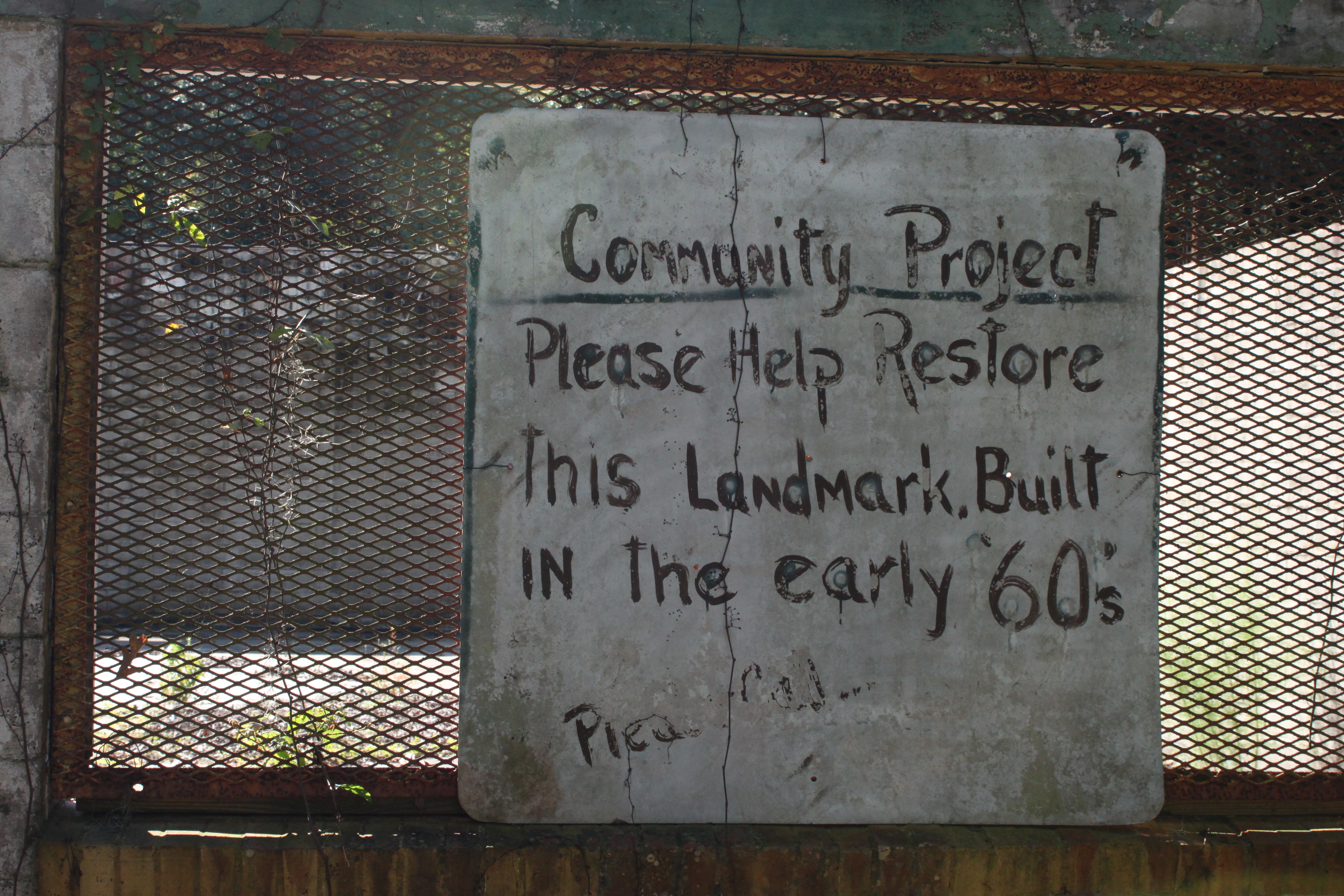
An appeal to save the club

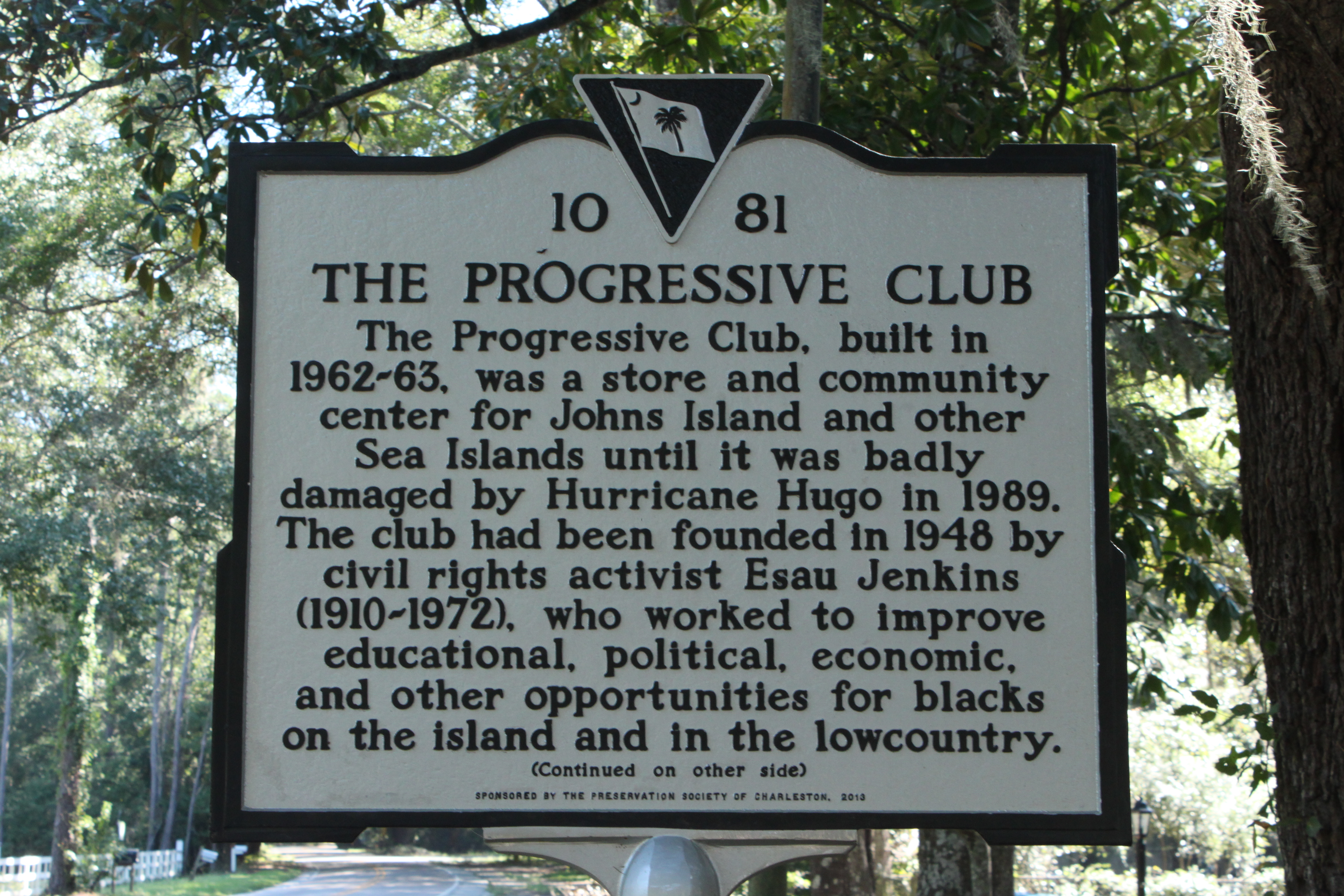
Front of Historical Marker

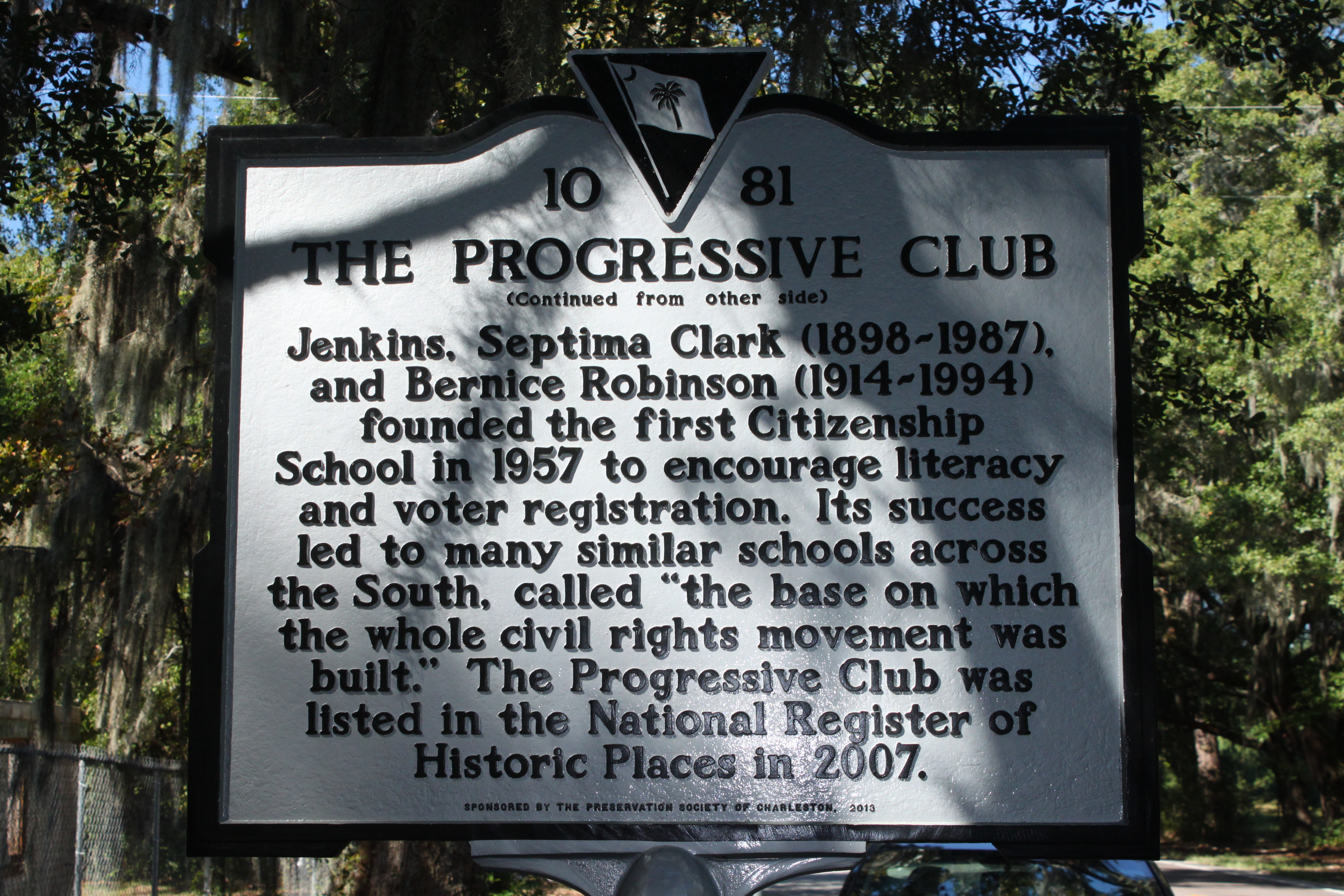
Back of Historical Marker
