= Angel Oak =

Southern live oak

- Angel Oak, Johns Island, South Carolina
- Interactive map of Angel Oak
- Species: Southern live oak (Quercus virginiana)
- Location: Johns Island, South Carolina, US
- Coordinates: 32°43′02″N 80°04′50″W
- Website: angeloaktree.com

Angel Oak is an exceptionally large southern live oak (Quercus virginiana) located in Angel Oak Park on Johns Island near Charleston, South Carolina. The tree is estimated to be 400–500 years old. It stands 66.5 ft (20 m) tall, measures 28 ft (8.5 m) in circumference, and produces shade that covers 17,200 square feet (1600 m^{2}). Its longest branch distance is 187 ft (57 m) in length. Angel Oak was the 210th tree registered with the Live Oak Society. The tree was listed on the National Register of Historic Places in 2026.

== Background ==
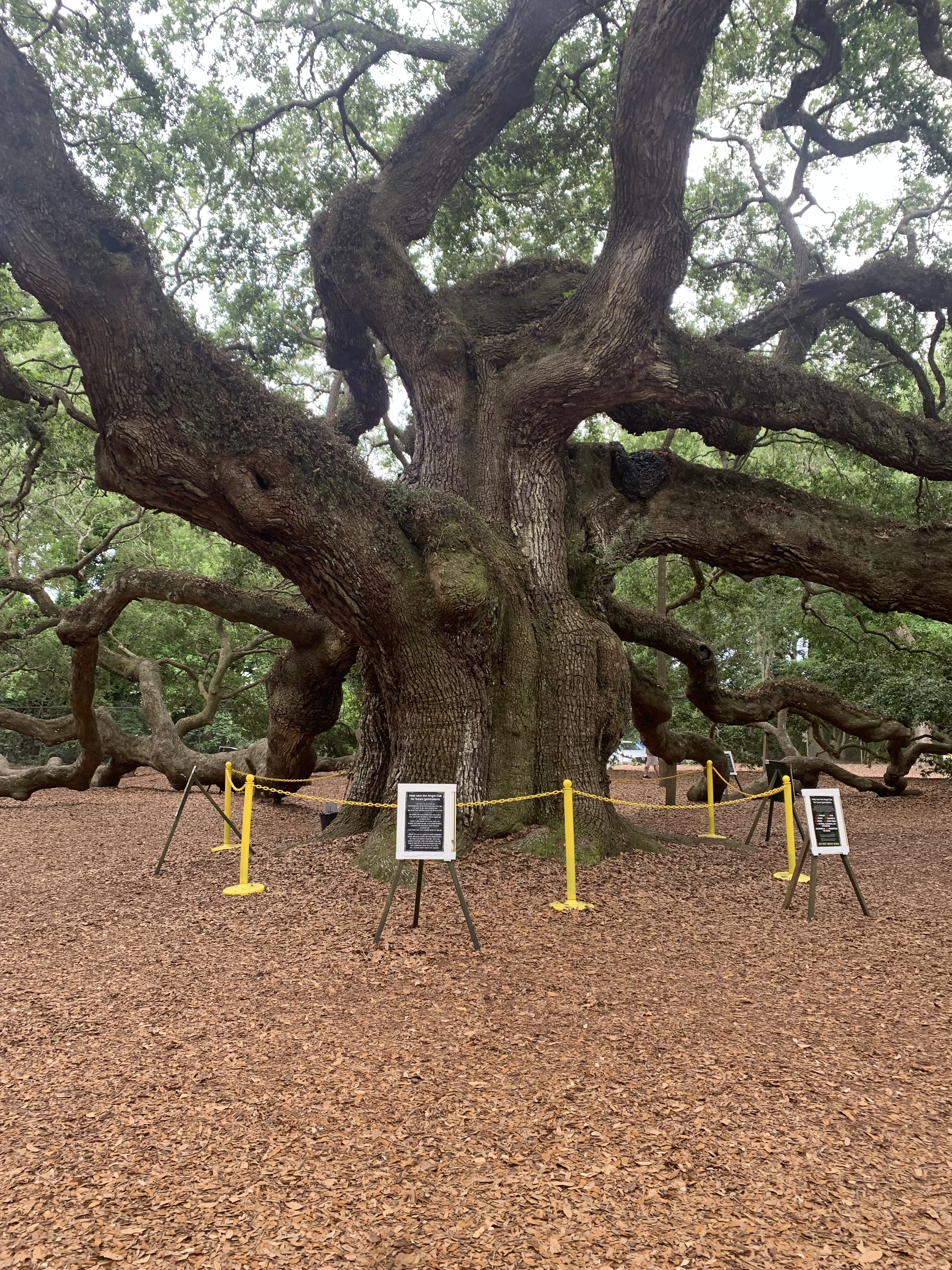
The Angel Oak, as seen in 2022.

The oak derives its name from the estate of Justus Angel and his wife, Martha Waight Tucker Angel. Local folklore tells stories of ghosts of former slaves appearing as angels around the tree.

Despite the claims that the Angel Oak is the oldest tree east of the Mississippi River, bald cypress trees throughout North and South Carolina are significantly older. One example in North Carolina is over 1,600 years old.

== History ==
Angel Oak was damaged severely during Hurricane Hugo in 1989 but has since recovered. The City of Charleston has owned the tree and surrounding park since 1991.

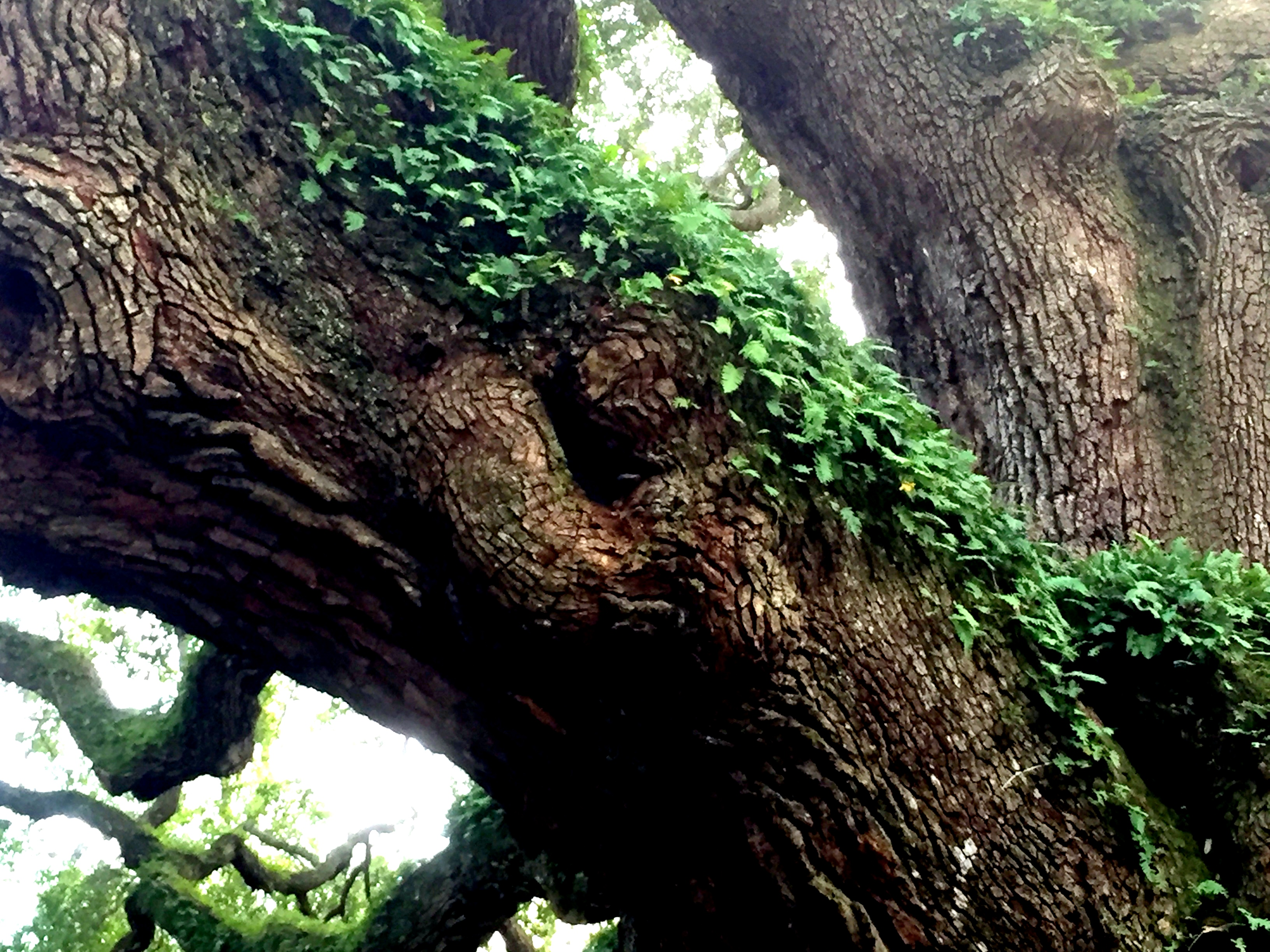
Ferns and other greenery grow along the tree's massive limbs.

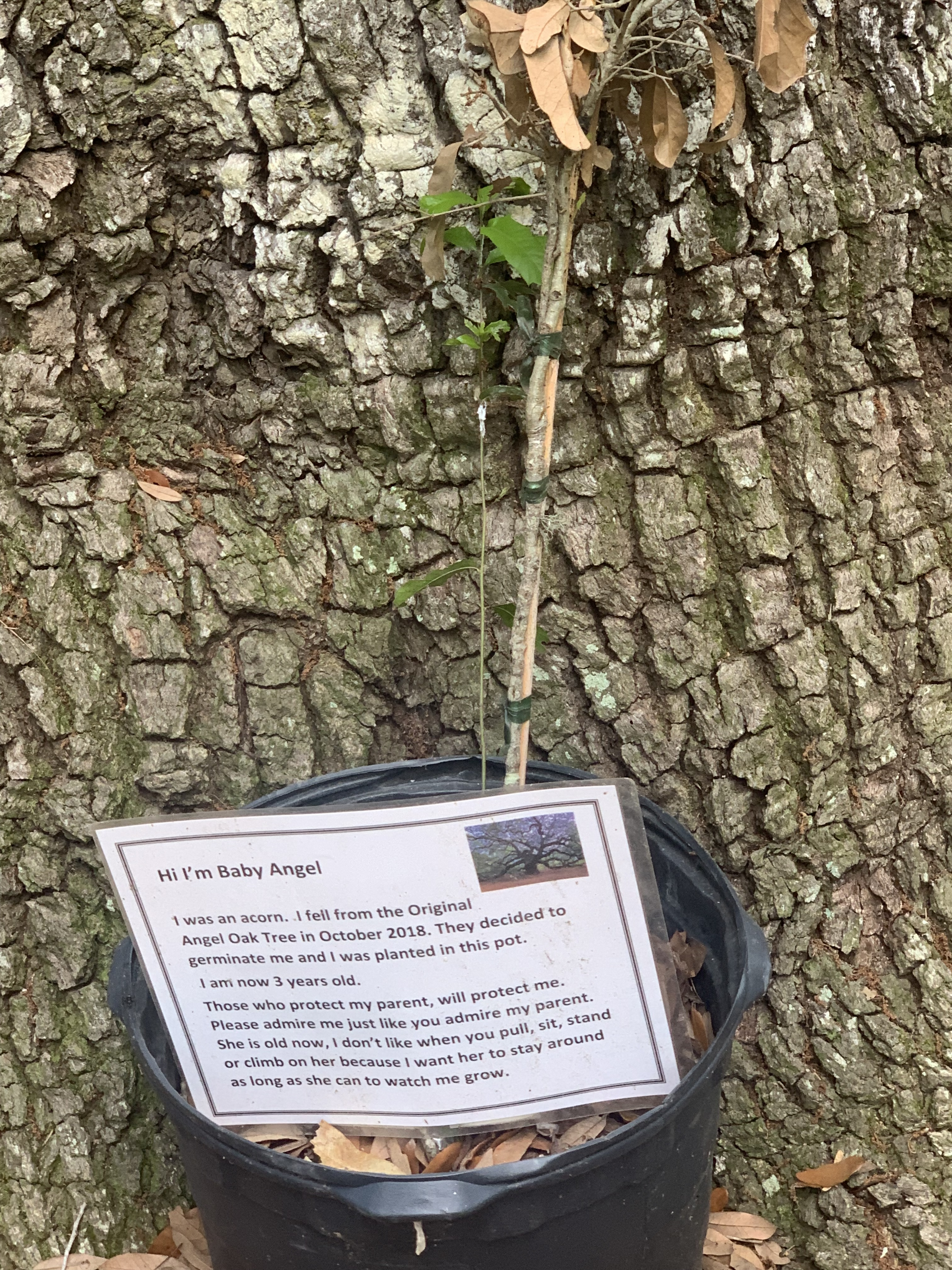
The Baby Angel tree.

Development is beginning to encroach on the site of Angel Oak. In 2012, plans to build a 500-unit apartment complex that would be 160 yards (150 m) from Angel Oak were challenged in court by a group called Save the Angel Oak and the Coastal Conservation League; their concerns included the construction's effect on available groundwater and nutrients. By December 2013, the Lowcountry Land Trust, celebrated "the preservation of 17 acres adjacent to the majestic tree." The 17 acres adjacent to the Angel Oak were purchased by Lowcountry Land Trust, protecting the area from development.

The Angel Oak tree is featured prominently in the romance novel Where the Fireflies Dream by Emily Nelson.

Angel Oak was the focal point of an Allstate television ad in September 2018 saluting the strength of the Carolinas following the devastation of Hurricane Florence.

In October of 2018, an acorn fell from the tree. The acorn was germinated and placed in a pot under the main tree's large branches. It was given the name "Baby Angel".

== See also ==
- List of individual trees
