= Moving Star Hall =

- U.S. National Register of Historic Places
- Location within South Carolina Location within the United States
- Location: 3104 River Rd., Johns Island, South Carolina
- Coordinates: 32°41′1.5″N 80°1′27.5″W
- Area: less than one acre
- Built: c. 1917
- NRHP reference No.: 82003843
- Added to NRHP: June 17, 1982

Moving Star Hall is a historic community building located on Johns Island, Charleston County, South Carolina. It was built about 1917, and is a crudely built, one-story, rectangular, frame, weatherboarded building. It has a low concrete block pillar foundation and a metal-covered gable roof. Also on the property is a contributing outhouse. The building was used by the local African-American population as a "praise house" and meeting place of the Moving Star Young Association, a religious, social, fraternal, and charitable community institution.

It was listed on the National Register of Historic Places in 1982.
