= Bigelow Tea Company =

American tea manufacturer

R.C. Bigelow, Inc.
- Type: Private
- Industry: Beverages
- Founded: 1945; 81 years ago
- Founder: Ruth Campbell Bigelow
- Headquarters: Fairfield, Connecticut, U.S.
- Key people: Cindi Bigelow, president and CEO
- Products: Teas and herbal teas
- Revenue: US$188.9 million
- Number of employees: 350
- Website: www.bigelowtea.com

Bigelow's Constant Comment tea

R.C. Bigelow, Inc., also known as the Bigelow Tea Company, is an American tea manufacturer based in Fairfield, Connecticut. It was founded by Ruth C. Bigelow in 1945, based on a recipe she marketed as "Constant Comment" tea. The company sells more than 50 varieties of tea, including black, green, and herbal, all of which are blended in Fairfield. It also operates plants in Boise, Idaho, and Louisville, Kentucky. The company owns the Charleston Tea Garden in South Carolina, but the garden does not produce the tea for Bigelow's products. Bigelow is family-owned, employs 350 people, and reported annual sales of approximately US$188.9 million in 2020.

== Constant Comment ==
Constant Comment is one of Bigelow's most popular products. It is a black tea flavored with orange rind and sweet spices. Ruth Bigelow, an interior designer, developed the recipe in 1945 by adapting an old colonial recipe for orange-and-spice flavored tea to be made in stone containers.

In 1945, The New York Times food writer Jane Holt wrote about the newly introduced tea:

Ruth Campbell Bigelow and Bertha West Nealey [are] both interior decorators whose enthusiasm for tea has led them to blend their own... an unusual and delicious brew called Constant Comment, which has just been introduced in city stores.... Unlike the ordinary sorts, it is so concentrated that a little goes a long way. For example, in preparing it, a scant half-teaspoon is recommended for three cups.... Several other varieties are in the process of experimentation in the laboratory.... The price ranges from 67 to 75 cents a [two-and-one-quarter-ounce] jar.

A 1945 article by noted food writer Clementine Paddleford tells this story about the origin of the name:

The tea was ready for market, but no name seemed to suit. Then it happened this way: One of Mrs. Bigelow's Park Avenue friends was giving an afternoon party, and it was suggested she try the new blend. Not a word was said to the guests regarding its novelty, yet everyone spoke of the tea's aroma, its flavor—there was “constant comment.” A good name, why not? Labels were made and the tea was hurried to the stores, where it is selling at around 75 cents for the two-and-one-quarter ounce jar. Expensive? But here's a tea so flavorful that three quarters of a teaspoon make six bracing cups of aromatic spiciness.

Sales grew slowly but steadily and rose in the 1970s, when the company began packing its tea bags in folding cardboard boxes instead of tins. According to singer-songwriter Leonard Cohen, the famous lines, "and she feeds you tea and oranges / that come all the way from China", from his song "Suzanne", refer to Constant Comment tea. The tea also gets a mention in the 1977 children's novella 'Mildred Murphy, how does your Garden Grow?' by Phyllis Green in which "[Mildred's] loneliness disappears when [she] befriends a secretive woman living in a condemned garage" who is fond of the tea.

In 2016, CEO Cindi Bigelow said of the recipe for Constant Comment: "the only two people who know the formula are my parents [Ruth Bigelow's son David, Jr. and his wife]" and that the recipe remains unchanged from the original since it was first developed.

== See also ==
- Earl Grey tea, an English tea blend flavored with oil from the bergamot orange, but no spices
- List of tea companies
