= Esau Jenkins =

American activist

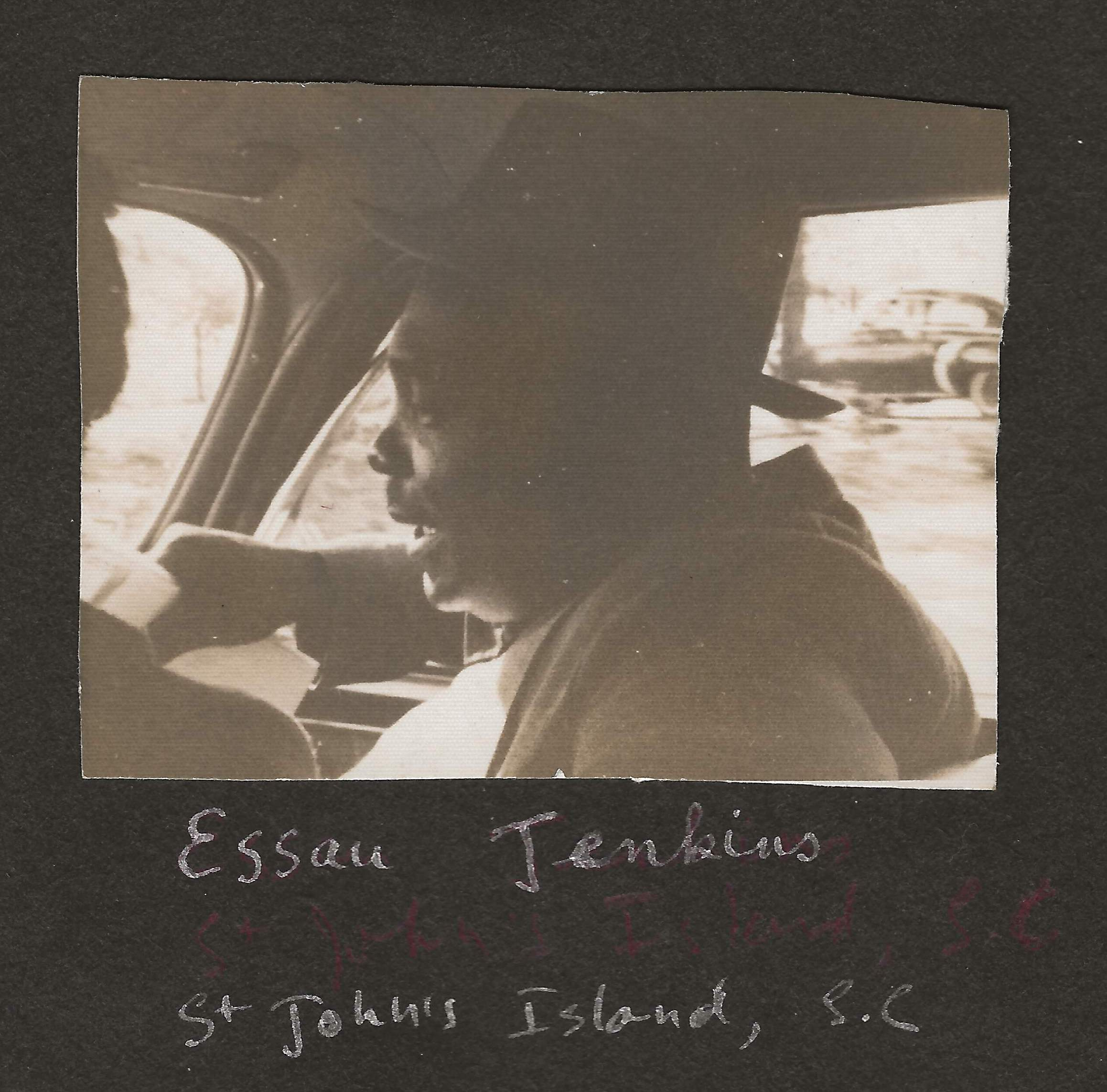
- Born: July 3, 1910
- Died: October 30, 1972 (aged 62)
- Burial place: Wesley United Methodist Church Cemetery, Johns Island, South Carolina
- Spouse: Janie B. Jenkins

Esau Jenkins (July 3, 1910 – October 30, 1972) was an American human Rights leader, businessman, local preacher, and community organizer. He was the founder and leader of many organizations and institutions which helped improved the political, educational, housing, health and economic conditions of Sea Island residents.

== Life and career ==
Jenkins grew up during the times of segregation, when educational opportunities were not readily available to him. However, he knew the importance of education and was determined that his children and those of others would not be denied. In the 1940s, Esau and his wife Janie used their money from farming and selling produce to purchase several buses. These buses were used to transport their own children and others on the Sea Islands to school in Charleston and thus further their education. In 1951, he was instrumental in the establishment of Haut Gap High School on Johns Island, so all children on the island would have the educational opportunity to better themselves. Today, Haut Gap is an advance studies magnet middle school.

Jenkins’ buses also transported workers to jobs in the Charleston area. During the bus rides, Jenkins and his wife would teach their adult passengers the information needed to pass the literacy exam, so they could become registered voters. Jenkins realized the need for a systemic approach to adult education. At the invitation of Septima Clark, he traveled to Highlander Folk Center to meet with Myles Horton to discuss the need for adult education and citizen classes on the Sea Islands. The first citizenship school was established on Johns Island at the Progressive Club (listed in 2007 on the National Register of Historic Places ). The Progressive Club was a co-op started in 1948 by Jenkins and other families on Johns Island. Notable individuals participated in workshops including Dr. Martin Luther King Jr. and many others. The co-op housed a community grocery store, gas station, recreation area, sleeping rooms, classroom space and allowed residents to trade goods and services to help each other in times of need. The school was so effective that it served as the model for other citizenship schools established throughout the South to teach adult education, basic literacy and political education classes and workshops, resulting in thousands of citizens becoming registered voters.

Jenkins founded the Citizens Committee of Charleston in 1959 and the C.O. Federal Credit Union in 1966. This credit union helped to further the economic advancement of the community. Residents were able to secure low-interest loans to purchase homes, businesses, vehicles and even send their children to college.

Jenkins was also one of the founders of Rural Mission, Inc. This initiative provided services for migrant and seasonal farm workers on the Sea Islands. In or about 1970, Rural Mission, Inc. received $96,000.00 through the Office of Economic Opportunity with the assistance of Senator Ernest F. Hollings to start a health clinic at Bethlehem United Methodist Church to serve the five sea islands of Charleston County: Johns Island, James Island, Wadmalaw Island, Edisto Island, and Yonges Island. In February 1972, the health clinic became a separate incorporated entity and was known as Sea Island Comprehensive Health Care Corporation, a comprehensive health care center for the Sea Island residents.

Jenkins and his wife owned and operated a fruit and vegetable stand, a fleet of buses, a motel and restaurant in Charleston, SC and also on Atlantic Beach, SC.

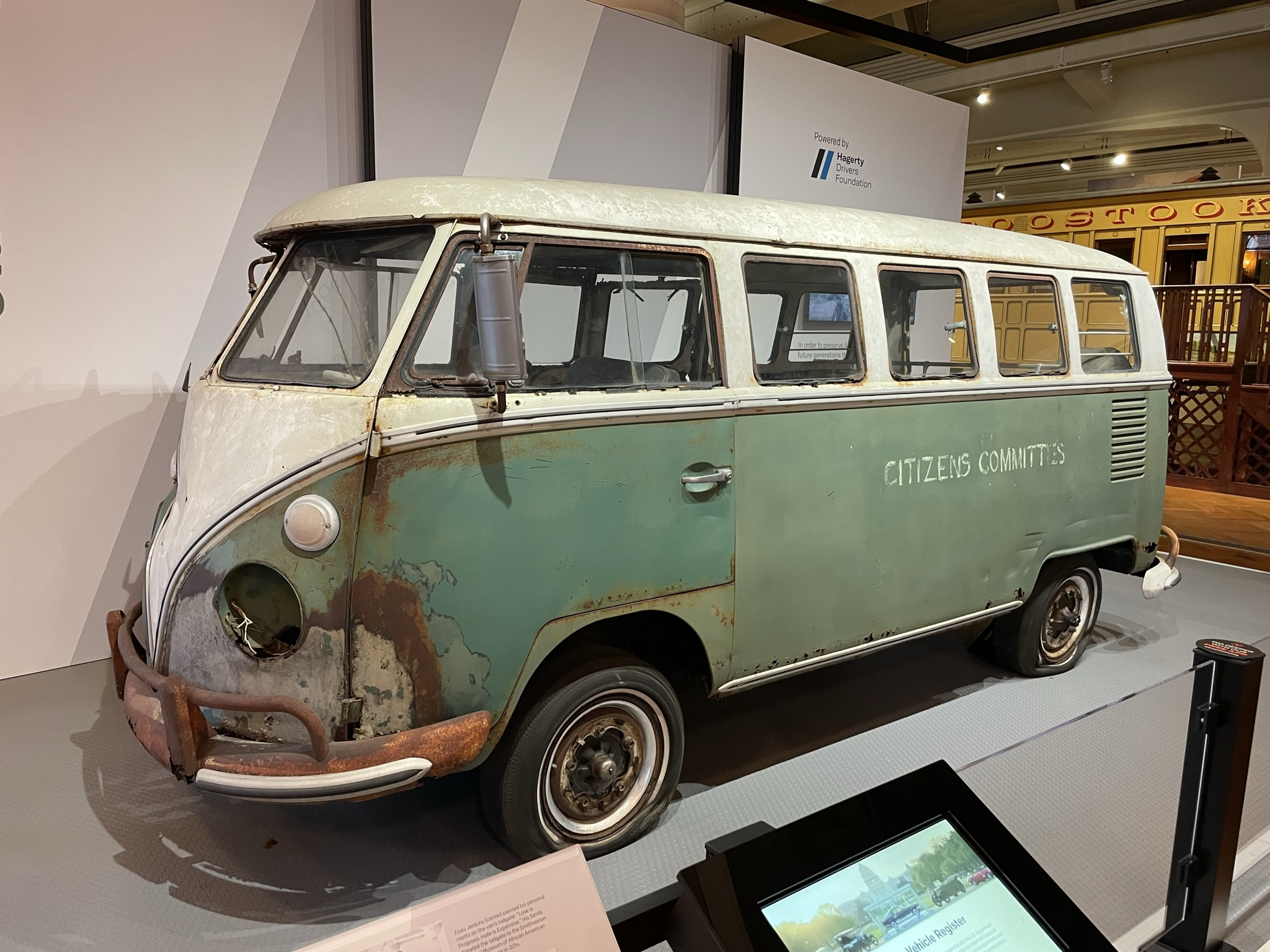
Esau Jenkins VW bus

Mr. Jenkins was known for his iconic 1966 Volkswagen deluxe station wagon (also known as a VW Bus) that he used for his work in the community and throughout the South. Printed on the back panels of the vehicle was Jenkins' motto: “Love is Progress, Hate is Expensive.” In 2014, the Jenkins family donated the back panels of the vehicle to the new Smithsonian National Museum of African American History and Culture to become a part of one of the permanent exhibits entitled “Defining Freedom, Defending Freedom: The Era of Segregation”.

The Smithsonian, the Jenkins family, and the Preservation Society of Charleston hosted the bus artifacts send off to the Smithsonian on June 1, 2014. This event was included in the Piccolo Spoleto Festival and several hundred attended. All local Charleston news outlets covered the story via interviews and articles about the event.

The Historic Vehicle Association and the College of Charleston's Historic Preservation and Community Planning BA Program were instrumental in preserving the Volkswagen bus, and in September 2019, the bus was the 26th vehicle added to the National Historic Vehicle Register.

Jenkins died on October 30, 1972. He has received many posthumous awards, including having a bridge, street, and health clinic named in his memory.

== Notes ==
- Carawan, Guy; Carawan, Candie (1994). Ain't You Got a Right to the Tree of Life?: The People of Johns Island South Carolina―Their Faces, Their Words, and Their Songs. University of Georgia Press. ISBN 978-0820316437.
- Suttles, Sherry (2009). "Esau Jenkins Motel and Restaurant on Atlantic Beach". Atlantic Beach. Images of America. p. 37. ISBN 9780738568201.
- Estes, Steve (2015). Charleston in Black and White: Race and Power in the South after the Civil Rights Movement. University of North Carolina Press. ISBN 978-1469622323.
