= St. John's High School (South Carolina) =

High school in South Carolina, United States

Coordinates: 32.7246°N 80.0989°W

Location
- 1518 Main Road; Johns Island, (Charleston County), South Carolina 29455; United States

Information
- Type: Public high school
- Principal: Jermaine Joyner
- Teaching staff: 30.00 (FTE)
- Enrollment: 423 (2023-2024)
- Student to teacher ratio: 14.10
- Colors: Cardinal red and royal blue
- Nickname: Islanders
- Website: https://stjohns.ccsdschools.com/

St. John's High School (SJHS) is a senior high school in Charleston, South Carolina, on Johns Island. It is a part of the Charleston County School District. St. John's is home to approximately 300 students and 30 faculty and staff.

Its boundary also includes Kiawah Island and Seabrook Island.

St. John's offers Advanced Placement and dual credit courses totaling over 30 hours of offered college credit, as well as three career academies in Hospitality and Tourism, Computer Science, and Culinary Arts.

As of the 2022–23 school year, the school had an enrollment of 387 students and 31.0 classroom teachers (on an FTE basis), for a student–teacher ratio of 12.5:1. All 387 students (100.0% of enrollment) were eligible for free lunch.

== Athletics ==
The school's athletic teams are known as the Mighty Islanders, and royal blue and maroon are the school colors. St. John's competes at the A level in football, volleyball, basketball (boys' and girls'), wrestling, soccer, track, baseball, and softball. The Islanders also offer marching band, agriculture and green house, weightlifting, competitive academic team, and student council.
