= Wadmalaw Island =

Island in South Carolina, United States of America

Coordinates: 32°40′25″N 80°10′42″W

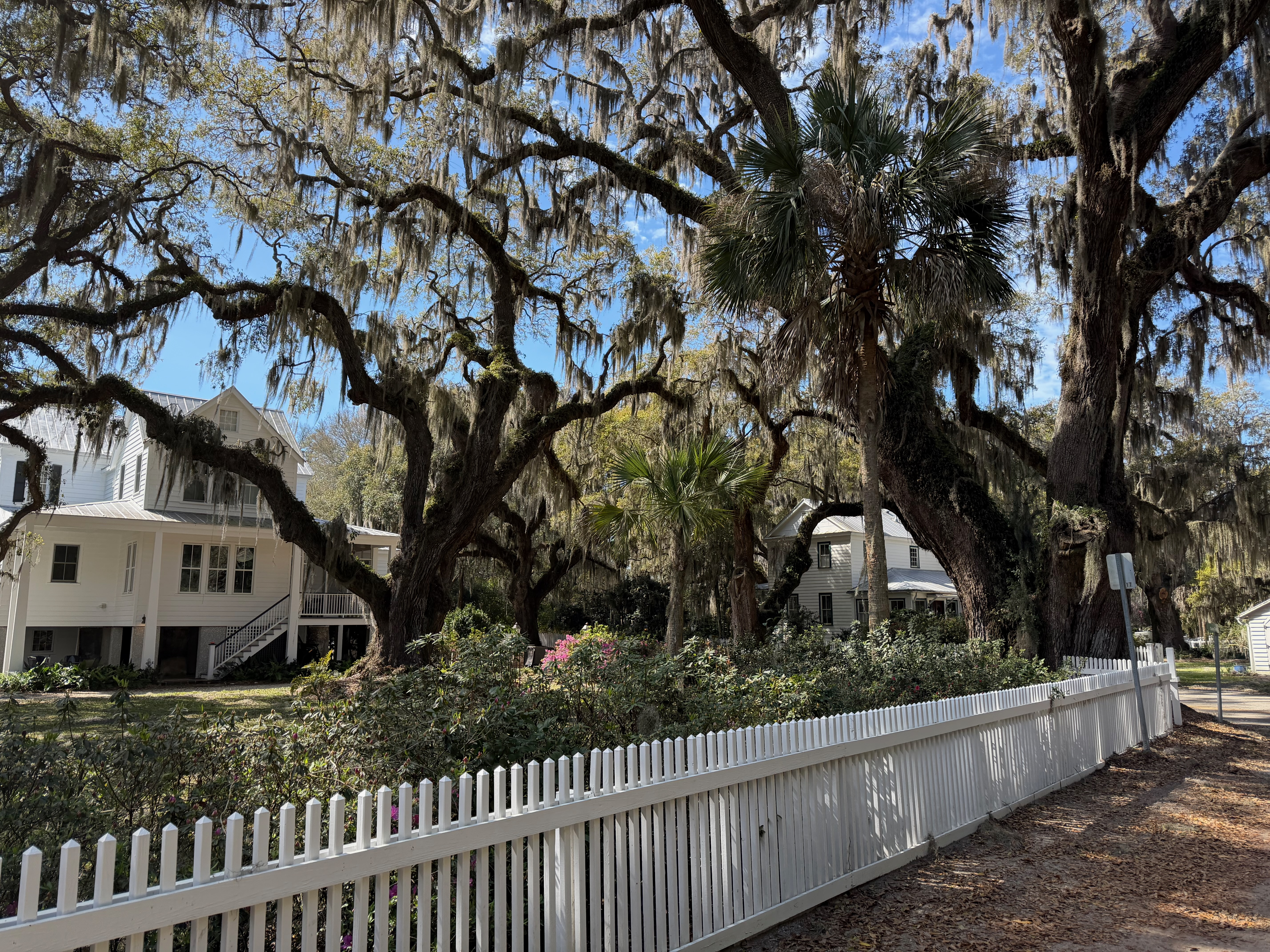
- Rockville, a town on Wadmalaw Island
- Interactive map of Wadmalaw Island

Geography
- Location: Atlantic Ocean
- Area: 41.893 sq mi (108.50 km^{2})

Wadmalaw Island is an island located in Charleston County, South Carolina, United States. It is one of the Sea Islands, a chain of tidal and barrier islands on the Atlantic Ocean.

== Geography ==
Wadmalaw Island is located generally to the southwest of Johns Island and more than halfway encircled by it. To the north it is bordered by Church Creek; to the northeast and east by Bohicket Creek; to the south by the North Edisto River; and to the west and northwest by Wadmalaw River. The island's only connection to the mainland is via a bridge over Church Creek. The island is about 10 miles (16 km) long by 6 miles (10 km) wide. It has a land area of 108.502 km^{2} (41.893 sq mi). The 2000 United States census reported a population of 2,611.

== History ==
Captain Robert Sandford and the crew of the Berkeley Bay landed on Wadmalaw Island in mid-June 1666 after an excursion up the Bohicket Creek. It is believed that Sandford landed where Rockville, South Carolina, is now. On June 23, 1666, captain and crew carried out the ritual of turf and twig, claiming the land for England and the Lords Proprietors.

In 1670, 148 colonists arrived and settled on the west bank of the Ashley (Kiawah) River. They survived the first four years of poor crop production through the generosity of natives who shared beans and corn. They later moved to what is now Charleston.

In 1890, planters organized the first sailing regatta at Rockville, less than a mile from the tea garden. The 120th Rockville Regatta was held in August 2010.

In more recent times, the Lipton Tea Company operated an experimental tea farm on Wadmalaw Island from 1960 until 1987, when it was sold to Mack Fleming and Bill Hall. They converted the experimental farm into a working tea garden. The Charleston Tea Garden used a converted cotton picker and tobacco harvester to mechanically harvest the tea. The Charleston Tea Garden sold tea by mail order, known as American Classic Tea, and also produced Sam's Choice Instant Tea, sold through Sam's Clubs. American Classic Tea has been the official tea of the White House since 1987. In 2003, Bigelow Tea Company purchased the Charleston Tea Garden and temporarily closed the garden in order to renovate it. The garden reopened in January 2006. Tours are now offered of this last remaining working tea farm in America.
