= Charleston Tea Garden =

American tea plantation in South Carolina

Coordinates: 32.61972°N 80.1856°W

The Charleston Tea Garden is located about twenty miles south of Charleston, South Carolina, on Wadmalaw Island. Owned by the Bigelow Tea Company, it grows the tea sold under the brand name American Classic Tea and Charleston Tea Garden from the Camellia sinensis plant. It formerly hosted the annual First Flush Festival to celebrate the beginning of the harvest season.

== History ==
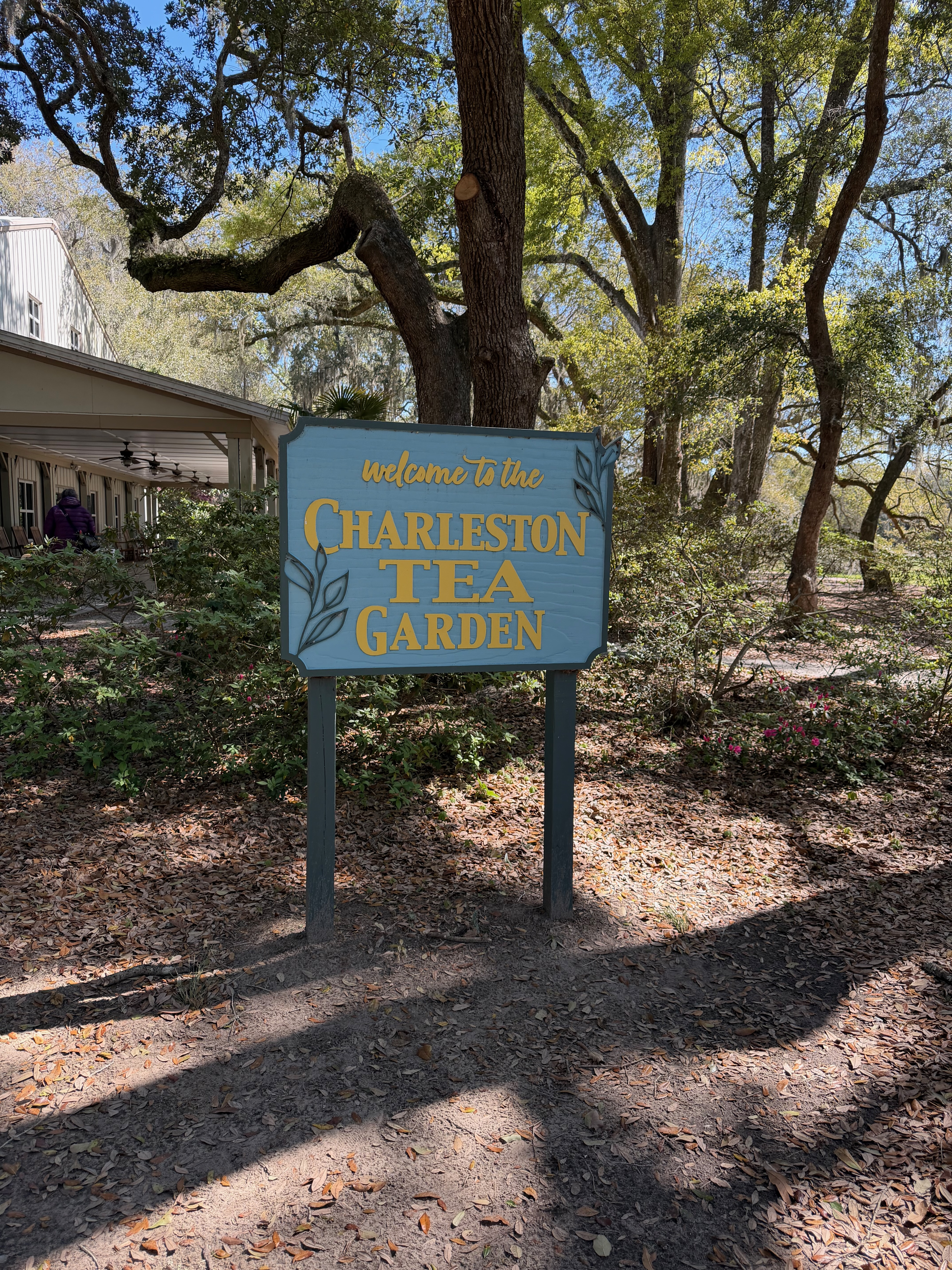
Welcome sign and visitor center

In the late 1700s, French botanist André Michaux brought the Camellia sinensis plant to the United States and gave it to Henry Middleton. They planted the tea at Middleton’s plantation. The tea seemed to thrive in areas like Charleston and Georgetown. It took many attempts by multiple companies and individuals to successfully establish a tea company without an early failure. These failures included plantations in Georgetown, Greenville, and Summerville, the longest of which lasted less than twenty years. The Thomas J Lipton Company, fearing an inability to import tea due to unrest in tea producing countries and the inability to import Chinese tea, decided to create a research and development center on Wadmalaw Island. In 1960, they bought the former Pinehurst Tea Plantation in Summerville and in 1963 they moved out to Wadmalaw Island and operated a research station for about twenty-five years. The Charleston Tea Garden, as it is known today, was established in 1987 when Mack Fleming and William (Bill) Barclay Hall bought the land and the research station from the Lipton Company. Mack Fleming—a horticultural professor at Trident Technical College—had been running the garden for the Lipton Company and Bill Hall was a third generation tea tester from England. Along with establishing the garden, they created the American Classic Tea brand. This tea is still grown at the garden as of 2012 and the brand continued even though the Fleming-Hall partnership did not last past 2003. They had some differences in opinion on how to run the garden and ran into trouble when profit margins began to drop. The garden was put up for auction at this point, where the R.C. Bigelow Company in Connecticut bought it for $1.28 million. Bill Hall joined Bigelow at the garden and keeps it running and growing the tea to sell across the United States. The Charleston Tea Garden was opened to locals and tourists to visit and tour the grounds and the factory. The Garden changed its name from Charleston Tea Plantation in June 2020 owing to negative historical connotations of "plantation" in the United States and to clarify its lack of connection to antebellum slavery; "tea plantation" is otherwise used as a neutral term worldwide.

== Tea ==
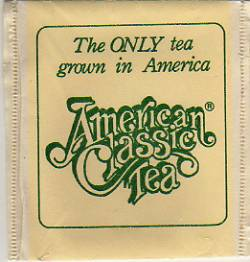
American Classic Tea Bag. Grown at the Charleston Tea Garden

The garden uses the Camellia sinensis plant to produce the black tea. It is a bush that the workers have to keep manicured and in straight rows in order to harvest properly. These bushes grow from clones, not seeds to ensure that every plant grown at the garden is exactly the same to keep the flavor of the tea consistent from season to season. Mack Fleming, while working for Lipton, invented the Green Giant—a cross between a cotton picker and tobacco harvester—which is still used today to harvest the tea leaves. This machine cuts off the top layer of leaves from the bushes, collects them, and then they are taken to the factory for the rest of the production process. The main point of production is to dry the leaves. The leaves go through a series of drying processes where first they are laid out for twelve to eighteen hours to wither, then the oxidation process for a little under an hour, and finally they are baked to remove the rest of the moisture. The excess sticks and fibers are removed and the tea is packaged. The tea is harvested from May to October.

The garden packages American Classic Tea and Charleston Tea Garden tea. It sells nine different flavors in tea bags or the loose tea form and 5 flavors in ready to drink bottle teas. These flavors include the regular American Classic Tea, Charleston Breakfast, Governor Grey, Plantation Peach, Rockville Raspberry, Carolina Mint, Cinnamon Spice, Island Green Tea, Island Green Tea with Mint. Wal-Mart formerly sold the tea under its American Choice label, which has helped the local farm get word out to more consumers. As a small farm, they needed a way to spread their name and make sure the people in the United States knew about their locally grown tea and they hoped consumers would jump on the bandwagon of buying local products. It helped when the White House discovered the locally grown tea and since 1987, the American Classic Tea brand of the Charleston Tea Garden has been the official tea of the White House.

== The Garden ==
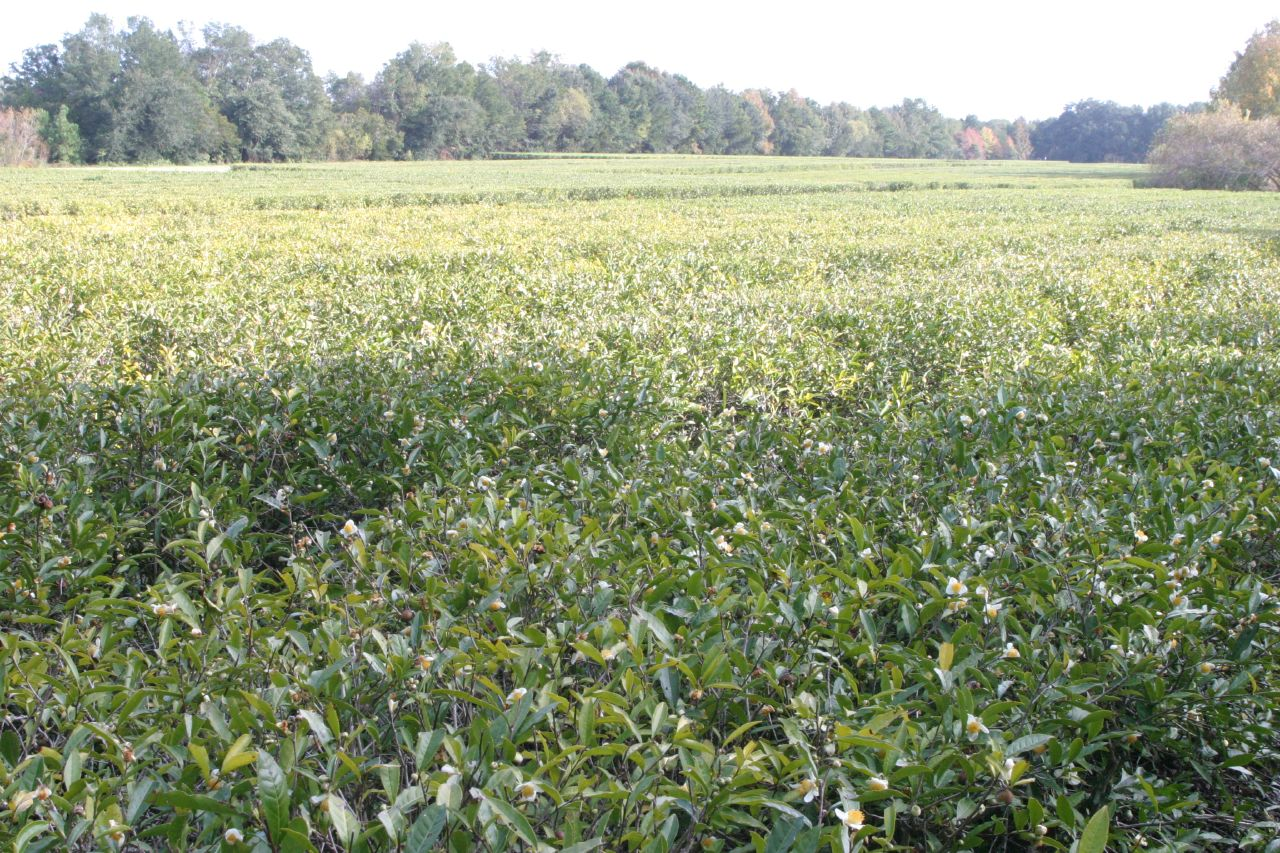
Fields at the Garden

The Charleston Tea Garden is located on Wadmalaw Island, outside of Charleston, South Carolina and is open to visitors every day of the week. Admission is free and they offer tours, tea tastings, and other amenities. The factory tour takes visitors inside the factory and covers history, harvesting, and production. The Trolley Tour covers the grounds and the growing of the Camellia sinensis plant to produce the tea. The garden also offers a tour guided by Bill Hall, called the Bill Hall Exclusive, which covers every aspect of the garden in more detail. Group tours and school field trips frequent the garden and private events are often held on the grounds. There are multiple spaces for weddings, receptions, and corporate events offered by the garden.

Since Bigelow bought the Charleston Tea Garden, they have been working on updating the machinery, the process, and expanding the grounds as well as production. They planned to have an increase Camellia sinensis plants to help increase production. Drawing on his many years in South America Bill Hall brought in more modern tea manufacturing equipment to update the factory. Another improvement made after Bigelow bought the farm was to upgrade the old irrigation system and install a newer, more-efficient system to help cover all of the 127 acres of tea plants. One of Bigelow’s main goals is to increase production through expansion and efficiency while retaining the charming atmosphere that so many people love to visit.

== First Flush Festival ==
The First Flush Tea Festival was an annual festival hosted by the Charleston Tea Garden marking the start of the tea harvesting season. The name, First Flush, means the new leaves that are beginning to grow on the tea plant bushes that are ready to be harvested for production. The garden served the visitors the first tea produced in the new season for free by allowing them the chance to taste it in hopes of pulling in new customers. The garden also brought in local food vendors to set up booths and local musicians to entertain the crowds. There was always an area for kids as well, including a playground or jump castle. The festival began in 2006 and ended after the ninth annual First Flush Festival.
