= Johns Island, South Carolina =

Island in South Carolina, United States

Coordinates: 32°42′09″N 80°02′53″W

Johns Island
- Interactive map of Johns Island

Administration
- United States
- State: South Carolina
- County: Charleston County

John's Island in May 1973

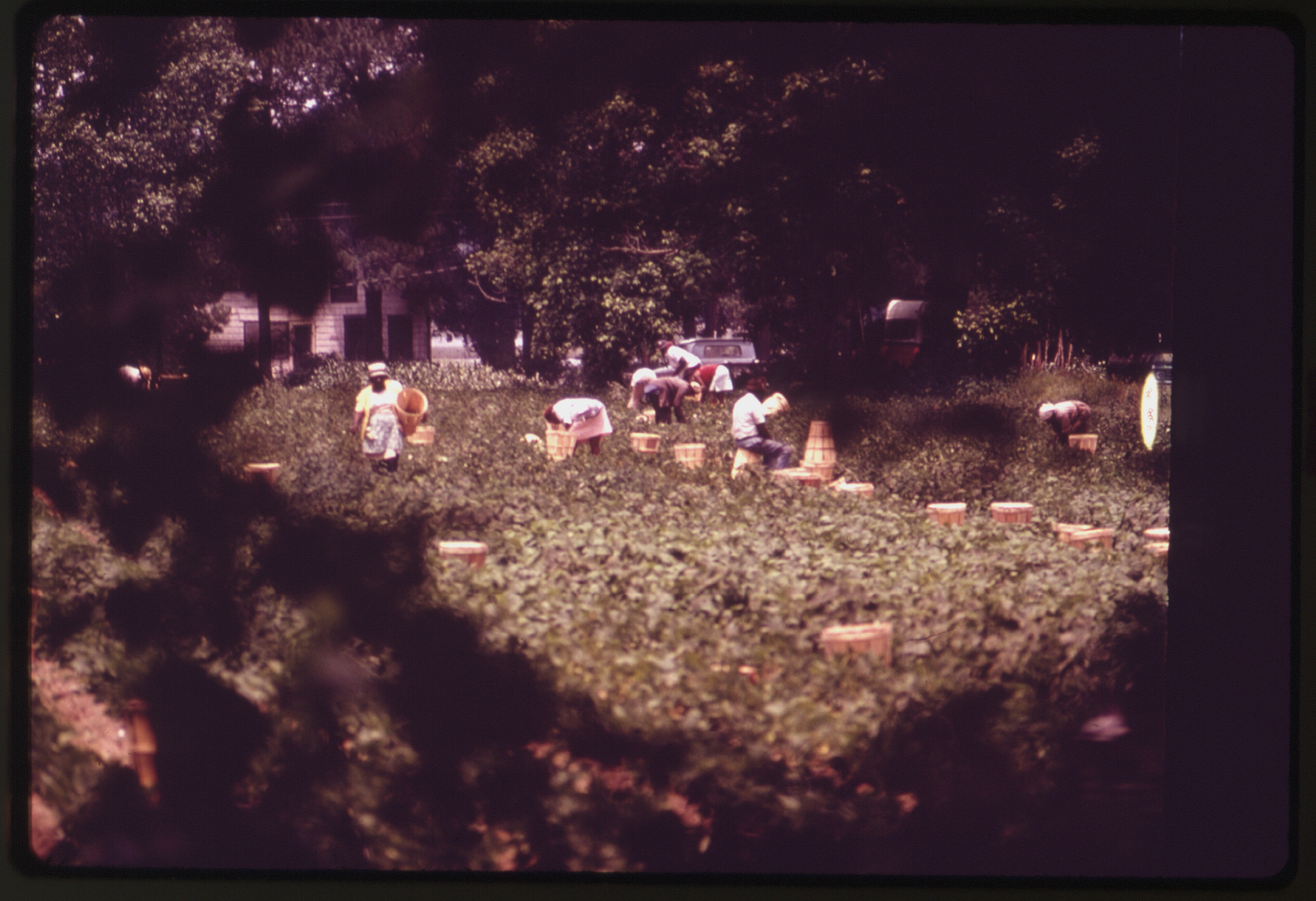
Picking beans

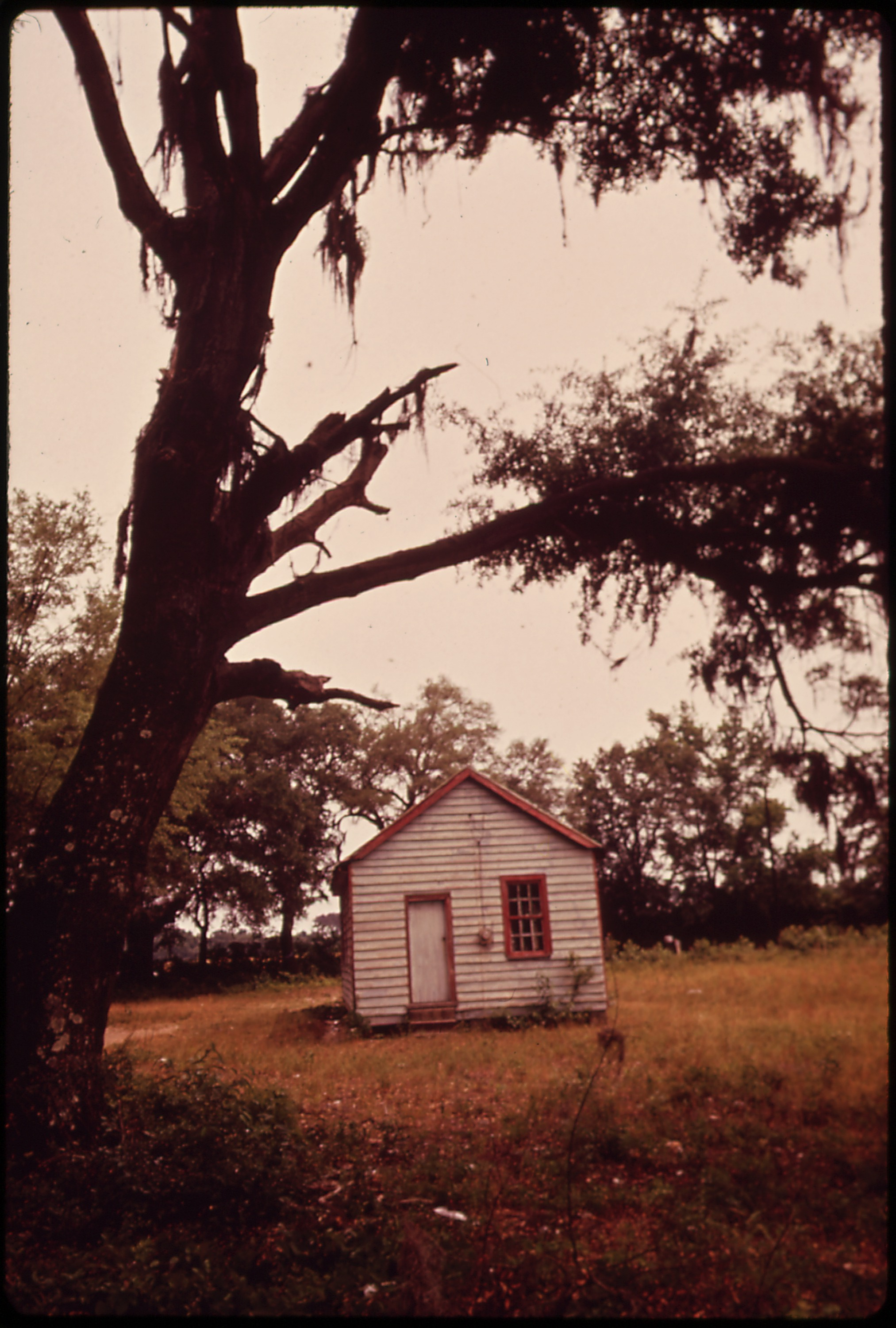
A small community church

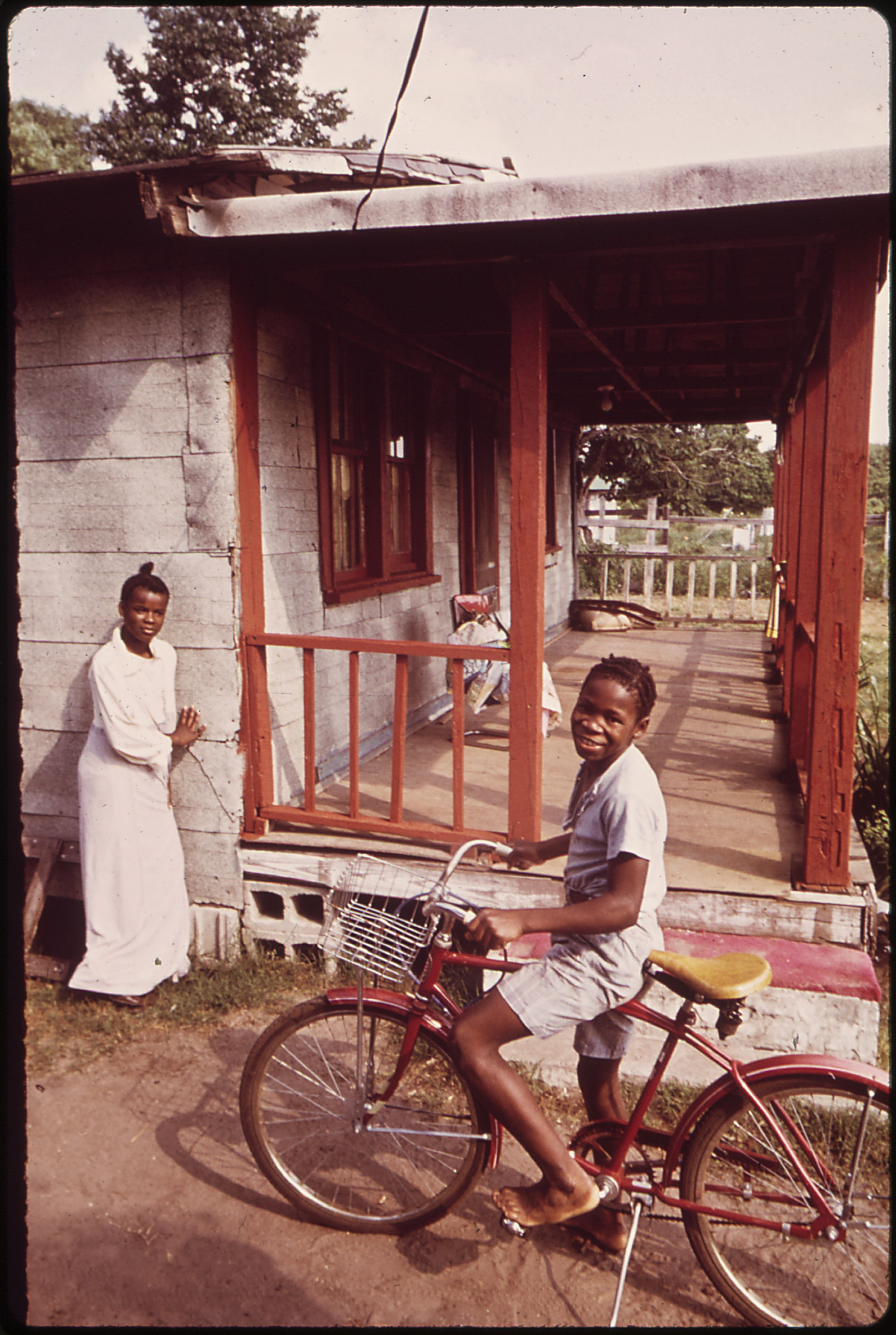
A boy and his bike

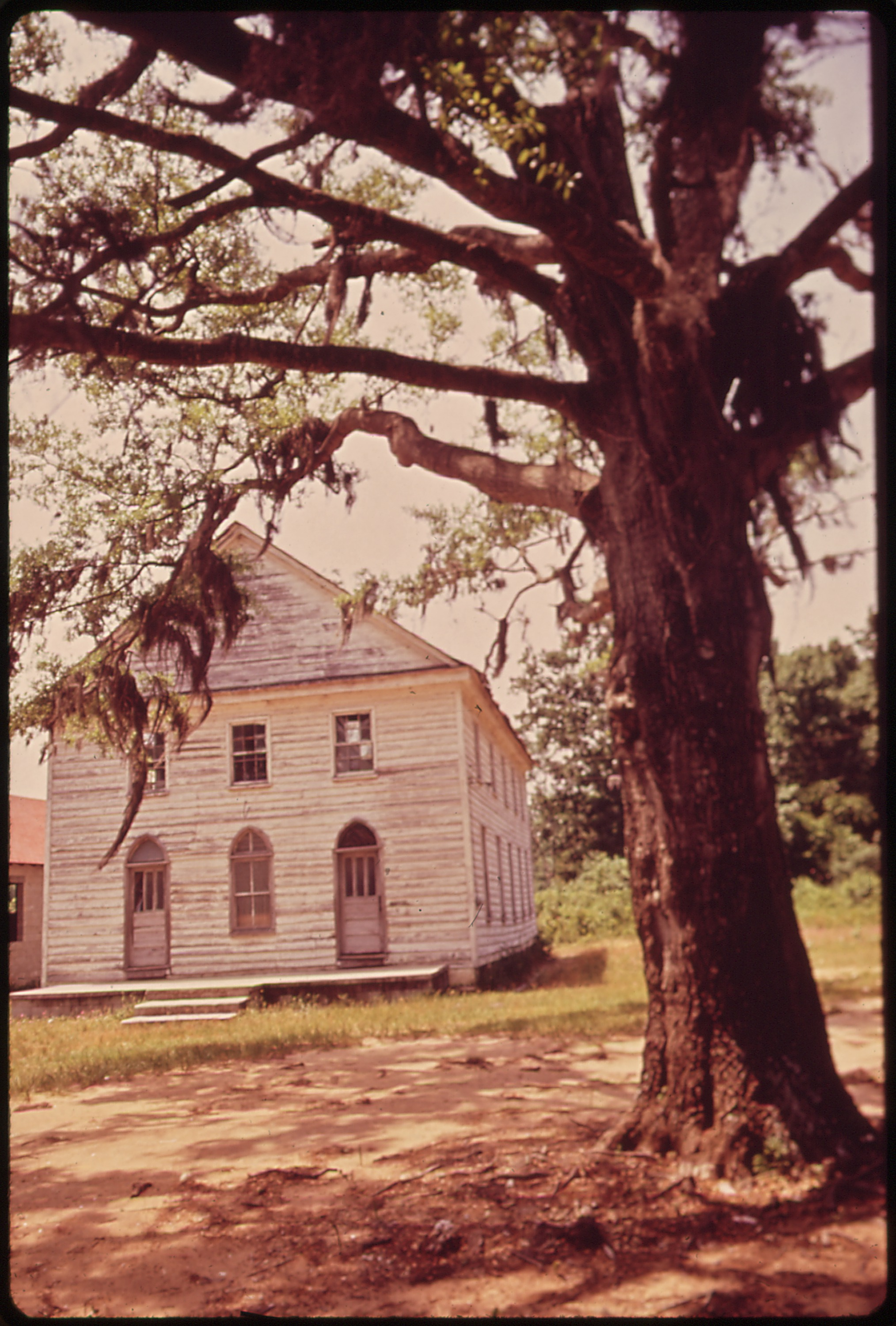
Hebron Center formerly Hebron Presbyterian Church 1868

Johns Island is an island in Charleston County, South Carolina, United States, and is the largest island in the state of South Carolina. Johns Island is bordered by the Wadmalaw, Seabrook, Kiawah, Edisto, Folly, and James islands; the Stono and Kiawah rivers separate Johns Island from its border islands. It is the fourth-largest island on the East Coast of the United States, surpassed only by Long Island, Mount Desert Island and Martha's Vineyard. Johns Island is 84 square miles (220 km^{2}) in area, with a population of 21,500.

Johns Island was named after Saint John Parish in Barbados by the first English colonial settlers on the island, who had come from there.

== Wildlife ==
The island is home to scores of wildlife species, including deer, alligators, raccoons, coyotes, bobcats, otters and wild hogs. The rivers and marshes abound with fish and shellfish, especially oysters, and dolphins. The number of bird species is in the hundreds. They include bald eagles, osprey, wild turkeys, owls, hawks, herons, egrets and ducks. The flora is abundant, with many native and imported species as well as agricultural crops.

== History ==
=== Colonial era (1670–1776) ===
Johns Island was originally inhabited by nomadic tribes of Native Americans such as the Kiawah, who survived by hunting and collecting shellfish. By the time Europeans arrived in the area, these tribes were already settled and farming off the land. Native American tribes in this area included the Stono and the Bohicket. Initially, the Stono and European settlers had good relations. But after the Stono killed some of the Europeans' livestock, the Europeans murdered several Indians in retaliation.

By the 1670s, colonists had developed scattered settlements near the water on Johns Island. Maps dating from 1695 and 1711 show plantations established on the banks of the Stono River. During the colonial period, the main crop was indigo, prized for its rich blue dye. The plantations that grew crops, including indigo, relied on slave labor.

The Stono Rebellion, which occurred on Johns Island in 1739, began as a group of slaves' attempt to escape to Spanish Florida, where they were promised freedom. Beginning in the early morning of September 9, 1739, a group of about 20 slaves met near the Stono River, led by a slave named Jemmy. The group proceeded to the Stono Bridge and raided Hutchinson's Store. They took food, ammunition, and supplies, and killed the two shopkeepers, leaving their heads on the store's front steps. The slaves crossed the Stono River and gathered more followers as they began to walk overland to Spanish Florida. The runaways encountered Lieutenant Governor William Bull and four of his comrades also traveling on the road. Bull and his companies rallied other plantation owners to help put down the uprising. The planters swept through the countryside attacking slaves, killing all who could not prove that they were forced to join the march.

=== American Revolution (1776–1785) ===
The American Revolutionary War arrived on Johns Island in May 1779 as a body of British troops under the command of General Augustine Prevost. Prevost established a small force to remain on the island, headed by Lieutenant Colonel John Maitland. Under the command of Sir Henry Clinton, more troops landed on Seabrook Island, beginning February 11, 1780. Clinton's goal was to cross Johns Island and James Island and lay siege to Charleston. His army crossed the Stono River and set up temporary headquarters at Fenwick Hall. Moving to James Island, marching up the west bank of the Ashley River to Old Town Landing and proceeding south to Charleston, Clinton besieged the city. Charleston surrendered to British forces on May 12, 1780; the occupation lasted until December 1782.

=== Civil War (1861–1865) ===
The Battle of Bloody Bridge, also known as Burden's Causeway, occurred on Johns Island in July 1864. The site of the battle is off River Road, just north of the Charleston Executive Airport. On July 2, 1864, Brig. Gen. John Hatch's Federal troops landed in the Legareville section of Johns Island. Hatch wanted to cross Johns Island, then cross the Stono River and lay siege to James Island. The Union troops met the Confederate troops where the creek turns into swamp. Around 2,000 South Carolina soldiers held off a U.S. force of roughly 8,000 men. After three days of fighting, Hatch's troops left the island.

== Background ==
Johns Island is west of James Island, east of Wadmalaw Island, and inshore of Seabrook Island and Kiawah Island. It is separated from the mainland by the tidal Stono River, which forms part of the Intracoastal Waterway. Roughly one-third of it is within the city limits of Charleston. The island is home to the Angel Oak, a southern live oak tree estimated to be 400–500 years old and named for Justus Angel, the 19th-century owner of the land on which it stands. It is also known for its farms, producing tomatoes and numerous other agricultural products.

Johns Island's population is growing. Between 2000 and 2010, it grew by 50%, the largest increase in the island's history. This trend is expected to continue, but numerous conservation organizations are striving for ecologically friendly growth.

The island's proximity to downtown Charleston and its scenic property have made it an active location for development. Numerous high-density developments have been created in parts of the island zoned into the city of Charleston. Most of the island still lies within the jurisdiction of Charleston County.

Several movies have been filmed on the island, including The Notebook (2004).

== Attractions ==
=== Johns Island Presbyterian Church ===
Johns Island Presbyterian Church on Bohicket Road was first built in 1719. The church began as part of Reverend Archibald Stobo's plan to create five Presbyterian churches in the rural areas of South Carolina. Notably, it is one of the oldest churches in the United States built from a wood frame. Johns Island Presbyterian underwent expansions in 1792 and 1823. The church is open to the public and offers tours and part of the National Register of Historic Places. As of 2012, the church was under the direction of Reverend Jon Van Deventer.

=== St John's Episcopal Church ===
This church was originally built in 1734 as a part of the Church of England. While the current church at this site was built in the 1950s, previous churches at the same location were damaged during the Revolutionary and Civil Wars. At one point in the mid-19th-century, there were more Black than White congregants, and a substantial number of enslaved communicants. Several colonial and Revolutionary War era graves can be found in the churchyard of the property.

=== Hebron Center formerly Hebron Presbyterian Church ===
The Hebron Presbyterian Church on Johns Island was organized in 1865 at the end of the Civil War, near Gregg Plantation. The first building was constructed in 1868 using shipwreck lumber found floating on Seabrook and Kiawah beaches by formerly enslaved carpenters and founding members of the church, Jackson McGill and John Chisholm. Under the leadership of the Reverend Ishmael Moultrie, the congregation went from worshipping under a bush tent to a new building in April 1970.

The church was formed when a small group of freed slaves, frustrated by the refusal of the White leaders of the local Presbyterian church to help establish their own autonomous church, submitted a petition to the Presbyterian synod in 1867 to establish a "Freedman’s church", a church erected by and for Black people. A secular tug of war then commenced in cities across the state as White elders fought to retain total control of the Presbyterian Church. Former slaves living in rural isolation were not subject to such intense scrutiny by the parochial white parishioners’ governing the church. The builders of Hebron Presbyterian Church did not wait for the church's official blessing and completed work on their church.

Black people attending the White Presbyterian church of Johns Island during slavery constituted the membership of the original Hebron Presbyterian Church. After reconstruction, the White Presbyterian Church of the South dropped all Black people, causing them to find a place of their own in which to worship. Most of the former enslaved people were determined to remain with the Presbyterian faith so they met in a bush tent, singing and praying. At that time, Moultrie went about organizing Black Presbyterian churches as mission churches to the Northern Presbyterian Church, now the Presbyterian Church USA (PCUSA).

Construction of Hebron Church began in 1865 when a tempest blew a schooner carrying a load of timber against the DeVeaux Bank, an estuarine island southwest of Kiawah at the mouth of the North Edisto River. Word of the shipwreck spread to a group of freed slaves who had constructed a bush church out of pine trees and Palmetto fronds on a plot of land near Gregg Plantation. Moultrie, an evangelist who led service at the bush church, perceived this news as a gift from God.

Born on St. Helena Island and educated at the Penn School, one of the country's first schools for freed slaves, Moultrie encouraged his congregation to shrug off the mantle of servitude and embrace their freedom by learning to read and write. His pulpit of education and his extemporaneous style of preaching made him a popular figure among the community that inhabited the Sea Islands and his influence was felt from Johns Island to Wadmalaw to Edisto.

When word of the marooned schooner and its bounty of timber reached Moultrie, he dispatched the heartiest members of the bush church to row out to the shipwreck. The errant material was collected and slowly towed to shore, where a covey of oxen cart carried it across Hope Plantation to the site that would become home to the area's first church built by and for freed slaves. They named the church Hebron in honor of the ancient holy city referenced in the book of Genesis.

Jackson McGill and John Chisholm were carpenters whose skills were developed during enslavement. The mortise and tenon timber-frame structure is one of the few that remain on John's Island and it is the oldest freestanding structure built by freed slaves. They constructed a handsome building which consisted of a narthex and balconies along three of its four walls to maximize the number of congregants who could fit in the church. This building served as a spiritual center of the island's formerly enslaved population for almost 100 years when the congregation moved to a newer building. It remains one of Johns Island's greatest landmarks.

Much of the history does not exist in written annals, but the congregation was a robust 225 members, which was not recorded by the Presbyterian church until 1873. The Church prospered and in 1965 it was decided to erect a new church. Each member was taxed $100 in support of the new building fund and fundraising progressed until 1969, when construction began. Work was slow, taking place when the members had time and money. In November 1976, the congregation moved to the new brick church at 2915 Bohicket Road, and the old church sat empty.

In 1980 a group of Franciscan nuns helped convert the historic church into a senior citizens' center. Sisters Irene Kelly and Bernadine Jax were in search of an ecumenical outpost on Johns Island since the Charleston Dioceses had only one small church for the entire island. A meeting with Hebron's Pastor, J.W. Washington, yielded a partnership, and the sisters founded the Hebron St Francis Senior Citizen Center, a ministry and soup kitchen for elder citizens, in the empty Hebron Church building.

By the mid-1980s people of all faiths were congregating at the old church for a weekly dose of spiritual enlightenment and nourishment. A small kitchen was created where the altar had stood, and tables were filled with handicrafts. A quilting group was formed and they created beautiful quilts with material they collected,

In 1989, Hurricane Hugo struck, damaging its foundation and giving it a slight lean. The Franciscans left and this void was filled by Alfreda Gibbs Smiley LaBoard. She became the heart of the Hebron group meeting in the damaged building. Laboard became friends with Mary Whyte, a painter of note. One day LaBoard was taking a pan of hot cornbread from the oven and Whyte arrived and observed that "The cornbread was burnt on one end because the floor of the church was slanted". They became friends and this friendship was chronicled in the book Afreda’s World. The book's fame resulted in boxes of cloth for the quilters arriving from places as far away as Mexico and Hawaii, and a mini Renaissance was begun.

The building continued to deteriorate, and an alarmed Whyte spread the word of the historical treasure to a handful of Kiawah residents who did not take long to become active. The congregation and dedicated community members hosted its first Gullah Gala in 2003 to raise awareness of the church's history and needs. Fundraising began with a candlelight service with quilts hung from the rafters. The fundraising focused first on repairing a leaky roof and the tilting of the walls. This created new hope for the congregation, but three years after the first gala, the group lost their Matriarch, Alfreda LaBoard. More than 600 people attended her funeral. In Reverend River's eulogy, he characterized LaBoard's life as one of suffering, selfless service to others and strength born from faith. LaBoard also served as an inspiration to Whyte and the architect hired for the restoration, Christopher Rose.

During the restoration it was revealed that the wooden cants of the balcony floor joists possess a distinctive curvature, which suggests the rostrum of the shipwrecked schooner was reused in the church. This appears to confirm the oral history of the church.

=== Angel Oak ===
Angel Oak, Johns Island, South Carolina

The Angel Oak is a living southern live oak tree on Johns Island. Once believed to be 1500 years old, current estimates of the oak's age are 400 to 500 years. The oak is 65 ft (20 m) tall, with a trunk circumference of 25.5 ft (7.8 m). In spite of the popular belief that the Angel Oak is the oldest tree east of the Mississippi River, many baldcypress trees throughout the south are hundreds of years older. The Angel Oak stands on part of the land given to Jacob Waight in 1717 as part of a land grant. The Angel Oak was acquired by the City of Charleston in 1991. Today, Angel Oak Park provides visitors a close look at the tree. The park area has a gift shop and picnic tables.

=== Mullet Hall Equestrian Center ===
Mullet Hall Equestrian Center is on Mullet Hall Road on Johns Island. With 738 acres and 20 miles of trails, it is home to equestrian competitions, festivals, and events. Planning for the Mullet Hall Equestrian Center began in 2000. It includes four show rings, one Grand Prix ring, 40 acres of grass fields, 196 horse stalls, and jumping and lunging areas.

=== Battle of Charleston reenactment ===
An annual Battle of Charleston reenactment is held at Legare Farms, off River Road on Johns Island. The event began in 2004 and includes battle reenactments, food, music, and culture of the 19th century. One of the battles reenacted includes the Johns Island 1864 "Battle of Bloody Bridge". As of 2013 this event is a "timeline" reenactment of all American wars. Currently this event is on a permanent hiatus.

In addition to the John's Island Presbyterian Church, the Moving Star Hall and The Progressive Club are listed on the National Register of Historic Places.

== Education ==
Septima Poinsette Clark taught at Promise Land School from 1916 to 1919. She returned to Johns Island, where she taught children during the day and illiterate adults on her own time at night.

Charleston County School District operates public schools:

- Angel Oak Elementary School
- Mount Zion Elementary School
- Haut Gap Middle School
- St. John's High School

Private schools:

- Charleston Collegiate School is a college preparatory school on the island; it serves students in the Charleston area in grades K4-12.
- Capers Preparatory Christian Academy
- Montessori School of Johns Island is a Montessori school on the island, serving children of Charleston area. It is off Main Road, near West Ashley, serving children from 12 weeks to 12 years.

== Library ==
=== Johns Island Branch Library ===
The Johns Island Branch Library, off Maybank Highway, is part of the Charleston County Public Library system. The $4.3 million library, which opened in 2004, is the largest of the Charleston County Public Library branches. At 16,000 square feet, it is more than twice the size of the county's normal library branches. It was built to serve Johns Island, Wadmalaw Island, Kiawah Island and Seabrook Island. Planning of the library took five years, with the groundbreaking in December 2003.

== Bridges ==
- John F. Limehouse Memorial Bridge
- Paul J. Gelegotis Memorial Bridge
