= Wauregan, Connecticut =

Census-designated place in Connecticut, United States

- Wauregan Historic District
- U.S. National Register of Historic Places
- U.S. Historic district
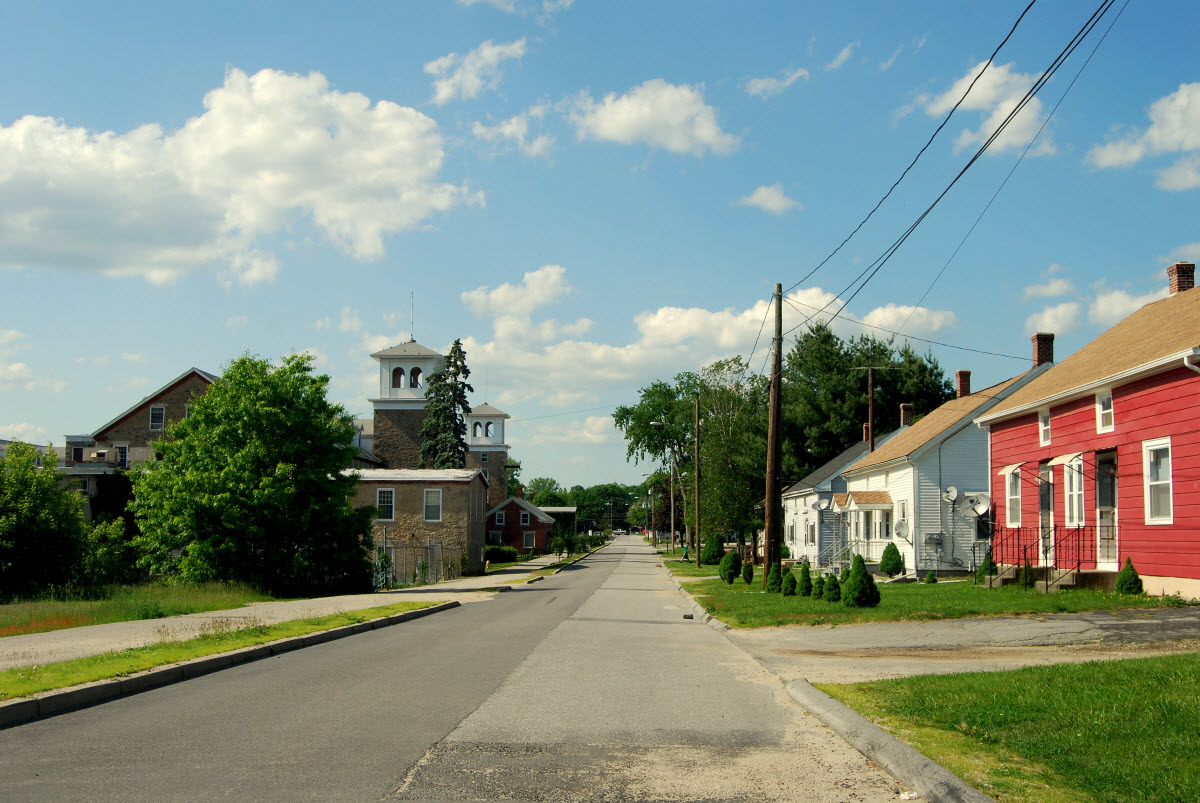

- Location in Windham County and the state of Connecticut.
- Location: Roughly bounded by CT 12, CT 205, Third Street, Quinebaug River, and Chestnut Street, Plainfield, Connecticut
- Coordinates: 41°44′38″N 71°54′38″W
- Area: 90 acres (36 ha)
- Architectural style: Greek Revival, Late Victorian
- NRHP reference No.: 79003789
- Added to NRHP: August 24, 1979

Wauregan is a village located in the northwestern corner of the town of Plainfield, Connecticut, United States. Originally a mill village, Wauregan was established around a cotton mill powered by the Quinebaug River. Wauregan and West Wauregan, across the Quinebaug in the town of Brooklyn, together comprise the Wauregan census-designated place, with a population of 1,539 at the 2020 census.

A 90-acre (360,000 m^{2}) portion of the original village area is listed as a historic district, the Wauregan Historic District, encompassing structures that are directly related to the economic and social activities of the mill. The district was listed on the National Register of Historic Places in 1979. Extant buildings in the Wauregan historic district include the Wauregan Mill, an H-shaped building built from local fieldstone; James Atwood's home; the two boarding houses; the company store; and over one hundred workers' houses. Architectural styles represented include Greek Revival and Late Victorian architecture.

== History ==
Named for a Mohegan word meaning "Pleasant Valley" Wauregan has a long history as an industrial village. In 1850, Amos D. Lockwood, who was involved with the Quinebaug Mill in Danielsonville, bought the water privileges and surrounding land at Wauregan. After the Wauregan Mills Company charter was approved by the Connecticut legislature in 1853, the first mill was constructed circa 1853–1854. Wauregan Mills was well known for its woven cotton goods, including various types of flannel. Lockwood became the mill's first agent and recruited James S. Atwood as his superintendent, who became responsible for setting up all machinery and starting production. The principal product of Wauregan was cotton sheeting.

James S. Atwood, who purchased the mill from Lockwood in 1858, took particular interest in the village surrounding the mill, making it what he considered to be a "model hamlet" where his factory's employees "could find attractive and comfortable homes near their daily tasks." Under James S. Atwood's leadership, Wauregan began to prosper. The mill was expanded, workers' houses were built, and several amenities to Wauregan village life were added. Worker housing in the village included 104 company-owned buildings containing 255 tenement apartments for rental to workers, plus two boarding houses for unmarried workers. A railroad station was built in 1859 and a post office was established in 1860. A company store was built in 1875 and operated with subsidies from the company. Another building in the mill village housed a firehouse, clubhouse, jail, and a reading room and library. A dairy farm and nearby woodlands were also part of the mill operation. Atwood quadrupled the size of the factory, adding the south mill of the front block in 1859 and the entire rear block in 1867–68. The mill's labor force was around 750 people, with most living within the village. The mill would eventually reach a capacity of 56,616 spindles and 1,464 looms, with an annual output of eleven million yards.

When James S. Atwood died, management of Wauregan Mills was passed on to his twin sons, James Arthur and John Walter Atwood. The Atwood brothers continued to expand and improve the mill, which employed 325 men and 160 women and children as of 1917. The Atwood brothers successfully responded to the competition of the newer, steam-powered mills by producing finer quality cotton goods such as shirting for the U.S. Marine Corps, and later rayon, instead of the traditional cotton sheeting. Wauregan Mills had a close working relationship with DuPont and was one of the pioneers of synthetic fabric. This partnership led to the development of the technology to produce fabric made of a blend of wool and rayon. In contrast to many larger, corporate-owned mills that were wedded to a particular product, the economic organization of Wauregan Mills enabled its owner/managers to easily diversify and change its product mix to meet new demands resulting from competition from newer textile centers, allowing them to stay profitable through World War II, much longer than many other larger mills.

After World War II, Wauregan Mills entered a period of decline from which it never recovered. In the 1950s, free trade policies with Japan, which had modern equipment shipped to them by the U.S. as part of post-war reconstruction enabling them to produce fine cotton goods much more cheaply, resulted in the death of the New England textile industry as cheap cotton goods flooded the U.S. market. Wauregan Mills tried to emphasize their capabilities in synthetic blend output and also to reduce labor costs by negotiating with the labor unions to eliminate certain fringe benefits. In August 1955, torrential rains from Hurricanes Connie and Diane caused many dams along the Quinebaug River to break, including the one at Wauregan. The mill was flooded to the level of the first floor ceilings. Workers tried to salvage as much cloth, raw materials and machinery as they could but ultimately the company lost more than $1,500,000. The company borrowed a large sum of money in order to be able to resume production but they didn't have enough working capital to repair and modernize their facilities. In 1957, James Arthur Atwood III, grandson of James S. Atwood, and the rest of the company directors decided to cease all operations resulting in the company's final closing.

James Arthur Atwood III was responsible for disposing of the company's assets to pay off their creditors. Land, the water company, and other properties were sold, and the mill rented to various tenants over the next decade. American Standard was one of the early buyers and built a manufacturing facility in Wauregan soon after the Wauregan company closed. All the debts of Wauregan Mill were eventually paid off in 1970. In 1974, C&M Corporation, a vertically integrated manufacturer of electrical cable, owned and occupied the former Wauregan Mills complex, where it operated as a production facility and as its corporate headquarters. In 2014, the Wauregan Mill was sold to a real estate management company.

The village is described as looking "much as it did in the 1850s." The Wauregan Historic District was listed on the National Register of Historic Places in 1979.

== Geography ==
The village is centered on the former site of the mill on the east bank of the Quinebaug River, near where modern Route 205 crosses the river. The village extends eastward from the river up a gently rising slope towards Route 12 located at the crest of a ridge. The mill workers' houses are located along Walnut and Chestnut streets just east of the mill site, while the supervisor's houses and the company store are located further east (and further up in elevation). The mill owners' houses and the church are even further up and east. The historic district covers an area of about 90 acres (360,000 m^{2}), roughly bounded on the east by Grove Street, Fountain Street, Route 12, Route 205, and South Chestnut Street; on the south by Third Street; on the west by South Walnut Street, a westward extension of First Street, and the Quinebaug River; and on the north by the extension of the east–west portion of North Chestnut Street. The boundaries of the historic district exclude a large tract of open land to the north that the Wauregan company once owned. The district includes 114 buildings and structures.

According to the United States Census Bureau, the Wauregan CDP has a total area of 1.7 square miles (4.3 km^{2}), of which 0.02 square miles (0.05 km^{2}), or 1.25%, are water. The CDP includes, in addition to the original village, the village of West Wauregan across the Quinebaug River in the town of Brooklyn, as well as tracts of open land to the north, newer residential development to the south, and modern commercial properties along Route 12.

== Demographics ==
=== 2020 census ===
As of the 2020 census, Wauregan had a population of 1,539. The median age was 35.5 years. 25.2% of residents were under the age of 18 and 10.6% of residents were 65 years of age or older. For every 100 females there were 101.7 males, and for every 100 females age 18 and over there were 100.2 males age 18 and over.

80.2% of residents lived in urban areas, while 19.8% lived in rural areas.

There were 564 households in Wauregan, of which 33.9% had children under the age of 18 living in them. Of all households, 49.1% were married-couple households, 15.8% were households with a male householder and no spouse or partner present, and 23.6% were households with a female householder and no spouse or partner present. About 24.2% of all households were made up of individuals and 6.6% had someone living alone who was 65 years of age or older.

There were 596 housing units, of which 5.4% were vacant. The homeowner vacancy rate was 0.3% and the rental vacancy rate was 6.4%.

Racial composition as of the 2020 census
Race	Number	Percent
White	1,318	85.6%
Black or African American	20	1.3%
American Indian and Alaska Native	3	0.2%
Asian	28	1.8%
Native Hawaiian and Other Pacific Islander	1	0.1%
Some other race	25	1.6%
Two or more races	144	9.4%
Hispanic or Latino (of any race)	83	5.4%

=== 2000 census ===
As of the census of 2000, there were 1,085 people, 378 households, and 288 families residing in the CDP. The population density was 1,211.5 inhabitants per square mile (467.8/km^{2}). There were 410 housing units at an average density of 457.8 per square mile (176.8/km^{2}). The racial makeup of the CDP was 94.56% White, 1.29% African American, 0.46% Native American, 0.55% Asian, 0.65% from other races, and 2.49% from two or more races. Hispanic or Latino of any race were 3.87% of the population.

There were 378 households, out of which 50.0% had children under the age of 18 living with them, 48.9% were married couples living together, 19.3% had a female householder with no husband present, and 23.8% were non-families. 16.4% of all households were made up of individuals, and 6.3% had someone living alone who was 65 years of age or older. The average household size was 2.87 and the average family size was 3.15.

In the CDP, the population was spread out, with 34.0% under the age of 18, 9.2% from 18 to 24, 34.0% from 25 to 44, 15.6% from 45 to 64, and 7.2% who were 65 years of age or older. The median age was 29 years. For every 100 females, there were 96.6 males. For every 100 females age 18 and over, there were 91.4 males.

The median income for a household in the CDP was $33,846, and the median income for a family was $30,795. Males had a median income of $33,224 versus $24,821 for females. The per capita income for the CDP was $15,311. About 3.6% of families and 8.0% of the population were below the poverty line, including 6.2% of those under age 18 and none of those age 65 or over.

== Notable buildings ==
Wauregan Mills	The main mill building, which is currently vacant, is H-shaped, with the first section (northern half of front mill) first constructed in 1853. This section has four stories and is about 250 by 50 feet (15 m) with a hoist tower topped with an Italianate belfry. In 1858, the southern half of the front mill was built with an identical tower. The rear or western mill was built after the Civil War in 1867–68. The two buildings are connected by a center section spanning the wheel pits in the power canal. The rear mill has five stories and also has two towers on its eastern facade but without belfries. One the ends of each building are smaller structures originally used as picker houses, where raw cotton bales are first opened.
Company Store	The former company store, now occupied by the Connecticut Mop Manufacturing Company, was built in 1875. The 2½-story building was designed with a combination of Italianate and Greek Revival styles and has a clapboard-covered, asphalt-shingled roof. The Greek revival style is highlighted by the paneled corner pilasters while the Italianate detailing is shown by the cornice brackets and bracketed door hoods. The company store enabled workers to buy fresh food and milk that were produced in the company farm north of the village.
Former Congregational Church	The Wauregan Congregational Church was built in 1873 in the High Victorian Gothic style with its wooden trim worked to look like stone buttresses and corbelling. The church has since been demolished. The main facade had double entry doors under an arched portico. Above the portico was a stained glass window. A bell tower also stood on the east of the main facade.
Former firehouse and clubhouse	The former Wauregan firehouse and clubhouse on Front Street is a two-story structure that was originally used by the Atwood Hose Company, which was organized in 1898. The upper floor was used as a reading room and the village jail was attached to this building. The building is now used as a coffee shop.
Atwood Hose Fire Company	The modern fire house now used by the Atwood Hose Company was built in 1981 and is located on Route 205 further east from the original fire house. It is a two-bay cement block structure with brick front facade.
Wauregan Post Office	
Mill workers' housing	
Supervisors' houses	There are eight extant duplex supervisors' houses in the village that are located further uphill from the mill from the workers' houses. These supervisors' houses were built in two distinct time periods. The earliest houses were built with Greek revival elements with three of the surviving supervisor's houses exhibiting this style. The later houses (five surviving structures) are plainer-looking with some Victorian detailing. These houses have fieldstone foundations and gable roofs. The main facade has a central double entrance under a wide, flat-roofed portico and is six bays wide.
Boarding houses	
J.W. Atwood residence (Putnam Road)	
J.S. Atwood residence (Brooklyn Road)	
Frank Barber & Son Livery	Francois Bombardier and son Joseph's livery was at the end of S. Walnut Street. The livery rented out horses and carriages as well as supplied two hearses, one black and one white, for local funerals.

== See also ==
- National Register of Historic Places listings in Windham County, Connecticut
