= Amos D. Lockwood =

Amos DeForest Lockwood
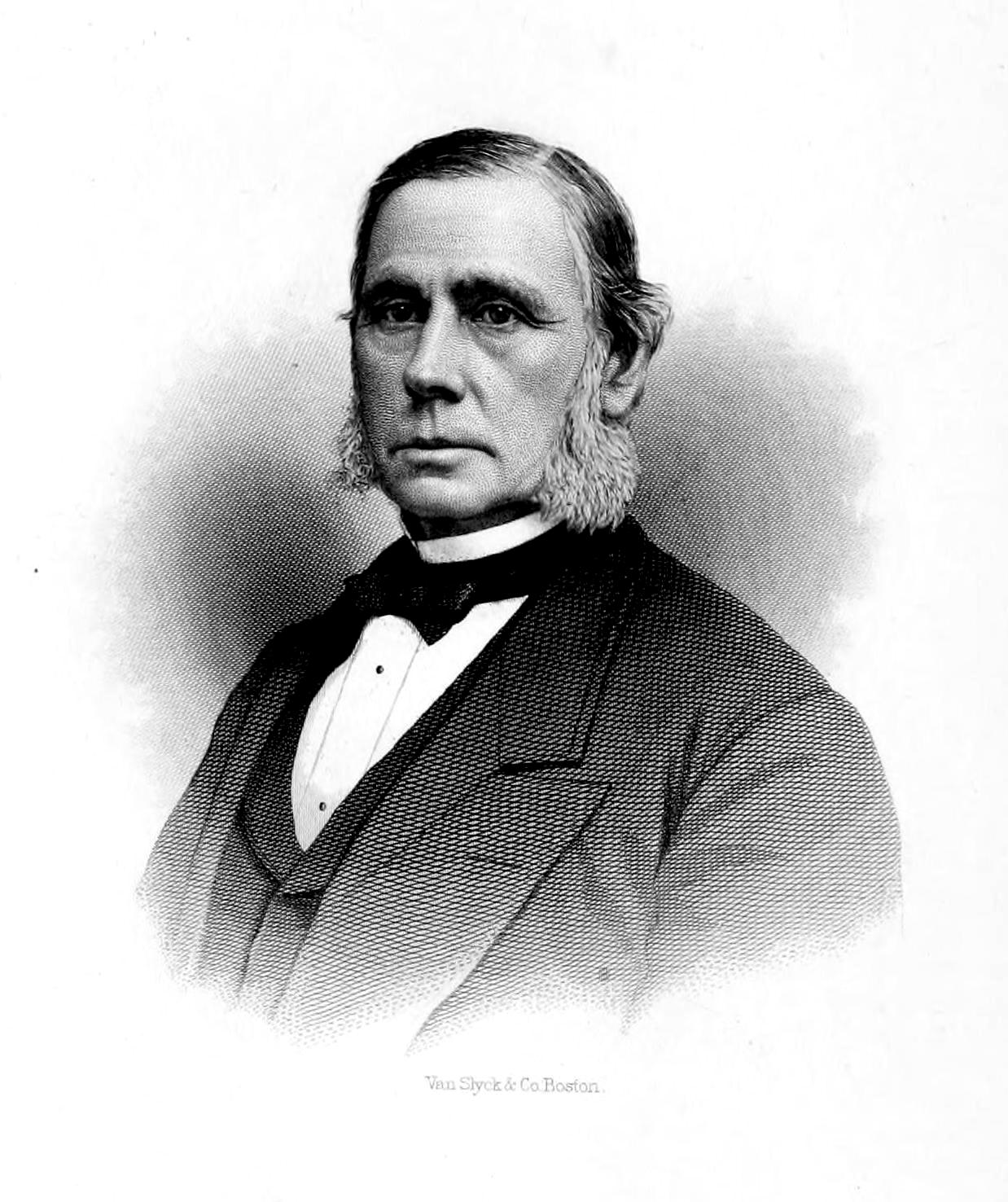
- Amos D. Lockwood, circa 1879
- Born: Amos DeForest Lockwood; October 30, 1811; Pawtuxet, Rhode Island
- Died: January 16, 1884 (aged 72); Providence, Rhode Island
- Occupations: Manufacturer, engineer

Amos DeForest Lockwood (1811–1884) was an American manufacturer and engineer based in Providence, Rhode Island. He was self-trained as a mechanical engineer, and gradually expanded his scope to all areas of textile mill construction. He was a cofounder, in 1882, of Lockwood, Greene & Company, which would become one of the largest engineering firms in the United States in the twentieth century.

== Life and career ==
Amos D. Lockwood was born October 30, 1811, in Pawtuxet, Rhode Island, to Captain Benoni Lockwood II and Phebe (Greene) Lockwood. His older brother was ship captain Benoni Lockwood III. He was a descendant of Roger Williams.

At the time of his birth, Lockwood's father was a sea captain, but when he was six the family moved to Providence where Benoni Lockwood took up surveying and civil engineering. At the age of sixteen, the younger Lockwood moved to Rehoboth to work in the store of the Orleans Manufacturing Company, owned by David Wilkinson and Benjamin Peck. After two years he began working as an operative in the Orleans mill, where he remained for another two years.

In 1832 he was appointed assistant superintendent of the mills of Almy, Brown & Slater, later S. & J. Slater, in Slatersville, becoming resident agent in 1835. In 1843 Lockwood, along with his brother Moses B. Lockwood (Note: Moses Brown Lockwood was born August 25, 1815 in Pawtuxet. He was educated at what is now the Moses Brown School, where he would later teach. He was principal of the school from 1835 to 1838. From 1838 to 1843 he worked in his father's civil engineering firm. When the original A. D. Lockwood & Company was formed, Moses B. managed the firm's business office in Providence. When the Quinebaug and Wauregan Mills were established, Moses B. was appointed treasurer of each. He continued in that role at Wauregan only until 1858, but was treasurer at Quinebaug until his death, which occurred May 13, 1872 in Providence.) and brother-in-law Rhodes B. Chapman, formed the partnership of A. D. Lockwood & Company and leased the mills at Slatersville. In 1851 they bought into the Quinebaug Mills at Brooklyn, Connecticut, taking over management. In 1853 Lockwood organized the Wauregan Mills at Plainfield, Connecticut. The mills were built to Lockwood's design, and from that point forward he was sought after as a mill engineer. In the same year, Lockwood gave up the lease at Slatersville. In 1855 he reorganized the Pacific Mills at Lawrence, and in 1858 was appointed mechanical engineer of the Franklin Company and associated enterprises at Lewiston, Maine, and in 1860 was also appointed resident agent. Lockwood's predecessor at Lewiston was the noted "mill doctor" David Whitman (1799-1858), who had begun a mill machinery repair service in 1832.

Lockwood's first project in Lewiston was the organization and construction of the Androscoggin Mill, begun in 1860. This was followed by the Lewiston Mill in the same year. In 1861 he built Hill Mill No. 6 and supervised the reconstruction of the main dam of the Franklin Company. In 1864 he was among the purchasers from Thomas J. Hill of the Lewiston Foundry, which they reorganized as the Lewiston Machine Company. Before 1871 Lockwood was consulting engineer to the companies at Lewiston, the Pepperell Mills in Biddeford, the James Mills at Newburyport, the Naumkeag Mills at Salem and others, as well as maintaining his role as senior partner of A. D. Lockwood & Company. In 1871 Lockwood established an independent office in Boston for the practice of mechanical engineering. However, the death of his brother and partner in May and the Great Boston Fire in November 1872, which destroyed his office and records, led him to return to Providence in 1873, though he would keep his engineering office in Boston for another two years. Though Lockwood now dealt directly with the management of the Quinebaug Mills, he did not end his engineering work. In 1873 he directed the reconstruction of the Otis Company's Palmer mills at Three Rivers, as well as improvements to the Boston Manufacturing Company mills at Waltham. In 1874 he organized and built the Lockwood Mills at Waterville, Maine, considered a model mill. In spring of 1875, he organized a new A. D. Lockwood & Company, to manage his manufacturing interests as well as engineering business, and moved his office to Providence. His new partner was his son-in-law, John W. Danielson. (Note: John Weaver Danielson was born March 30, 1833, in Danielson, Connecticut. He was employed as a clerk in Lockwood's Quinebaug Mills in neighboring Brooklyn. He married Sarah Deming Lockwood, his daughter, in 1858. He was appointed managing agent in 1860 when Lockwood moved to Lewiston. When Lockwood returned to Providence, Danielson followed to be his partner. After retiring from Lockwood, Greene & Company in 1889 he held several official positions in manufacturing companies. He died January 1, 1913 in Providence.)

Lockwood's first work in the South came in 1875, when he built the first mill of the Piedmont Manufacturing Company at Piedmont, South Carolina, which began operation in 1876. In 1877-78 he also built the Vaucluse Mill at Vaucluse.

In 1879 engineer Stephen Greene joined the firm. In 1882, Lockwood, Davidson and Greene established a new partnership. Lockwood, Greene & Company was formed March 1, 1882, with offices in Providence. They continued in practice together until Lockwood's death, which occurred January 16, 1884, in Providence.

== Personal life ==
In 1876 Lockwood was appointed one of the American judges of textiles at the Centennial Exposition in Philadelphia, and in 1878 he was elected president of the New England Cotton Manufacturers' Association, now the National Textile Association.

Lockwood was a Congregationalist, and originally was a member of the church in Rehoboth. As agent of S. & J. Slater at Slatersville, he may have encouraged the construction of the Slatersville Congregational Church, built in 1838 by the company. In later life he was a member of the Central Congregational Church of Providence. The present Chapel Hall was given in memory of Amos DeForest Lockwood and his wife, Sarah Fuller Lockwood by their children and grandchildren in 1892. He was twice president of the Rhode Island Congregational Club.

In 1835 Lockwood married Sarah Fuller Deming of Brighton, Massachusetts. They had four children.

== Projects ==
- Wauregan Mills, Plainfield, Connecticut (1853)
- Androscoggin Mills, Lewiston, Maine (1860–61)
- Lewiston Mills, Lewiston, Maine (1860)
- Hill Mill No. 4, Lewiston, Maine (1861)
- Bates Mill No. 3, Lewiston, Maine (1863)
- Continental Mill Housing, Lewiston, Maine (1866, NRHP 1979)
- Boston Manufacturing Company Mill No. 3, Waltham, Massachusetts (1873 and 1879–80)
- Lewiston Bleachery and Dye Works, Lewiston, Maine (1870)
- Lockwood Mills, Waterville, Maine (1874)
- Piedmont Manufacturing Company Mill No. 1, Piedmont, South Carolina (1875, NRHP 1978, burned 1983)
- Vaucluse Mill, Vaucluse, South Carolina (1877–78)
- Acadia Mill, Methuen, Massachusetts (1880–81)
- Charleston Cotton Mills, Charleston, South Carolina (1881–82, NRHP 1980)
- St. Croix Cotton Mill, St. Stephen, New Brunswick (1881–82, demolished 1972)
- Marysville Cotton Mill, Marysville, New Brunswick (1883–85)
- Newberry Cotton Mill, Newberry, South Carolina (1883–84)

== Gallery of projects ==
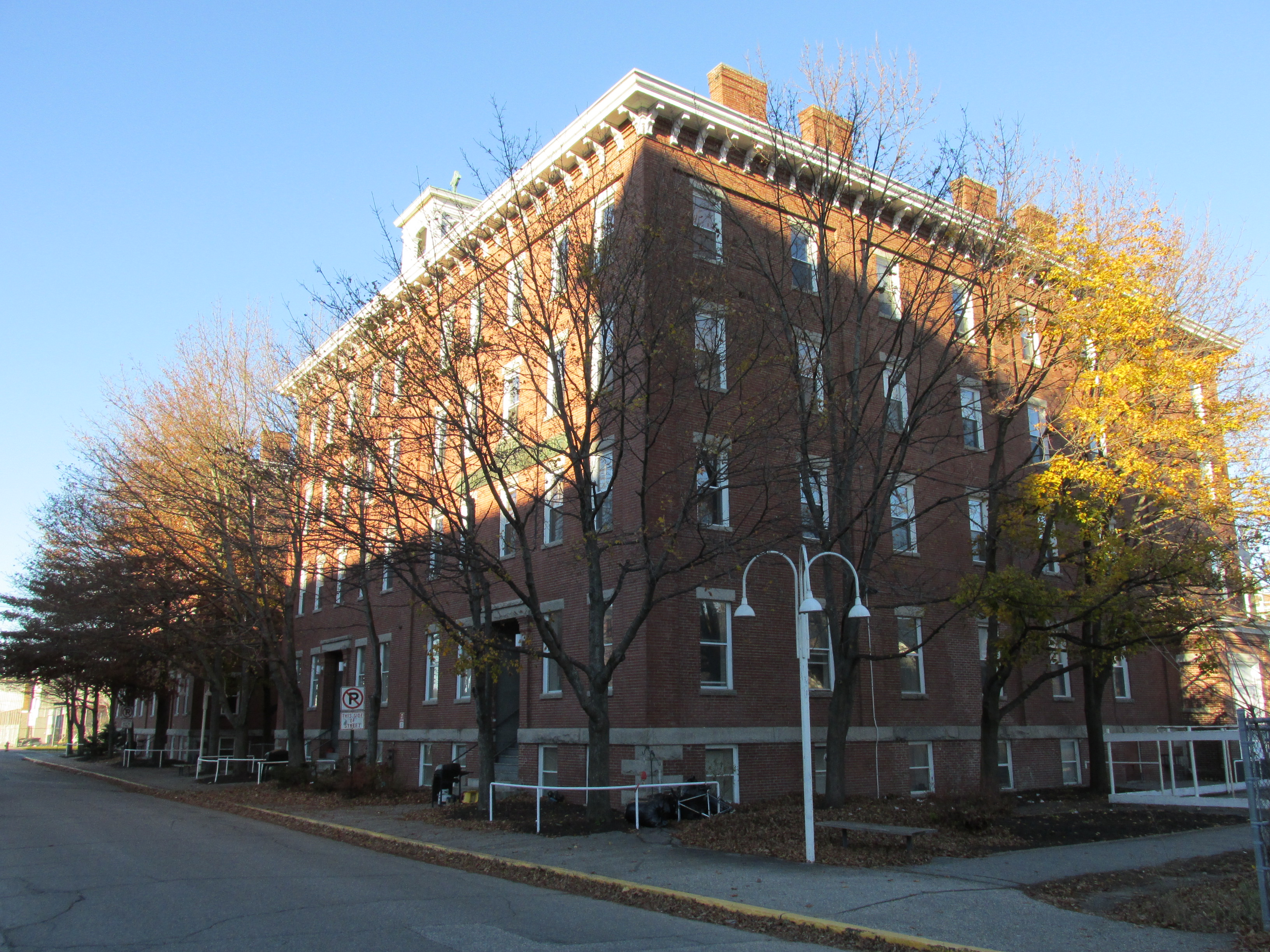
Continental Mill Housing, Lewiston, Maine, 1866

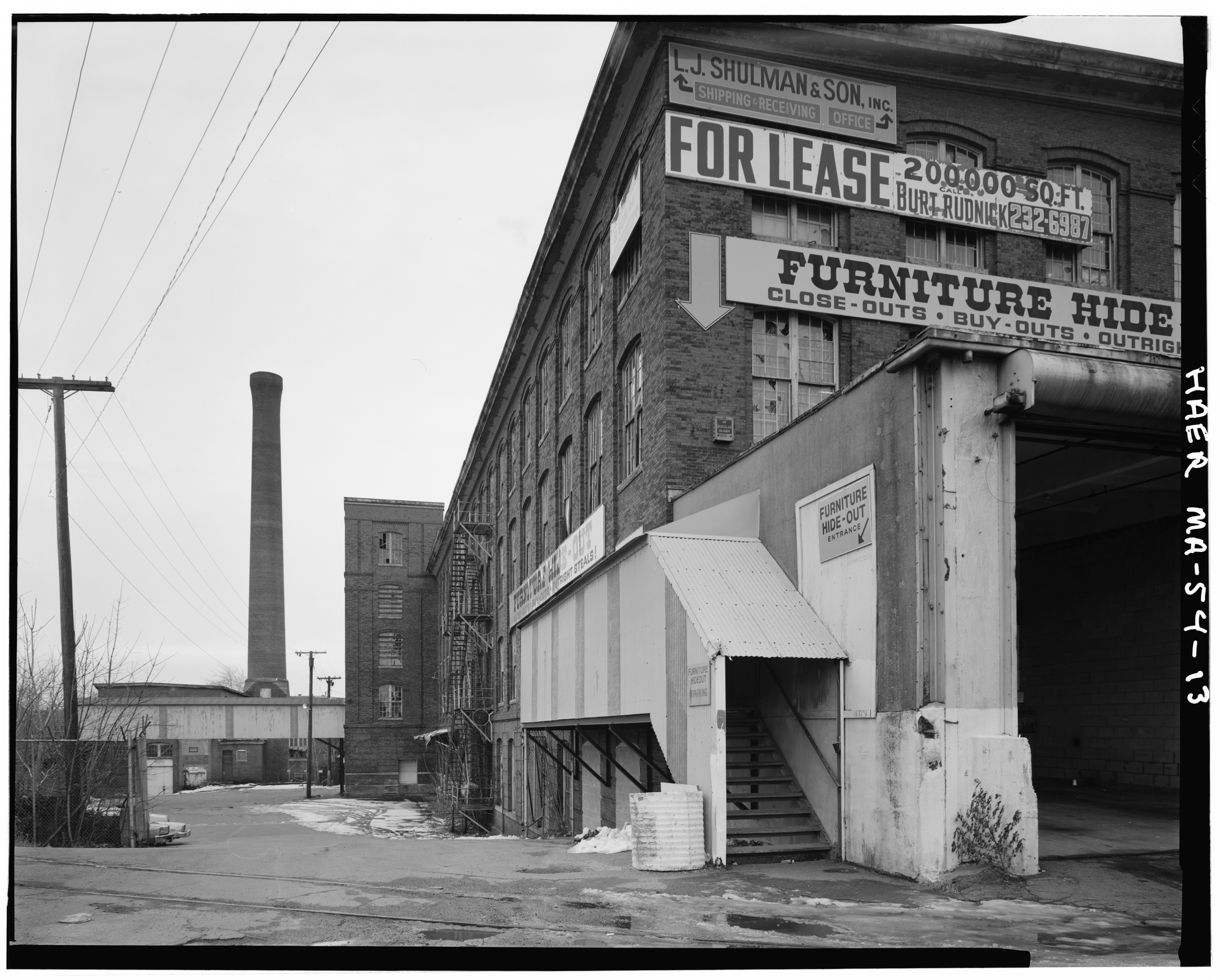
Boston Manufacturing Company Mill No. 3, Waltham, Massachusetts, 1873 and 1879-80

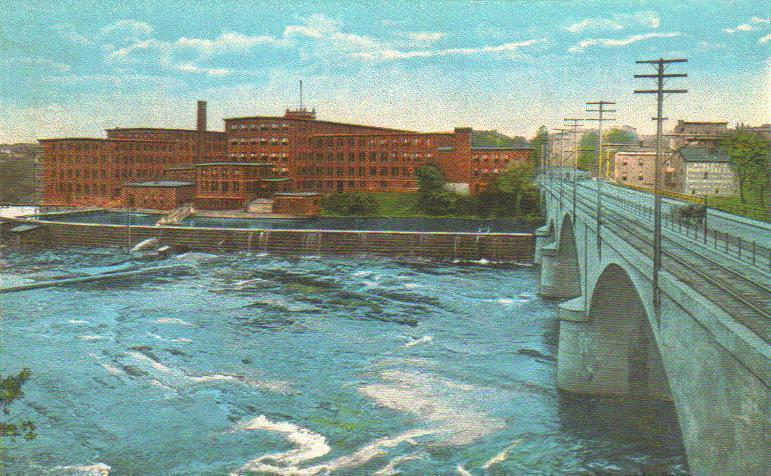
Lockwood Mills, Waterville, Maine, 1874

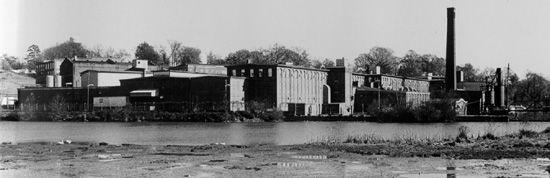
Piedmont Manufacturing Company Mill No. 1, Piedmont, South Carolina, 1875

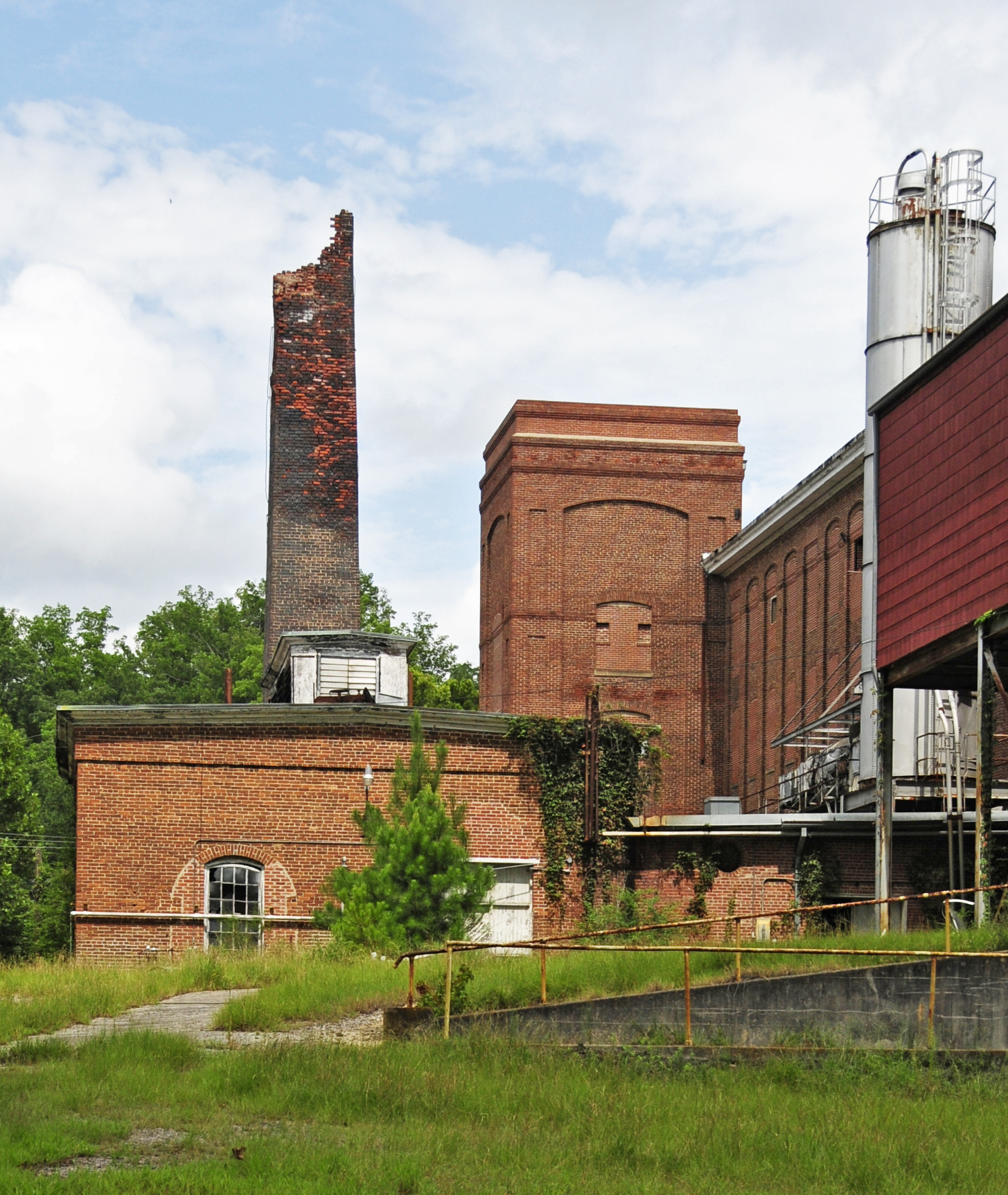
Vaucluse Mill, Vaucluse, South Carolina, 1877-78

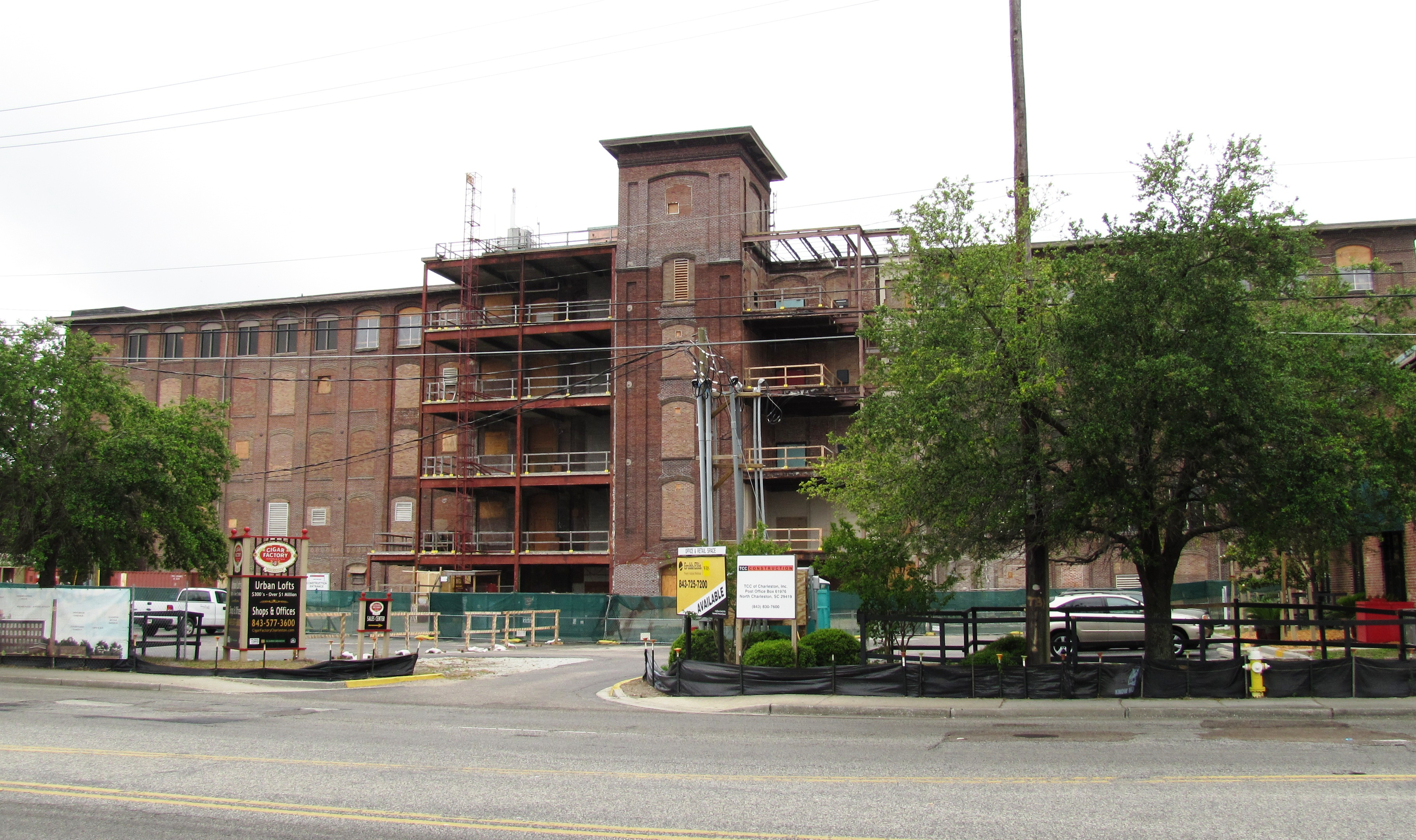
Charleston Cotton Mills, Charleston, South Carolina, 1881-82

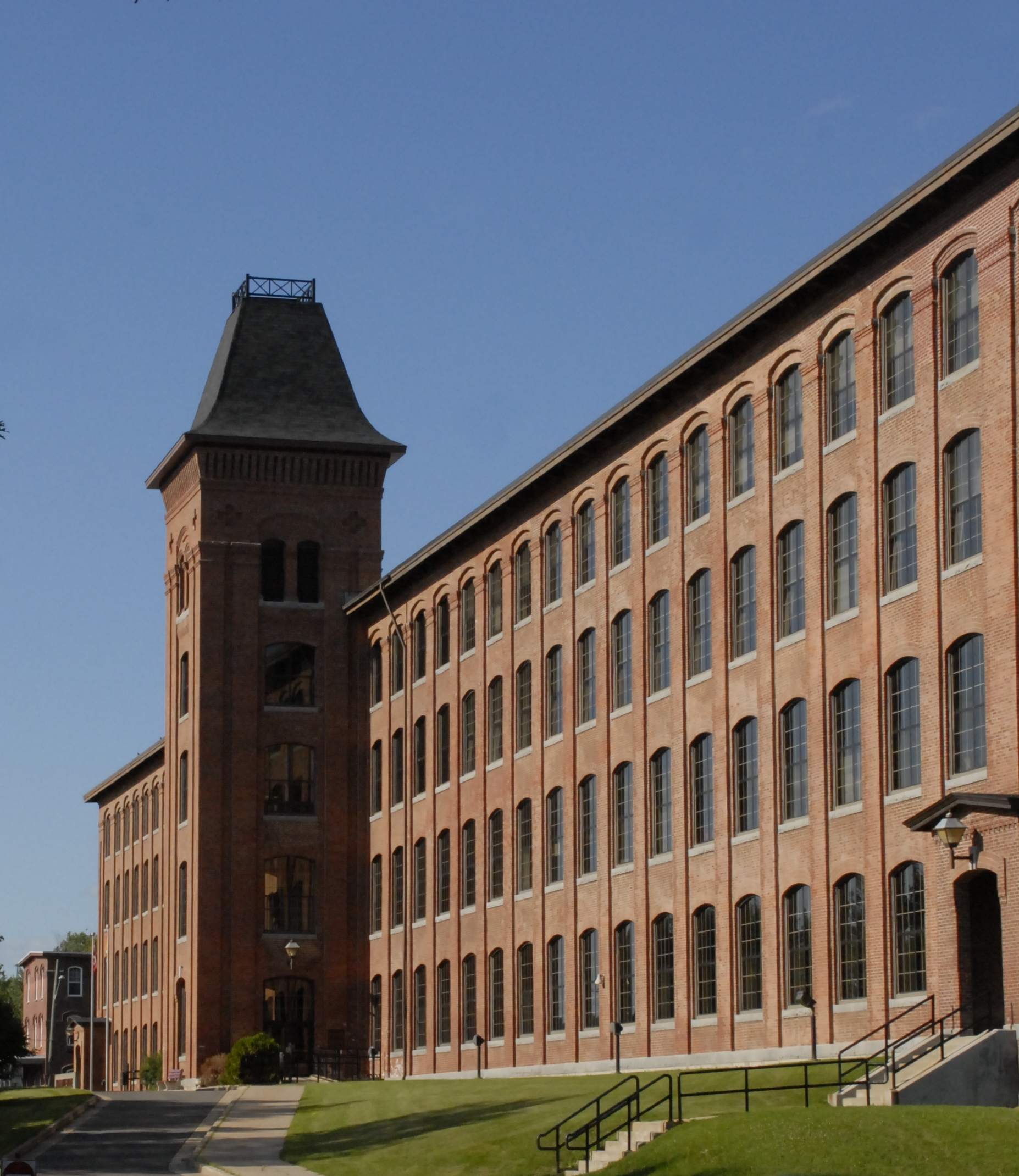
Marysville Cotton Mill, Marysville, New Brunswick, 1883-85
