= Cigar Factory =

- U.S. National Register of Historic Places
- U.S. National Historic Landmark
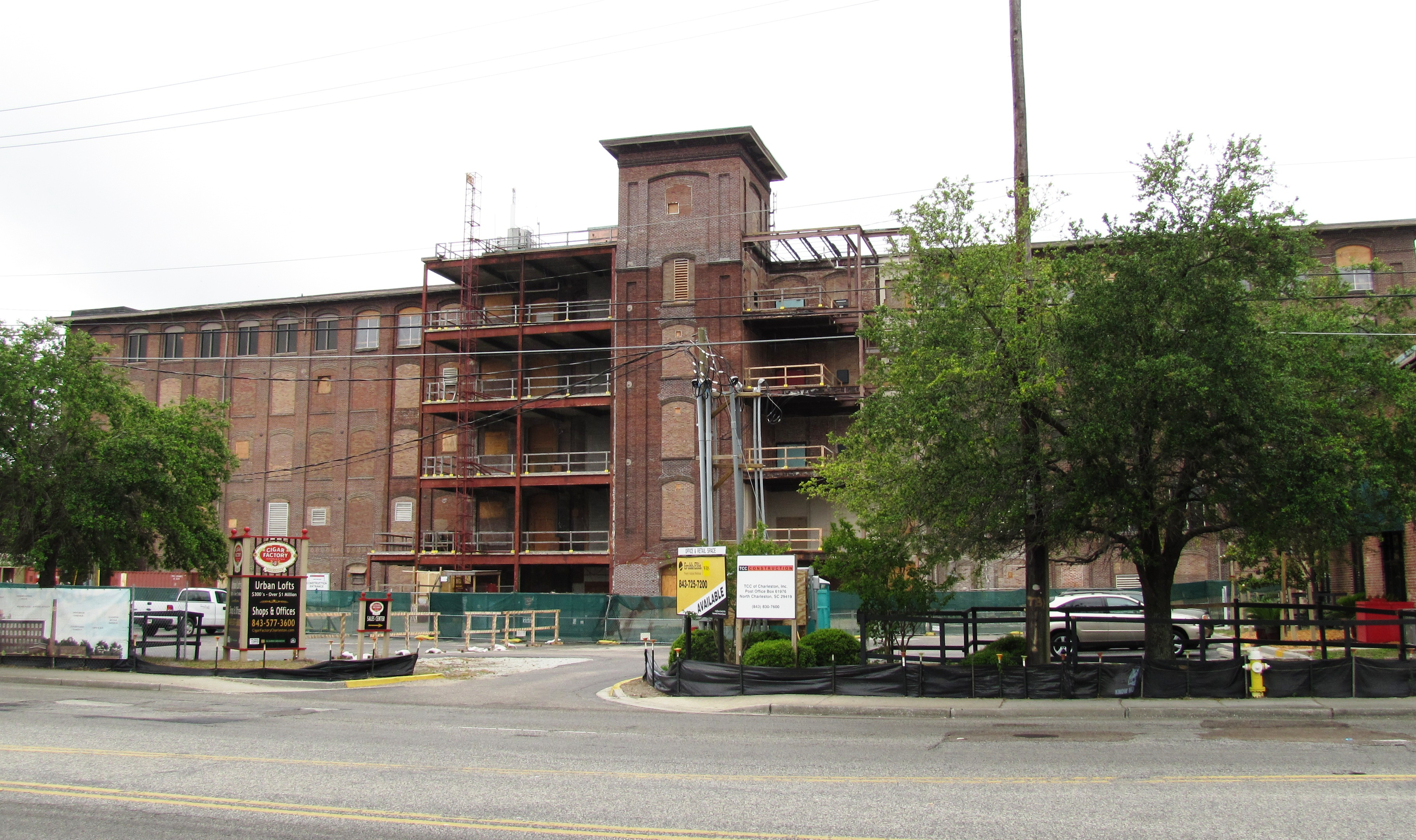
- Cigar Factory

- Location within South Carolina Location within the United States
- Location: 701 East Bay St., Charleston, South Carolina
- Coordinates: 32°47′51″N 79°56′5″W
- Built: 1882
- Architect: A. D. Lockwood & Company
- Architectural style: Victorian commercial
- NRHP reference No.: 80003658 (NRHP nomination); 100011360 (NHL designation)

Significant dates
- Added to NRHP: November 25, 1980
- Designated NHL: December 13, 2024

The Cigar Factory is a historic industrial building at 701 East Bay Street in Charleston, South Carolina. It was constructed in 1881 and opened in 1882 as the Cotton Mill of Charleston. In 1912, it was purchased by the American Cigar Company who converted it into a cigar factory that was the largest private employer in Charleston during the 1930s. In the 1940s, it was the location of the 1945–1946 Charleston Cigar Factory strike where the civil rights anthem "We Shall Overcome" emerged. The building was listed on the National Register of Historic Places in 1980, and was designated a National Historic Landmark in 2024.

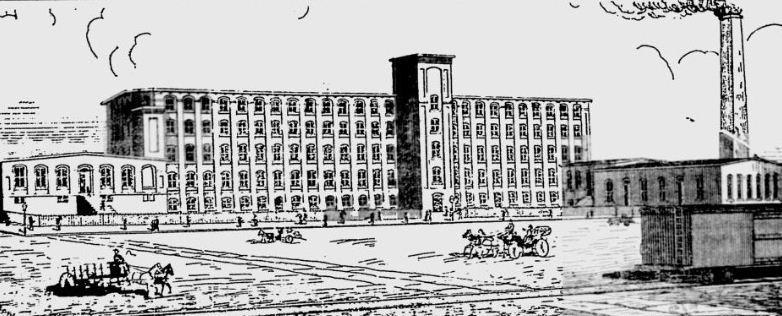
The Cotton Mill of Charleston opened in late 1882.

A $30 million redevelopment of the structure began in 2014. By 2017, the factory was mostly leased. Current businesses in the building include restaurants, salons, an event venue, and an ophthalmologist's office.
