= Piedmont Number One =

- Piedmont Manufacturing Company
- Formerly listed on the U.S. National Register of Historic Places
- Former U.S. National Historic Landmark
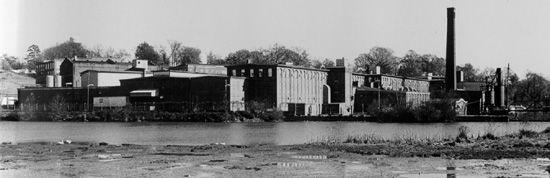
- Piedmont Number One is in the center of the photograph

- Location within South Carolina Location within the United States
- Location: S end of Main St., Piedmont, South Carolina
- Coordinates: 34.7030°N 82.4620°W
- Built: 1876
- Engineer: A. D. Lockwood & Company
- Demolished: 1983
- NRHP reference No.: 78002516

Significant dates
- Added to NRHP: June 2, 1978
- Removed from NRHP: March 5, 1986
- Delisted NHL: March 5, 1986

Piedmont Number One is a former textile plant and former National Historic Landmark in Piedmont, Greenville County, South Carolina. It burned in 1983.

== Piedmont Manufacturing Company ==
The Piedmont Manufacturing Company was established by Henry Pinckney Hammett in 1873. Over the next few years, it constructed a textile mill and village at Garrison Shoals on the Saluda River at the present location of Piedmont. Piedmont Number One, which opened in 1876, was a four-story brick factory with an L-shaped floor plan. Powered by a water wheel, it had 5,000 spindles and 112 looms. The building was designed by A. D. Lockwood & Company, consulting engineers of Providence, Rhode Island. Piedmont Number One was enlarged in 1880 and again in 1900. In 1888, Piedmont Number Two, was built on the west bank of the Saluda River in Anderson County. In 1892, the mills operated 47,000 spindles and 1,300 looms.

Because the mill was built where the water power was available, the Piedmont mill village was constructed for its employees. The village included houses for its employees, schools, churches, and other buildings. The village houses and stores were sold to private owners in the 1950s. By 1977, Piedmont Number One was no longer manufacturing textiles.

In recognition of its role in the Southern textile industry, Piedmont Number One was designated a National Historic Landmark on June 2, 1978. Because of significant modifications to its building, Piedmont Number Two was not also designated.

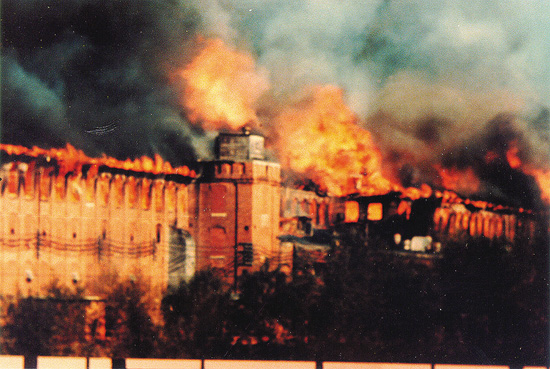
Piedmont Number One burning in October 1983

A fire in October 1983 destroyed much of Piedmont Number One. The ruins were demolished. Its National Historic Landmark and National Register of Historic Places designations were deleted on March 5, 1986.

== Photographs ==
Photographs of the mill, village, and community can be viewed in the Greenville County Library System digital collections.
