= Louise Shropshire =

American hymnist (1913–1993)

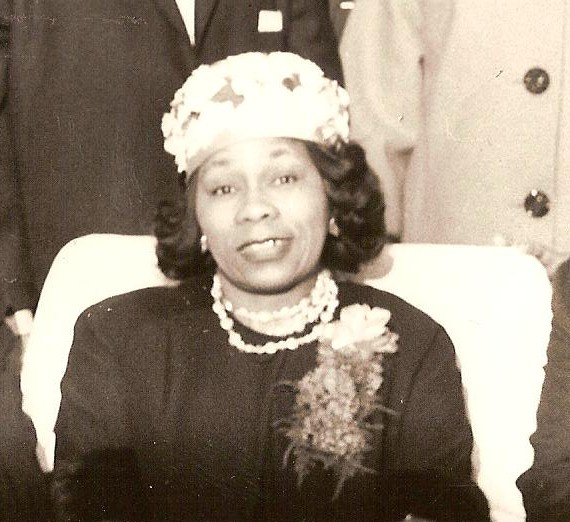
- Louise Shropshire, circa 1962
- Born: Louise Jarrett; February 15, 1913; Coffee County, Alabama, U.S.
- Died: November 26, 1993 (aged 80)
- Occupation: Composer of hymns
- Spouse(s): Robert Shropshire Sr. (m. 19??; died 1967)

Louise Shropshire (February 15, 1913 – November 26, 1993) was an American composer of hymns.

== Early life ==
The granddaughter of slaves, Louise Shropshire was born Louise Jarrett on February 15, 1913, in Coffee County, Alabama. In 1917, her family relocated to Cincinnati, Ohio in search of a better life than they had experienced as rural Alabama sharecroppers. As a young girl, Louise demonstrated a gift for music and composed many hymns as a member of the African American Baptist Church. Sometime between 1932 and 1942, she composed a gospel hymn entitled "If My Jesus Wills". It wasn't long until her music and talents were discovered.

== Singer and hymnwriter ==
In 1935, she was discovered by Rev. Thomas A. Dorsey at the National Convention of Gospel Choirs and Choruses (NCGCC), an organization founded by Dorsey, which was held in Cincinnati that year. Dorsey, who is still considered the father of gospel music, was impressed by Louise's talent as a composer and choir director and asked her to direct the mass choir segment of his convention. He also asked Shropshire to perform at the NCGCC with her family singing group, The Humble Three. Rev. Dorsey and Louise Shropshire would build a thirty-year friendship and together, co-wrote and copyrighted the gospel hymn, "Behold the Man of Galilee'". Some of Shropshire's other Gospel copyrighted compositions are "I've Got The Big Seal Of Approval"; "I'm Tryin' My Best To Get Home To See Jesus", "Whom Do Men Say That I Am?", "I Know Jesus Pilots Me". '"Are You Worthy to Take Communion", '"Come on, Jesus Will Save You Right Now", and "Mother's Beautiful Hands".

== Life and work ==
In the early 1950s, Louise Shropshire met Rev. Dr. Martin Luther King Jr. and Rev. Fred Shuttlesworth. Finding much in common; Shropshire and King became good friends and established a strong and loyal spiritual alliance. Dr. King grew very comfortable with the Shropshire family and lodged at the Shropshire home when in Cincinnati. In addition, with the financial support of her husband's successful bail bonds business, Shropshire held many fundraising events in her home and in Cincinnati hotels, several of which were attended by Dr. King himself. Funds were raised at these events to help bail out Civil Rights activists, who had been incarcerated during the Birmingham Campaign and Montgomery bus boycott. As a close friend of Rev. Fred Shuttlesworth and devout member of the African American Baptist Church, Louise Shropshire was instrumental in helping to establish the Greater New Light Baptist Church (GNLBC) in Cincinnati, Ohio.

Following the unexpected death of her husband, Robert "Bob" Shropshire Sr. in 1967, Louise Shropshire moved to California to be with her convalescing mother, Ollie Johnson Jarrett. Soon afterwards, using her own financial resources, she planted a sister church in Pomona, California, to the GNLBC in Cincinnati. Both churches remain active to this day.

Louise Shropshire died on November 26, 1993. The last words she spoke were to her grandson, Robert Anthony Goins Shropshire: "Someday, somebody’s gonna do something with all my music". In the years before her death, Louise Shropshire had taken more than 50 foster children into her home and was known never to deny a brother in need. Having exhausted her financial resources in the course of helping others, Louise Shropshire died penniless.

In his 2012 book We Shall Overcome: Sacred Song on the Devil's Tongue, music producer Isaias Gamboa presented a theory suggesting that Shropshire's hymn "If My Jesus Wills" was the basis for the iconic protest song "We Shall Overcome", contrasting a more popular theory that linked the song to a hymn by Rev. Dr. Charles Albert Tindley, "I'll Overcome Some Day".

In 2013, Shropshire was inducted into the Ohio Civil Rights Hall of Fame.
