= 1945–1946 Charleston Cigar Factory strike =

Labor dispute in South Carolina, US

- Date: October 22, 1945 – April 1, 1946 (5 months, 1 week and 3 days)
- Location: Charleston, South Carolina, United States
- Caused by: Company refusing to issue unpaid wages or institute pay raises; racial discrimination
- Goals: A closed shop; Protections against racial discrimination; Pay raise of 25 cents per hour
- Methods: Boycott; Picketing; Strike action; Walkout
- Result: Workers received backpay, a pay raise of 8 cents per hour, and agreements to ease the racial barriers to skilled positions

Parties
FTA-CIO Local 15	American Tobacco Company

The 1945–1946 Charleston Cigar Factory strike was a labor strike involving workers at the Cigar Factory in Charleston, South Carolina, United States. The strike commenced on October 22, 1945, and ended on April 1 of the following year, with the strikers winning some concessions from the company.

The strike took place at the Cigar Factory, a production facility owned by the American Tobacco Company (ATC). The company had been operating the plant since 1903 as a racially segregated workplace, with white and African Americans working in different positions and for different pay. During World War II, workers at the plant unionized under the Food, Tobacco, Agricultural, and Allied Workers (FTA) of the Congress of Industrial Organizations, becoming FTA-CIO Local 15. The union agreed to not conduct any strike action for the duration of the conflict, and in turn the company agreed to institute pay raises after the war was over. By that time, the factory was employing about 1,400 employees, a majority African American. However, after the war's end in September 1945, the company reneged on its agreement and refused to negotiate with the union. Additionally, the company was slow in issuing backpay to workers that they had earned during the war. This, coupled with the firing of an African American worker in a move viewed by many employees as racially charged, led to a series of sitdown strikes and walkouts. Finally, on October 22, workers at the Cigar Factory went on strike. They were joined by FTA workers at other ATC plants in Philadelphia, Pennsylvania, and Trenton, New Jersey, who went on solidarity strikes with the Charleston workers, and the national union instituted a boycott against ATC products. In addition to demands regarding pay and protections against racial discrimination, the strikers also pushed for the Cigar Factory to become a closed shop.

While a majority of the people on strike were black women, maintaining solidarity along different racial lines was seen as crucial to winning the strike, and the local union began to hold integrated meetings, something they had not previously done. Additionally, the strikers were able to garner support from a wide array of sources in Charleston, including among African American activists and white progressives. This support proved essential for continuing the strike into the winter months. Despite a ruling by the National Labor Relations Board that mandated the company to issue backpay on November 8, the union decided to remain on strike until all of their demands were met. As a result, the strike continued until March of the following year when the company finally agreed to some concessions, including an 8 cent per hour raise and agreements to ease the racial barriers that barred many African Americans from higher-paying positions in the company. By this point, the number of strikers, which had been around 1,000 at the beginning of the strike, had diminished significantly, and the union quickly accepted the deal, with the strike ending on April 1.

The strike is noted by historians as one of the few examples of a united biracial coalition in the Southern United States at the time, with the Preservation Society of Charleston stating that "the Cigar Factory strike was revolutionary in its illustration of the power of a unified voice". However, this coalition would not be sustained in the following years, as anticommunist and segregationist sentiments eroded support for Local 15 among many of the white workers, who organized their own local union. By the 1960s, due to changes in the tobacco industry, the plant experienced massive layoffs. It was closed permanently in 1973. The strike is also notable as the place where the modern version of the gospel hymn and civil rights anthem "We Shall Overcome" was first performed.

== Background ==
=== The Cigar Factory ===
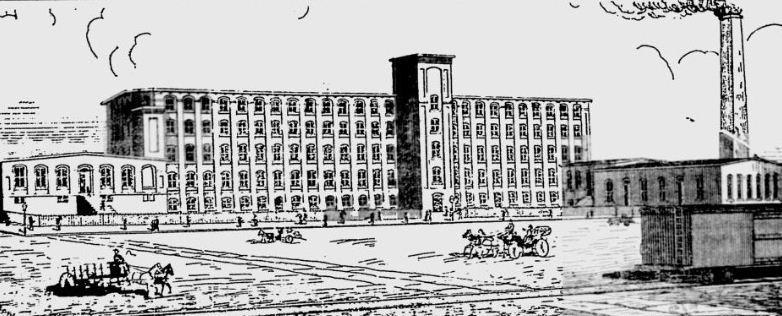
An 1882 illustration of the cotton mill

During the late 1800s, influential business leaders and boosters in Charleston, South Carolina, sought to encourage increased industrial development in the city. At the time, Charleston was the economic center of the state, but was not developing as rapidly as some other major cities in the Southern United States, and much of the state's textile industry was based in Upstate South Carolina. In 1882, as part of this push for industry in South Carolina, the Charleston Manufacturing Company began operations at a newly built cotton mill in the city's Hampstead neighborhood, which would eventually become known as the Charleston Cotton Mills. This five-story building, which was constructed in the Victorian style, occupied an entire city block at the intersection of East Bay Street and Columbus Street, several blocks away from Emanuel African Methodist Episcopal Church and overlooking the Cooper River. When it first opened, the plant only hired African Americans in custodial positions, while textile jobs were performed by local white Americans under the supervision of experienced workers from cotton mills in the Northern United States. However, in 1897, due to poor business, the plant began to accept African American workers to certain positions that had previously been off-limits. The plant closed shortly thereafter, and an effort to revive the plant two years later with a workforce that included black women from the nearby Sea Islands also failed.

The plant remained dormant for several years until the property was leased to the American Tobacco Company (ATC), which converted the plant from a cotton mill to a cigar factory. By 1912, the company purchased the plant outright, and it would eventually become known locally simply as the Cigar Factory. Like the cotton mill before it, this plant hired both black and white people, with black workers performing separate tasks from the white workers, such as creating cigar boxes or processing tobacco leaves. By the 1930s, the plant employed about 1,400 people, of whom 60 percent were women, and had an annual payroll of approximately $1 million. At its peak of production, the plant was creating 1.5 million cigars per day. The plant attracted many African American workers as it offered some of the highest wages available to them in the city, though they had to contend with both the physically demanding nature of the work and constant racial discrimination from management.

=== FTA-CIO Local 15 ===
In the 1940s, during World War II, workers at the plant organized under a local union of the United Cannery, Agricultural, Packing, and Allied Workers of America (UCAPAWA), a labor union affiliated with the Congress of Industrial Organizations (CIO). The UCAPAWA changed its name shortly after the Charleston workers organized with it, becoming the Food, Tobacco, Agricultural, and Allied Workers (FTA), with the local union at the Cigar Factory becoming FTA-CIO Local 15. On September 1, 1944, they voted to approve their first union contract, and leaders of Local 15 began to negotiate with ATC management. The union agreed to abide by a guideline set by the National War Labor Board (NWLB) that barred the union from engaging in any strike action, and while the company did not institute immediate pay raises, they did agree to raise workers' pay after the war was over. Under the terms of the agreement, black workers would receive a pay raise from 25 cents per hour to 40 cents per hour, while white workers who were machinists and supervisors would be paid 65 cents per hour. (Note: These figures are given in a 2014 online report about the strike published by the College of Charleston's Lowcountry Digital History Initiative. However, a 2013 article published by NPR states that workers were making 45 cents per hour at the time of the strike.)

During the war, despite an excess profits tax, the ATC experienced significant growth and record profits, with their workforce at the Cigar Factory expanding to almost 2,000 employees. Additionally, following the war's conclusion in 1945, the company received roughly $1.3 million in refunds from the excess profits tax. With World War II over, the Cigar Factory employed about 1,400 workers, of whom about 900 were black women, and roughly 1,000 were Local 15 members. On September 24, 1945, Local 15 members voted to approve a new contract that called for increased wages and backpay that had been guaranteed during the war. The following month, the NWLB also ordered ATC to pay their workers some wages that had been withheld by the company from December 1944 to October 1945. However, company executives ignored the order and Harold F. McGinnis, the manager of the Cigar Factory, also refused to honor the local union's contract. On October 1, McGinnis fired a black male employee after his white female supervisor accused him of "taking familiarities" with some of the female employees in the plant, a move that many Local 15 members saw as racially charged. With the firing and the failure to honor their contract, tensions increased dramatically between the company and the union, and on October 3, Local 15 president Reuel Stanfield organized a sitdown strike. Over the next two days, about one hundred workers participated, remaining idle by their workstations to protest the company, and on October 4, about 900 African American employees performed a walkout after the fired employee was not given his job back. In light of these events, on October 5, McGinnis met with Stanfield to discuss the workers' grievances. However, during the meeting, McGinnis offered no firm plans on how to handle their grievances, and following the meeting, the company's process for issuing backpay was slow. This was not an issue that was unique to the Cigar Factory, as workers at other ATC plants in Philadelphia, Pennsylvania, and Trenton, New Jersey, also voiced their displeasure at backpay issues and discrimination. As a result of this, the FTA decided to initiate a solidarity strike at all three of these ATC plants, and on October 15, workers at the Philadelphia plant became the first to go on strike. Workers at the Charleston plant would go on strike as well one week later, on October 22.

== Course of the strike ==
The October 22 strike action at the Cigar Factory involved a walkout of about 1,000 workers, a majority of whom were black women. The workers' demands included a 25 cent per hour raise, the issuance of backpay, and a closed shop model for the plant that would have required new hires to join the union. Picket lines were established outside of the factory, with strikers carrying placards that stated their demands and singing spirituals. During these pickets, the strikers faced harassment from police officers and segregationists, and on several occasions there were physical confrontations between the strikers and strikebreakers that the company had brought in to keep the plant operating. Additionally, the union launched a boycott against ATC products. On October 25, several days after the Charleston workers went on strike, workers at the ATC plant in Trenton also joined the Philadelphia and Charleston workers in a solidarity strike. The following day, on October 26, Local 15 held its first integrated meeting at the Morris Street Baptist Church. Prior to this, the local had often held separate meetings for its black and white members, but strike leaders felt that maintaining solidarity among the union members was crucial to winning their demands.

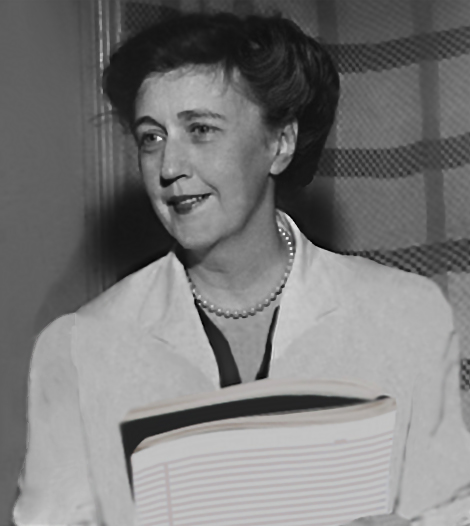
Civil rights activist Virginia Foster Durr helped to organize support for the strikers.

Because of ATC's refusal to issue backpay in spite of orders from the federal government, the union filed a complaint with the National Labor Relations Board (NLRB), who sent a representative of theirs to Charleston on November 8 to investigate the matter. That same day, Stanfield was attacked by four individuals while at the union's offices, and while the NLRB representative and others positively identified the four assailants to police officers who arrested them, the police declined to file charges against the men and released them. Ultimately, the NLRB ruled in favor of the union and ordered the company to pay workers at the Charleston plant $120,000 in backpay that was owed to them. Several days later, on November 15, a group of about 1,000 strikers gathered at the plant in a massive demonstration, following which ATC agreed to issue the backpay. Despite rumors that this would bring an end to the strike, the FTA decided to keep the strike ongoing at the three ATC plants until all of the workers' grievances were addressed. As a result, the strike continued past the fall and into winter, during which time Charleston experienced unusually extreme weather phenomena, including freezing rain and snow. However, the strike persisted thanks in large part to support from many local activists and organizations. Labor and civil rights activists Karl and Frances Rogers Korstad, who had had experience in organized labor in the tobacco industry, traveled to Charleston early on in the strike and used their connections to get the Southern Conference for Human Welfare (SCHW) to lend financial and vocal support for the strike. SCHW co-founders Virginia Foster Durr and Clark Foreman helped to establish the Emergency Committee to Aid Families of American Tobacco Company Strikers, and a permanent local chapter of the SCHW was founded in Charleston. Ultimately, these efforts were able to attract a large base of support for the strike among both black civil rights activists and white middle class progressives.

For much of the strike, McGinnis and management at the Cigar Factory refused to meet with union leaders or negotiate, and as a result the strike continued for several months. However, by March 1946, the company was willing to negotiate an end to the labor dispute, as the strike and boycott had hurt the company's public image and there were concerns that the NLRB would become involved. As a result, in the last week of March, the company agreed to certain concessions that were readily accepted by the union. These concessions included a pay raise of 8 cents per hour and an agreement to ease racial barriers to certain skilled positions within the factory. (Note: Both the Preservation Society of Charleston and a 2014 project published by the College of Charleston's Lowcountry Digital History Initiative state that the strikers received an 8 cents per hour raise. However, a 2016 book by historians Herb Frazier, Bernard Edward Powers Jr., and Marjory Wentworth gives the raise as 15 cents per hour.) By this point, there were few strikers left actively picketing the factory, and while the concessions fell short of the workers' initial demands, they returned to work on April 1, bringing an end to the strike.

== Aftermath ==
=== Fate of the Cigar Factory ===
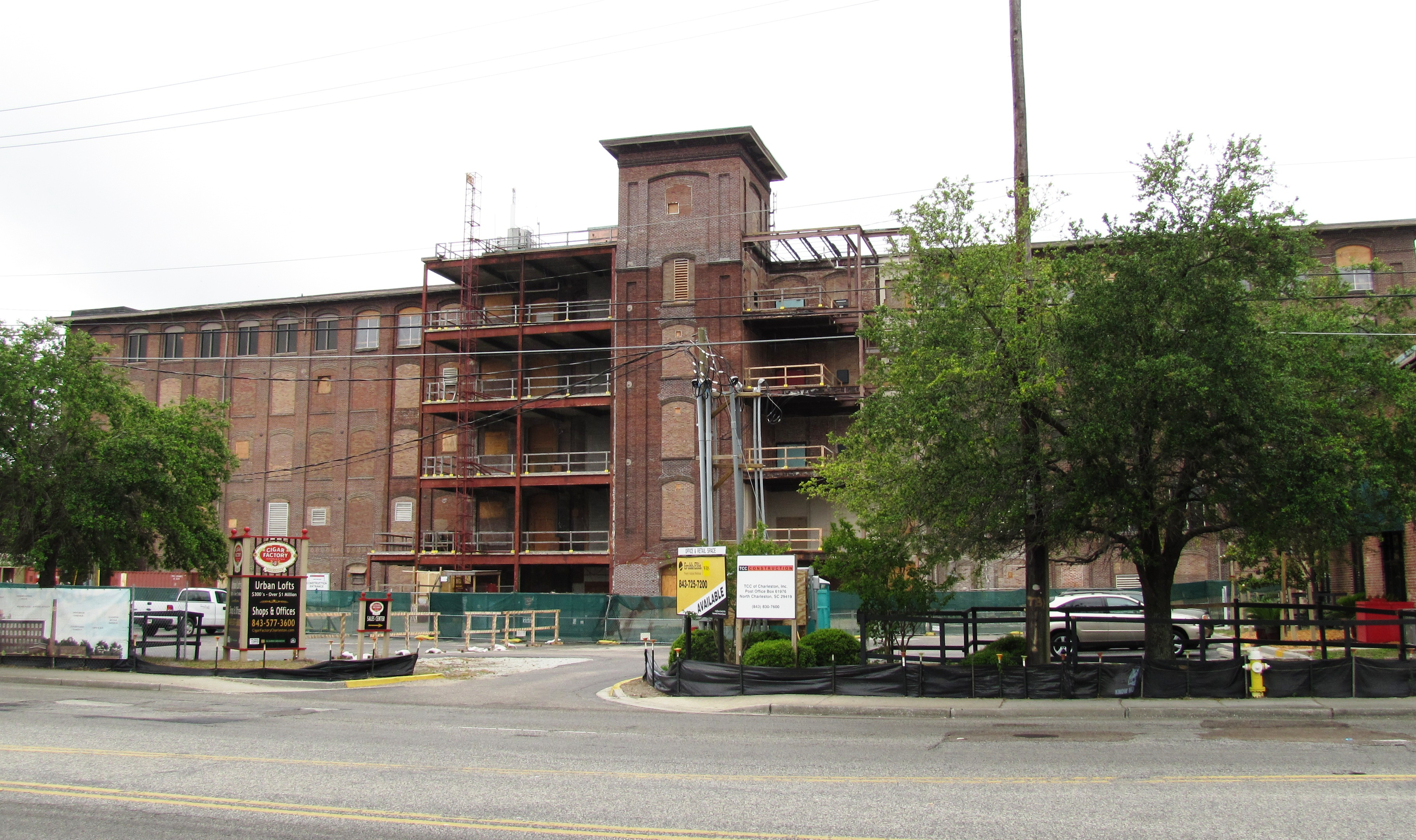
The Cigar Factory in 2010

The passage of the Taft–Hartley Act in 1947 severely hurt the FTA, which had several ties to communist organizations and individuals, and as a result, Local 15 became associated instead with the Distributive, Processing, and Office Workers of America (DPO) of the CIO. Around this same time, many white workers at the factory abandoned DPO Local 15 and joined the white-only Tobacco Workers International Union (TWIU) Local 257, which competed with Local 15 for influence at the plant. By the mid-1950s, Local 257, which was considered a company union, had become a serious threat to Local 15's influence. Additionally, by the 1960s, the factory was experiencing the negative effects of changes in the tobacco industry related to increased competition from foreign companies and a requirement from the federal government to add tobacco packaging warning messages to their products. As a result, in 1966, the Cigar Factory laid off 900 workers, and in 1973, the factory closed permanently, having operated continuously for about 70 years. In 1980, Johnson & Wales University began using the facility as for classroom space, and that same year, the building was added to the National Register of Historic Places. In 2013, a historical marker was added outside the building that gave information on the strike, and the following year, the property was purchased by a private company that converted it into a mixed-use development. In 2016, the cigar factory and the strike were the subject of a historical fiction novel written by Michele Moore and published by Story River Books.

=== Historical significance ===
Some historians note that the strike was significant in bringing together black and white individuals towards a common goal, a rarity in the Southern United States at the time. In an article on the strike, the Preservation Society of Charleston stated that, "In the 1940s south, the Cigar Factory strike was revolutionary in its illustration of the power of a unified voice". A 2016 book by historians Herb Frazier, Bernard Edward Powers Jr., and Marjory Wentworth echoes these same sentiments, stating that the strike was "far ahead of its time" for uniting black and white economic interests. Many of the individuals who were involved in the strike would later be active in the civil rights movement that would begin several years after the strike ended, and in Charleston during this time there was a surge in political activity among African Americans, such as with the formation of the Progressive Democratic Party. Other sources view the strike as part of a long history of organized labor activity among African Americans in Charleston, including activities among organized longshoremen and the 1969 Charleston hospital strike, the latter of which drawing inspiration from the Cigar Factory strike. However, the strike would prove to be one of the last major biracial movements in the city. According to Frazier, Powers, and Wentworth, "The divisions between working-class Southerners of both races increased under the pressures of anticommunist and anti-integration rhetoric that was soon to come".

==== "We Shall Overcome" ====
The gospel song "We Shall Overcome" traces its origins back to the 1800s, when it was used as a work song sung by slaves in the United States, and in 1901 a version was published by the Methodist minister Charles Albert Tindley titled "I'll Overcome Someday". During the Cigar Factory strike, Lucille Simmons, a striker and longtime employee of the factory, would sing a modified version of this gospel song, which became known as "We Will Overcome", to signify the end of picketing for the day. According to a 2016 article in The Atlantic, Simmons's performances would be "[t]he first widely acknowledged performance of the modern song". In 1947, two members of Local 15, Anna Lee Bonneau and Evelyn Risher, traveled to the Highlander Folk School in Monteagle, Tennessee, to attend a workshop. There, they introduced the song to civil rights activist Zilphia Horton, who sang it for activist and folk singer Pete Seeger later that year. Seeger is generally regarded as popularizing the song, with the name "We Shall Overcome", which became a major anthem in the civil rights movement. The 2013 historical marker at the Cigar Factory gives information regarding the singing of the song during the strike.

== See also ==
- US Strike wave of 1945–1946

== Sources ==
- Adams, Noah (August 28, 2013). "The Inspiring Force Of 'We Shall Overcome'". NPR. Archived from the original on August 8, 2022.
- Evans, Anna (February 2016). "Factory Connection". Charleston Magazine. Archived from the original on January 18, 2023.
- Frazier, Herb; Powers, Bernard Edward Jr.; Wentworth, Marjory (2016). We Are Charleston: Tragedy and Triumph at Mother Emanuel. Nashville, Tennessee: W Publishing Group. ISBN 978-0-7180-4149-6.
- Graham, David A. (April 14, 2016). "Who Owns 'We Shall Overcome'?". The Atlantic. Archived from the original on October 6, 2022.
- Greene, Harlan (October 2015). "Overcoming at the Cigar Factory". Charleston Magazine. Archived from the original on June 29, 2022.
- Greene, Robert II (September 21, 2022). "A Nation Within a Nation". The Nation. ISSN 0027-8378. Archived from the original on October 4, 2022.
- "Cigar Factory Strike". Preservation Society of Charleston. Archived from the original on May 17, 2022.
- Ricke, Temple (March 25, 2020). "Way Back Wednesday: The Cigar Factory". WCBD-TV. Archived from the original on December 2, 2022.
- Waugh, Dwana (May 2014). "Charleston's Cigar Factory Strike, 1945-1946". Lowcountry Digital History Initiative. College of Charleston. Archived from the original on November 11, 2022.
