= We Shall Overcome: Sacred Song on the Devil's Tongue =

Non-fiction book

We Shall Overcome: Sacred Song On The Devil's Tongue
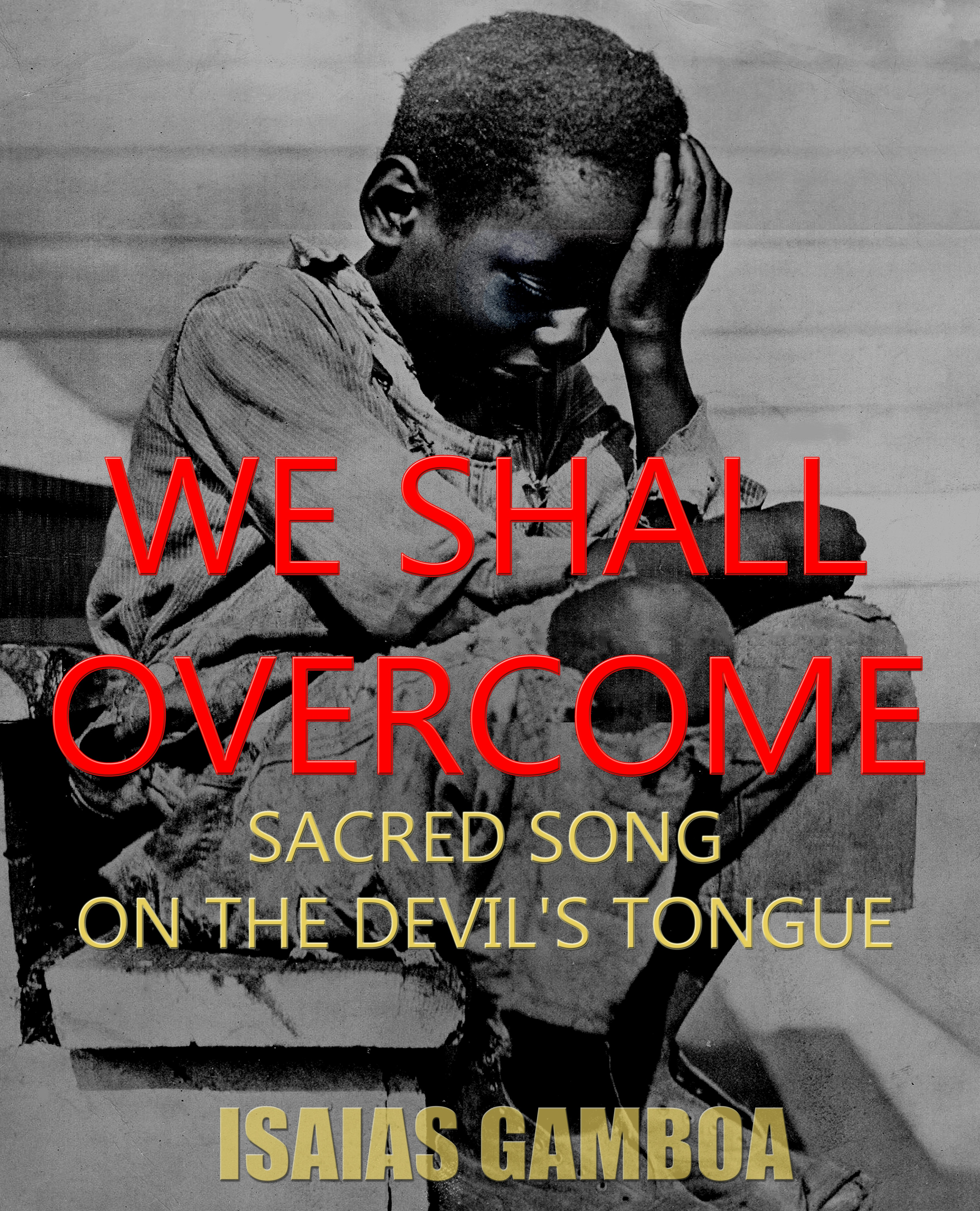
- Author: Isaias Gamboa
- Language: English
- Subject: We Shall Overcome, Louise Shropshire, Gospel music, Copyright law of the United States, Civil Rights Movement, African-American culture, Slavery in the United States, Folk Music, Martin Luther King Jr., Fred Shuttlesworth, Pete Seeger, Intellectual property infringement, Music industry, African-American music
- Genre: Non-fiction
- Published: 2012 Amapola Publishers
- Publication place: United States
- Media type: Print
- Pages: 298
- ISBN: 978-0-615475288
- LC Class: ML3918.P67 G36 2012

We Shall Overcome: Sacred Song on the Devil's Tongue is a book by, Isaias Gamboa, a music producer, songwriter and arranger.

The book discusses the history of the iconic freedom-song, "We Shall Overcome" and the biography of Louise Shropshire (1913-1993), who Gamboa asserts to be the "original author" of the song which became the anthem of the Civil Rights Movement. Louise Shropshire was a noted hymn-writer and close friend of the Reverend Dr. Martin Luther King Jr., Rev. Fred Shuttlesworth and Rev. Thomas A. Dorsey.

Among other things, the book reveals previously unpublished historical and musicological evidence of Louise Shropshire's role in the creation of, "We Shall Overcome". Gamboa's book shows the US copyright to "We Shall Overcome" to have been claimed by music publisher, The Richmond Organization, Inc. since 1960 with no attribution to its original author. The book links Shropshire's Gospel hymn, "If My Jesus Wills"—composed sometime between 1932 and 1942 and most commonly known as "I'll Overcome", to an substantially similar song known as, "We Will Overcome". According to the book, "We Will Overcome" was a clear adaptation of Shropshire's hymn, "If My Jesus Wills" by African American union workers in the late 1940s from which prima facie and other evidence indicates "We Shall Overcome" was derived.

The book concludes that the first and most important verse to We Shall Overcome; "We Shall Overcome, We Shall Overcome, We Shall Overcome Someday, Oh Deep In My Heart, I Do Believe, We Shall Overcome Someday", have never been legally owned by Pete Seeger or The Richmond Organization, Inc. and should reside in the public domain.

Featuring more than 100 photographs, Gamboa's book also contextually explores African American religious culture, the historical attitudes of Black-exploitation, subjugation and racism in America and the economic exploitation of African American cultural production by non culture-bearers.

Louise Shropshire's papers and artifacts were acquired in 2014 by the University of Cincinnati and are preserved in the Rare Books Archives.

According to The Journal of Blacks in Higher Education, the Shropshire collection includes photographs, family memorabilia, letters, sheet music and other documents. The collection is held in UC's Archives and Rare Books Library, located on the eighth floor of Blegen Library.
