= Isaias Gamboa (music producer) =

Afro-Costa Rican-American music producer

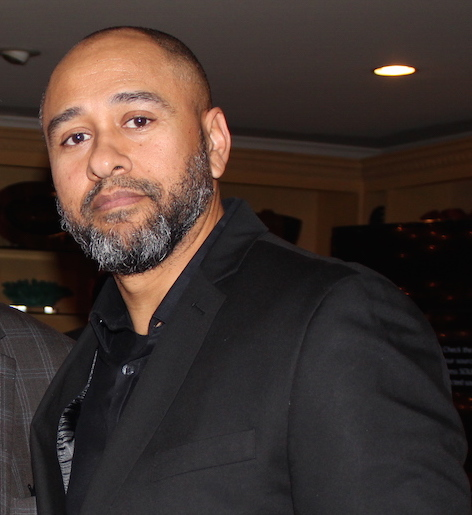
- Born: April 21, 1963 (age 63); San Jose, Costa Rica
- Notable work: We Shall Overcome: Sacred Song on the Devil's Tongue

Isaias Gamboa (born April 21, 1963) is an Afro-Costa Rican–American music producer, songwriter, musician, arranger, author and filmmaker. Gamboa is known for his lawsuit which revealed the origin of the protest song "We Shall Overcome". After years of research, Gamboa published the book We Shall Overcome: Sacred Song On The Devil's Tongue in 2012, which described how "We Shall Overcome" was based on a gospel song by Louise Shropshire rather than other gospel songs as suggested by Pete Seeger who had it copyrighted to protect it from abuse. Gamboa sued The Richmond Organization who claimed the rights to the song. In 2018, the court removed any copyright claims, and stated that the song was public domain.

Gamboa has written, performed, produced and/or arranged more than 200 songs for recording artists including, Shalamar, Gladys Knight & the Pips, Tavares, the Brothers Johnson, Dynasty, the Pointer Sisters, and five albums for the Temptations. In 1994 Gamboa produced the remix of "Pain" by Tupac Shakur for the film soundtrack Above the Rim.

Gamboa was also part of the short-lived band Real to Reel. They were discovered and mentored by Leon Sylvers III. Their debut album had production from Sylvers and Jimmy Jam and Terry Lewis. The project was shelved by Arista Records over creative and economic differences between Sylvers and Arista founder and president Clive Davis. Their self-titled album - which was originally scheduled for release in 1983 - was officially released by Legacy Recordings to digital and streaming platforms in January 2025.
