= Vaucluse Mill Village Historic District =

Historic district in South Carolina, United States

- U.S. National Register of Historic Places
- U.S. Historic district
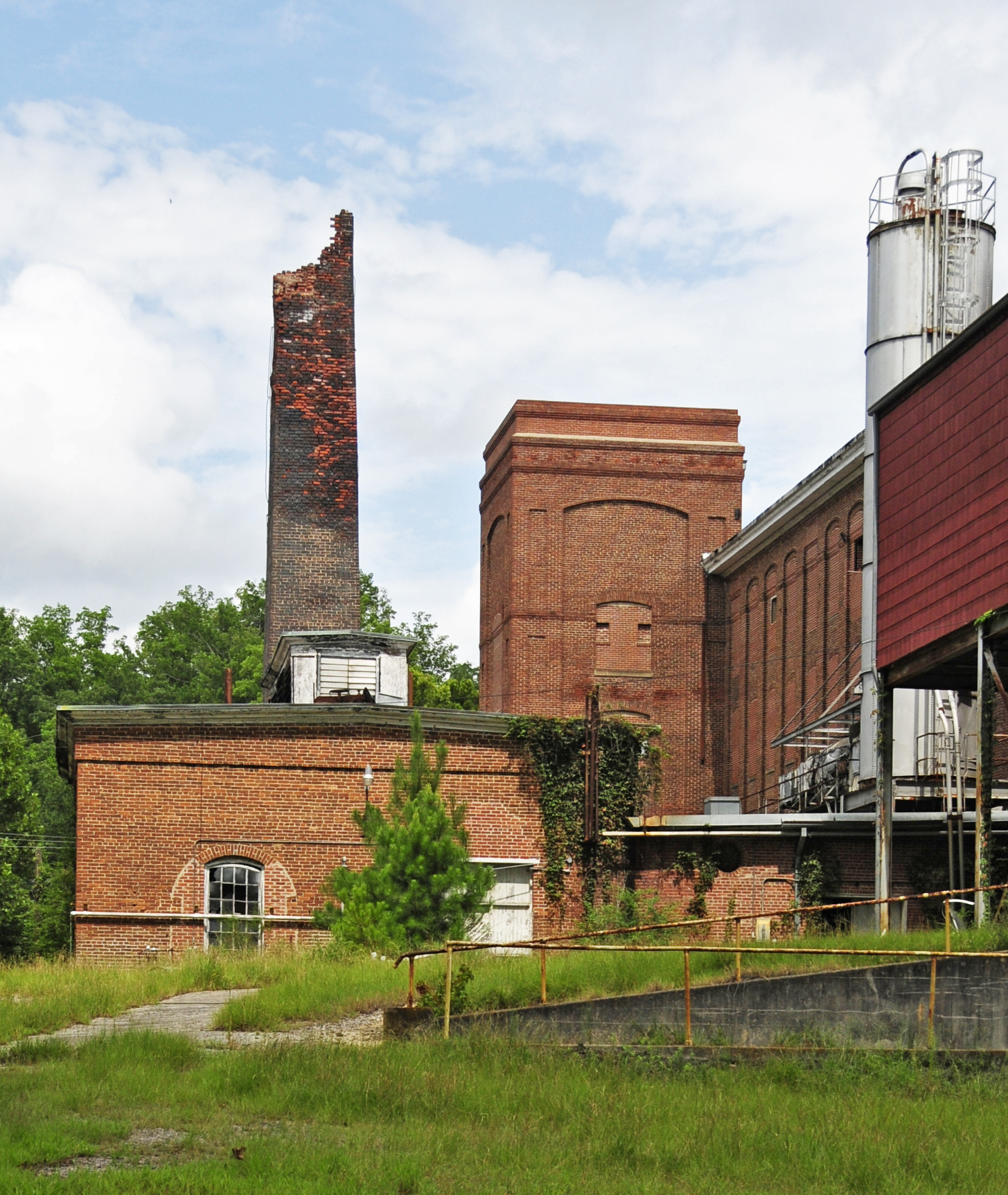
- Vaucluse Mill

- Location within South Carolina Location within the United States
- Location: SC 191, 3 mi. N of Graniteville and 6 mi. W of Aiken, Vaucluse, South Carolina
- Coordinates: 33°36′54″N 81°48′12″W
- Area: 200 acres (81 ha)
- Built: 1877; 149 years ago
- Engineer: A. D. Lockwood & Company
- Architectural style: Bungalow/craftsman, Greek Revival, Shot gun
- NRHP reference No.: 96000494
- Added to NRHP: May 7, 1996

The Vaucluse Historic District, located in Vaucluse, South Carolina in Aiken County. The district includes the mill, number of accompanying buildings, and over eighty mill village homes. The district is noteworthy in that it is considered to be oldest mill village in the state. No less significant, the mill building, completed in 1877, was based on the plans of engineers A. D. Lockwood & Company of Providence, Rhode Island. The Lockwood successor firm, Lockwood, Greene & Company, would later design around fifty of South Carolina's textile manufacturing facilities. The Vancluse Historic District was listed in the National Register of Historic Places on May 7, 1996.
