= Lockwood Mill Historic District =

Historic district in Maine, United States

- U.S. National Register of Historic Places
- U.S. Historic district
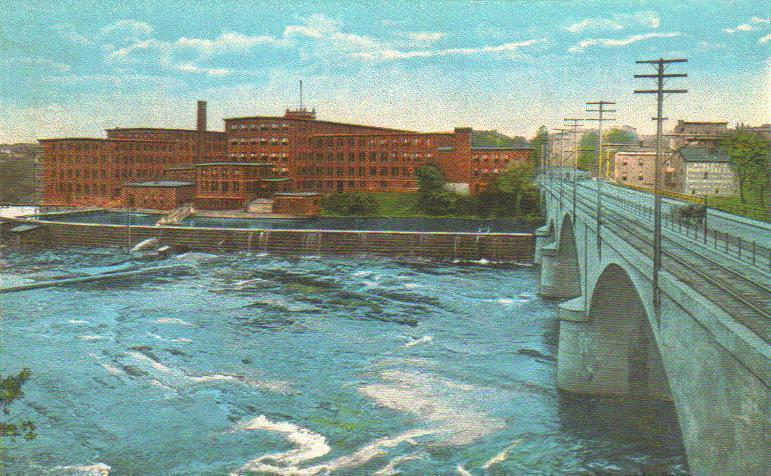
- c. 1920 postcard view

- Location within Maine Location within the United States
- Location: 6,6B,8,10 and 10B Water St., Waterville, Maine
- Coordinates: 44°32′46″N 69°37′47″W
- Area: 7.5 acres (3.0 ha)
- Built: 1873
- Architect: Amos D. Lockwood (original complex); Emil Blackstrom (1957 office remodel)
- Architectural style: Italianate, Colonial Revival, Georgian Revival
- NRHP reference No.: 07000412
- Added to NRHP: May 8, 2007

The Lockwood Mill Historic District encompasses the only major 19th-century mill complex in Waterville, Maine. Located south of the city's downtown, it was designed by (and named for) Amos D. Lockwood, a nationally known industrial designer of the period. Its #2 building was for 45 years home to the Hathaway Shirt Company. It was listed on the National Register of Historic Places in 2007.

== Description and history ==
The former Lockwood Mill complex is located on the western bank of the Kennebec River, just south of downtown Waterville and the bridge connecting it to Winslow. The mill complex includes three large brick buildings, and adjacent water control facilities for providing power to them. The mills are long rectangular buildings, ranging in height from two to five stories, with a shared commercial Italianate styling. The #1 mill was built in 1875, and the #2 and #3 mills in 1882 and 1883, each sporting a number of alterations and/or additions. Power facilities include a 1918-19 hydroelectric plant and dam, built to replace an older wooden crib dam.

Waterville's industrial textile development was relatively late in comparison to other area communities. In 1866, local businessmen made an organized effort to provide a large-scale power plant, planning for industrial development on the site of older grist and sawmills. Pursuant to these development efforts, the #1 mill was built in 1875 through the efforts of financier Reuben Dunn and mill engineer Amos Lockwood. Lockwood had prior involvement with a number of mill development efforts in northern New England, including at Saco and Lisbon Falls. The mills built here used state-of-the-art "slow burning" construction techniques designed to minimize the spread of fire, including large-dimension timbers and no concealed spaces or attics. The mills were used in cotton textile manufacturing until 1956, and the #2 mill was used from 1957 to 1992 by the Hathaway Shirt Company, an internationally known manufacturer who was one of the last shirt makers in the United States.

== See also ==
- National Register of Historic Places listings in Kennebec County, Maine
