= Continental Mill Housing =

Historic residential buildings in Maine, United States

- U.S. National Register of Historic Places
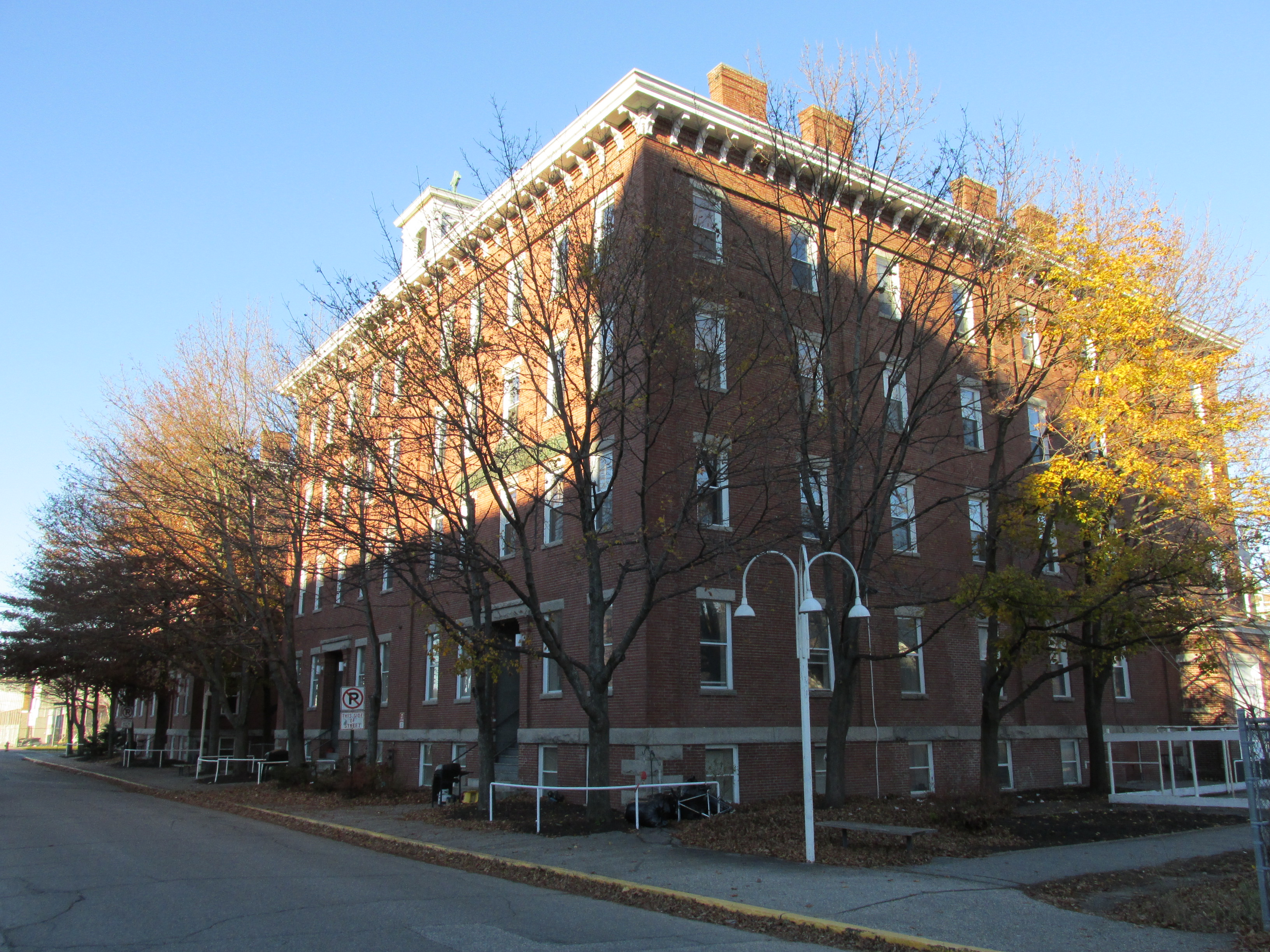
- Continental Mill Housing

- Location within Maine Location within the United States
- Location: Lewiston, Maine
- Coordinates: 44°5′30″N 70°13′11″W
- Area: 1 acre (0.40 ha)
- Built: 1866
- Built by: Albert H. Kelsey
- Architect: Amos D. Lockwood
- Architectural style: Greek Revival, Italianate
- NRHP reference No.: 79000124
- Added to NRHP: July 10, 1979

The Continental Mill Housing buildings are a pair of historic mill worker housing blocks at 66-82 Oxford Street in Lewiston, Maine. The Greek Revival/Italianate housing units were built in 1866, and are all that remain of a large number of similar buildings that once lined Oxford Street. These two buildings were listed the National Register of Historic Places in 1979.

== Description and history ==
The Continental Mill Housing blocks are located on the east side of Oxford Street on the west side of central Lewiston, facing the former Continental Mill complex, which lies between them and the Androscoggin River. The two buildings are nearly identical four-story brick structures, with shallow-pitch hip roofs with bracketed cornice, interior end chimneys, and windows with granite lintels and sills. The south building differs from the north one slightly, with a wooden cupola set near the front, and a colonnaded wooden porch on its north side. Each block is ten bays wide and six deep, with a pair of recessed entries.

The site of Continental Mill originally had a small wooden mill, built in 1858, when it was purchased in 1866 by the Continental Company. It replaced this modest structure with a much larger complex, and required housing to accommodate the large influx of workers. To this end it built a series of these tenement houses across the canal and street from the mill, a practice typical of other mill owners in the area. At that time, the property fronted the canal, with a lawn and trees presenting a dignified atmosphere. These buildings were designed by Amos D. Lockwood and supervised by Albert H. Kelsey, agent of the company.

== See also ==
- National Register of Historic Places listings in Androscoggin County, Maine
