= Piedmont, South Carolina =

Piedmont
- CDP
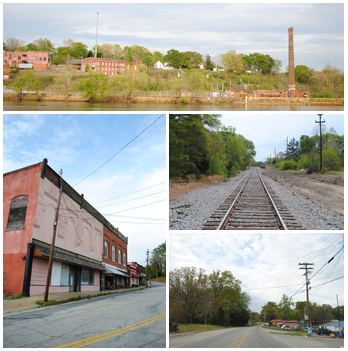
- Top, left to right: Ruins of the Piedmont Number One overlooking the Saluda River, Main Street, Railroad, Piedmont Highway

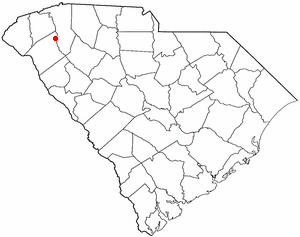
- Location of Piedmont, South Carolina
- Coordinates: 34°42′27″N 82°27′54″W
- Country: United States
- State: South Carolina
- Counties: Anderson, Greenville

Area
  - Total: 8.78 sq mi (22.73 km^{2})
  - Land: 8.59 sq mi (22.26 km^{2})
  - Water: 0.18 sq mi (0.46 km^{2})
- Elevation: 768 ft (234 m)

Population (2020)
  - Total: 5,411
  - Density: 629.5/sq mi (243.04/km^{2})
- Time zone: UTC-5 (Eastern (EST))
  - Summer (DST): UTC-4 (EDT)
- ZIP code: 29673
- Area codes: 864, 821
- FIPS code: 45-56365
- GNIS feature ID: 2403407

Piedmont is a census-designated place (CDP) along the Saluda River in Anderson and Greenville counties in the U.S. state of South Carolina. The population was 5,411 at the 2020 census.

Piedmont is a part of the Greenville-Anderson metropolitan area.

== History ==
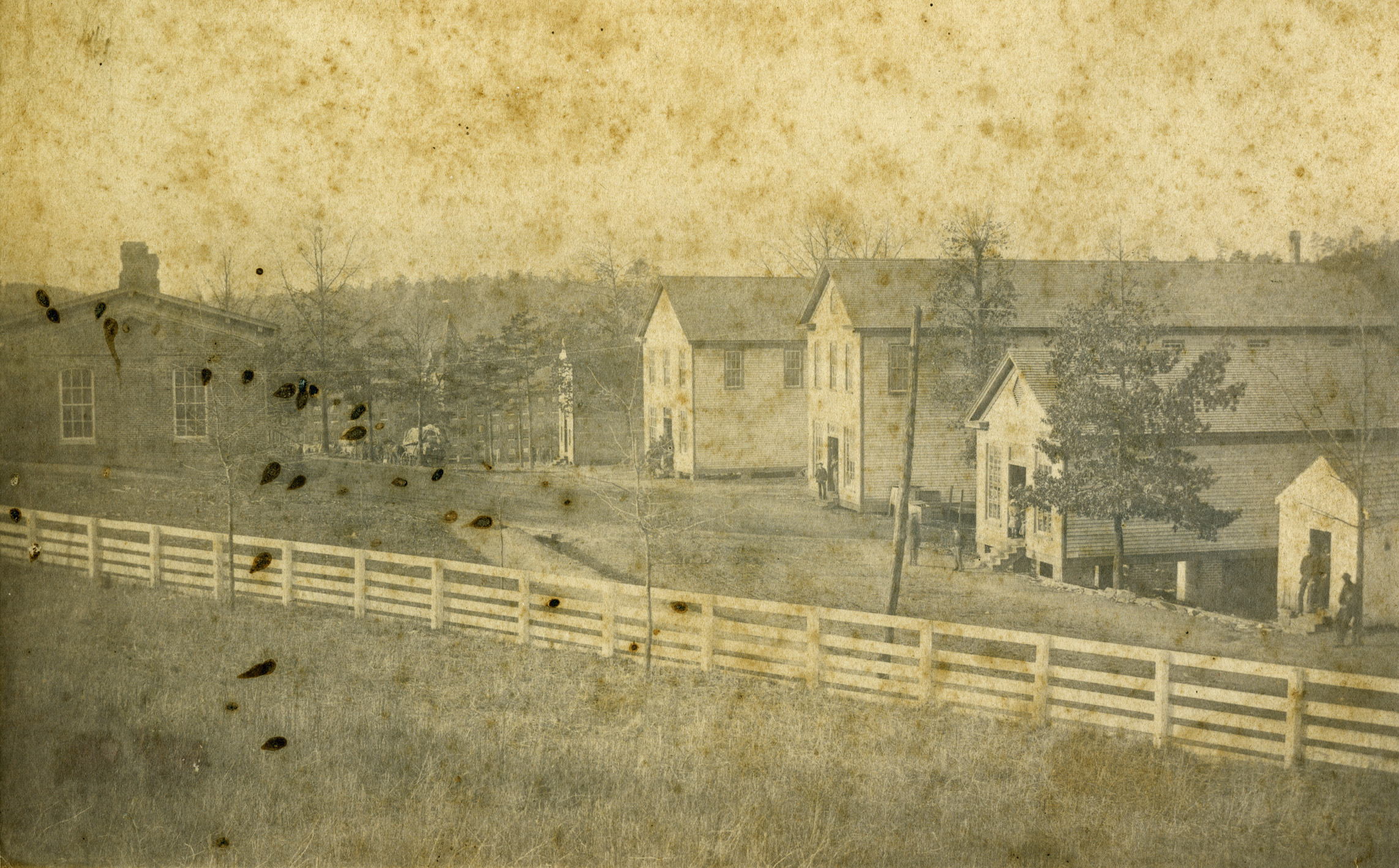
Downtown Piedmont around 1890

Native Americans and early settlers of Piedmont called the area "Big Shoals of the Saluda" after the Saluda River. The Native Americans used the shoals as a crossing. David Garrison established a grist mill around 1850 upon the shoals changing the name of the area to Garrison Shoals. Henry Pinckney Hammett bought this property for his cotton mill that used water power of the shoals. The name of the area changed again to Piedmont, "foot of the Mountains" and became a mill town. The American Civil War disrupted Hammett's project until 1876 when his plant began operations. Piedmont was added to Hammett's charter for Piedmont Manufacturing Company and a railroad station. Water power from the Saluda River was also used to produce electricity to run the machinery from the 1880s to the 1920s. The machinery of the Piedmont Manufacturing Company was from Saco Lowell and Whitin Machine Works that helped finance Hammett's company. In 1946 the mills were sold to J.P. Stevens and Company where it then was updated with modern features. Manufacturing continued until 1977 and in 1983 most of Piedmont Manufacturing Company burned down.

== Geography ==
Piedmont is located in northern Anderson County and southwestern Greenville County. It is 12 miles (19 km) south of the center of Greenville. Exit 35 on Interstate 85 is 2 miles (3 km) to the west of the center of Piedmont. South Carolina state road 86 cuts through the small town also, connecting with Interstate 85 at Exit 35. According to the United States Census Bureau, the CDP has a total area of 8.8 square miles (22.7 km^{2}), of which 8.6 square miles (22.3 km^{2}) is land and 0.15 square miles (0.4 km^{2}), or 1.93%, is water. The Saluda River flows southwards over a dam through the center of town.

== Demographics ==
Historical population
Census	Pop.	Note	%±
2000	4,684		—
2010	5,103		8.9%
2020	5,411		6.0%
U.S. Decennial Census

=== 2020 census ===
Piedmont racial composition
Race	Num.	Perc.
White (non-Hispanic)	4,321	79.86%
Black or African American (non-Hispanic)	508	9.39%
Native American	10	0.18%
Asian	16	0.3%
Other/Mixed	287	5.3%
Hispanic or Latino	269	4.97%

As of the 2020 United States census, there were 5,411 people, 1,787 households, and 1,476 families residing in the CDP.

=== 2000 census ===
As of the census of 2000, there were 4,684 people, 1,829 households, and 1,349 families residing in the CDP. The population density was 545.6 inhabitants per square mile (210.7/km^{2}). There were 1,992 housing units at an average density of 232.0 per square mile (89.6/km^{2}). The racial makeup of the CDP was 92.08% White, 5.85% African American, 0.19% Native American, 0.23% Asian, 0.02% Pacific Islander, 0.11% from other races, and 1.52% from two or more races. Hispanic or Latino of any race were 1.20% of the population.

There were 1,829 households, out of which 32.9% had children under the age of 18 living with them, 57.4% were married couples living together, 12.4% had a female householder with no husband present, and 26.2% were non-families. 23.1% of all households were made up of individuals, and 9.6% had someone living alone who was 65 years of age or older. The average household size was 2.52 and the average family size was 2.95.

In the CDP, the population was spread out, with 24.9% under the age of 18, 7.7% from 18 to 24, 29.7% from 25 to 44, 23.9% from 45 to 64, and 13.9% who were 65 years of age or older. The median age was 37 years. For every 100 females, there were 90.8 males. For every 100 females age 18 and over, there were 85.8 males.

The median income for a household in the CDP was $36,310, and the median income for a family was $41,654. Males had a median income of $34,890 versus $23,250 for females. The per capita income for the CDP was $16,982. About 7.9% of families and 10.5% of the population were below the poverty line, including 11.6% of those under age 18 and 15.8% of those age 65 or over.

== Arts and culture ==
Piedmont has a public library, a branch of the Anderson County Library System.

== Education ==
In Greenville County the portion of the CDP is in the Greenville County School District. In Anderson County the portion of the CDP is in Anderson School District 1.

Schools in Piedmont include Wren High School, Wren Middle School, Wren Elementary School, Spearman Elementary School all located in Anderson School District One, and Woodmont High School, Woodmont Middle School, and Sue Cleveland Elementary School all located in the Greenville County School District.

== Notable people ==
- Ian Henderson, racing driver
- Bud Crothers, racing driver
- Corinne Boyd Riley, U.S. Representative from South Carolina, 1962-1963

== In popular culture ==
- The Birth of a Nation was predominantly set in Piedmont.
