= We Shall Overcome =

Protest song of the civil rights movement

Song
- Written: 1945
- Venue: 1945–1946 Charleston Cigar Factory strike
- Genre: African-American work songs; Protest songs
- Songwriters: Lucille Simmons, Pete Seeger

"We Shall Overcome" (3:24)
Performed by Joan Baez at the White House in front of President Barack Obama, at a celebration of music from the period of the civil rights movement

"We Shall Overcome" is a gospel song that is associated heavily with the U.S. civil rights movement. The origins of the song are unclear; it was thought to have descended from "I'll Overcome Some Day," a hymn by Charles Albert Tindley, while the modern version of the song was first said to have been sung by tobacco workers led by Lucille Simmons during the 1945–1946 Charleston Cigar Factory strike in Charleston, South Carolina.

In 1947, the song was published under the title "We Will Overcome" in an edition of the People's Songs Bulletin, as a contribution of and with an introduction by Zilphia Horton, then the music director of the Highlander Folk School of Monteagle, Tennessee—an adult education school that trained union organizers. She taught it to many others, including People's Songs director Pete Seeger, who included it in his repertoire, as did many other activist singers, such as Frank Hamilton and Joe Glazer.

In 1959, the song began to be associated with the civil rights movement as a protest song, when Guy Carawan stepped in with his and Seeger's version as song leader at Highlander, which was then focused on nonviolent civil rights activism. It quickly became the movement's unofficial anthem. Seeger and other famous folksingers in the early 1960s, such as Joan Baez, sang the song at rallies, folk festivals, and concerts in the North and helped make it widely known. Since its rise to prominence, the song, and songs based on it, have been used in a variety of protests worldwide.

The U.S. copyright of the People's Songs Bulletin issue which contained "We Will Overcome" expired in 1976, but The Richmond Organization (TRO) asserted a copyright on the "We Shall Overcome" lyrics, registered in 1960. In 2017, in response to a lawsuit against TRO over allegations of false copyright claims, a U.S. judge issued an opinion that the registered work was insufficiently different from the "We Will Overcome" lyrics that had fallen into the public domain because of non-renewal. In January 2018, the company agreed to a settlement under which it would no longer assert any copyright claims over the song.

In 2025, the publication Rolling Stone ranked Seeger's adaptation of the song at number 8 on its list of "The 100 Best Protest Songs of All Time". In June 2026, CBS News included the song in its list of the 250 essential American songs of the past 250 years.

== Origins as gospel, folk, and labor song ==
"I'll Overcome Some Day" was a hymn or gospel music composition by the Reverend Charles Albert Tindley of Philadelphia that was first published in 1901. A noted minister of the Methodist Episcopal Church, Tindley was the author of approximately 50 gospel hymns, of which "We'll Understand It By and By" and "Stand by Me" are among the best known. The published text bore the epigraph, "Ye shall overcome if ye faint not", derived from Galatians 6:9: "And let us not be weary in doing good, for in due season we shall reap, if we faint not." The first stanza began:

The world is one great battlefield,
With forces all arrayed;
If in my heart I do not yield,
I'll overcome some day.

Tindley's songs were written in an idiom rooted in African American folk traditions, using pentatonic intervals, with ample space allowed for improvised interpolation, the addition of "blue" thirds and sevenths, and frequently featuring short refrains in which the congregation could join. Tindley's importance, however, was primarily as a lyricist and poet whose words spoke directly to the feelings of his audiences, many of whom had been freed from slavery only 36 years before he first published his songs, and were often impoverished, illiterate, and newly arrived in the North. "Even today," wrote musicologist Horace Boyer in 1983, "ministers quote his texts in the midst of their sermons as if they were poems, as indeed they are."

A letter printed on the front page of the February 1909 United Mine Workers Journal states: "Last year at a strike, we opened every meeting with a prayer, and singing that good old song, 'We Will Overcome'." This statement implied that the song was well-known, and it was also the first acknowledgment of such a song having been sung in both a secular context and a mixed-race setting.

Tindley's "I'll Overcome Some Day" was believed to have influenced the structure for "We Shall Overcome", with both the text and the melody having undergone a process of alteration. The tune has been changed so that it now echoes the opening and closing melody of "No More Auction Block for Me", also known from its refrain as "Many Thousands Gone". This was number 35 in Thomas Wentworth Higginson's collection of Negro Spirituals that appeared in The Atlantic Monthly of June 1867, with a comment by Higginson reflecting on how such songs were composed (i.e., whether the work of a single author or through what used to be called "communal composition"):

Even of this last composition, however, we have only the approximate date and know nothing of the mode of composition. Allan Ramsay says of the Scots Songs, that, no matter who made them, they were soon attributed to the minister of the parish whence they sprang. And I always wondered, about these, whether they had always a conscious and definite origin in some leading mind, or whether they grew by gradual accretion, in an almost unconscious way. On this point, I could get no information, though I asked many questions, until at last, one day when I was being rowed across from Beaufort to Ladies' Island, I found myself, with delight, on the actual trail of a song. One of the oarsmen, a brisk young fellow, not a soldier, on being asked for his theory of the matter, dropped out a coy confession. "Some good spirituals," he said, "are start jess out o' curiosity. I been a-raise a sing, myself, once."

My dream was fulfilled, and I had traced out, not the poem alone, but the poet. I implored him to proceed.

"Once we boys," he said, "went for to tote some rice, and de nigger-driver, he keep a-calling on us; and I say, 'O, de ole nigger-driver!' Den another said, 'First thing my mammy told me was, notin' so bad as a nigger-driver.' Den I made a sing, just puttin' a word, and den another word."

Then he began singing, and the men, after listening a moment, joined in the chorus as if it were an old acquaintance, though they evidently had never heard it before. I saw how easily a new "sing" took root among them.

Bob Dylan used the same melodic motif from "No More Auction Block" for his composition, "Blowin' in the Wind". Thus similarities of melodic and rhythmic patterns imparted cultural and emotional resonance ("the same feeling") towards three different, and historically very significant songs.

Music scholars have also pointed out that the first half of "We Shall Overcome" bears a notable resemblance to the famous lay Catholic hymn "O sanctissima", also known as "The Sicilian Mariners Hymn", first published by a London magazine in 1792 and then by an American magazine in 1794 and widely circulated in American hymnals. The second half of "We Shall Overcome" is essentially the same music as the 19th-century hymn "I'll Be All Right". As Victor Bobetsky summarized in his 2015 book on the subject: "'We Shall Overcome' owes its existence to many ancestors and to the constant change and adaptation that is typical of the folk music process."

== Role of the Highlander Folk School ==
In October 1945 in Charleston, South Carolina, members of the Food, Tobacco, Agricultural, and Allied Workers union (FTA-CIO), who were mostly female and African American, began a five-month strike against the American Tobacco Company. To keep up their spirits during the cold, wet winter of 1945–1946, one of the strikers, a woman named Lucille Simmons, led a slow "long meter style" version of the gospel hymn, "We'll Overcome (I'll Be All Right)" to end each day's picketing. Union organizer Zilphia Horton, who was the wife of the co-founder of the Highlander Folk School (later Highlander Research and Education Center), said she learned it from Simmons. Horton was Highlander's music director during 1935–1956, and it became her custom to end group meetings each evening by leading this, her favorite song. During the presidential campaign of Henry A. Wallace, "We Will Overcome" was printed in Bulletin No. 3 (September 1948), 8, of People's Songs, with an introduction by Horton saying that she had learned it from the interracial FTA-CIO workers and had found it to be extremely powerful. Pete Seeger, a founding member of People's Songs and its director for three years, learned it from Horton's version in 1947. Seeger writes: "I changed it to 'We shall'... I think I liked a more open sound; 'We will' has alliteration to it, but 'We shall' opens the mouth wider; the 'i' in 'will' is not an easy vowel to sing well ...." Seeger also added some verses ("We'll walk hand in hand" and "The whole wide world around").

In 1950, the CIO's Department of Education and Research released the album, Eight New Songs for Labor, sung by Joe Glazer ("Labor's Troubador"), and the Elm City Four. (Songs on the album were: "I Ain't No Stranger Now", "Too Old to Work", "That's All", "Humblin' Back", "Shine on Me", "Great Day", "The Mill Was Made of Marble", and "We Will Overcome".) During a Southern CIO drive, Glazer taught the song to country singer Texas Bill Strength, who cut a version that was later picked up by 4-Star Records.

The song made its first recorded appearance as "We Shall Overcome" (rather than "We Will Overcome") in 1952 on a disc recorded by Laura Duncan (soloist) and The Jewish Young Singers (chorus), conducted by Robert De Cormier, co-produced by Ernie Lieberman and Irwin Silber on Hootenany Records (Hoot 104-A) (Folkways, FN 2513, BCD15720), where it is identified as a Negro Spiritual.

Frank Hamilton, a folk singer from California who was a member of People's Songs and later The Weavers, picked up Seeger's version. Hamilton's friend and traveling companion, fellow-Californian Guy Carawan, learned the song from Hamilton. Carawan and Hamilton, accompanied by Ramblin' Jack Elliot, visited Highlander in the early 1950s where they also would have heard Zilphia Horton sing the song. In 1957, Seeger sang for a Highlander audience that included Dr. Martin Luther King Jr., who remarked on the way to his next stop, in Kentucky, about how much the song had stuck with him. When, in 1959, Guy Carawan succeeded Horton as music director at Highlander, he reintroduced it at the school. It was the young (many of them teenagers) student-activists at Highlander, however, who gave the song the words and rhythms for which it is currently known, when they sang it to keep their spirits up during the frightening police raids on Highlander and their subsequent stays in jail in 1959–1960. Because of this, Carawan has been reluctant to claim credit for the song's widespread popularity. In the PBS video We Shall Overcome, Julian Bond credits Carawan with teaching and singing the song at the founding meeting of the Student Nonviolent Coordinating Committee in Raleigh, North Carolina, in 1960. From there, it spread orally and became an anthem of Southern African American labor union and civil rights activism. Seeger has also publicly, in concert, credited Carawan with the primary role of teaching and popularizing the song within the civil rights movement.

== Use in the 1960s civil rights and other protest movements ==
In August 1963, 22-year old folksinger Joan Baez led a crowd of 3,000 in singing "We Shall Overcome" at the Lincoln Memorial during the March on Washington. President Lyndon Johnson, himself a Southerner, used the phrase "we shall overcome" in addressing Congress on March 15, 1965, in a speech delivered after the violent "Bloody Sunday" attacks on civil rights demonstrators during the Selma to Montgomery marches, thus legitimizing the protest movement.

Four days before the April 4, 1968 assassination of Martin Luther King Jr., King recited the words from "We Shall Overcome" in his final sermon, delivered in Memphis on Sunday, March 31. He had done so in a similar sermon he gave previously in 1965 to an interfaith congregation at Temple Israel of Hollywood, California:

We shall overcome. We shall overcome. Deep in my heart I do believe we shall overcome. And I believe it because somehow the arc of the moral universe is long, but it bends towards justice. We shall overcome because Carlyle is right; "no lie can live forever". We shall overcome because William Cullen Bryant is right; "truth crushed to earth will rise again". We shall overcome because James Russell Lowell is right:

Truth forever on the scaffold,
Wrong forever on the throne.
Yet that scaffold sways the future,
And behind the then unknown
Standeth God within the shadow,
Keeping watch above his own.

With this faith, we will be able to hew out of the mountain of despair a stone of hope. With this faith, we will be able to transform the jangling discords of our nation into a beautiful symphony of brotherhood. With this faith, we will be able to speed up the day. And in the words of prophecy, every valley shall be exalted. And every mountain and hill shall be made low. The rough places will be made plain and the crooked places straight. And the glory of the Lord shall be revealed and all flesh shall see it together. This will be a great day. This will be a marvelous hour. And at that moment—figuratively speaking in biblical words—the morning stars will sing together and the sons of God will shout for joy

"We Shall Overcome" was sung days later by over 50,000 attendees at the funeral of Martin Luther King Jr.

Farmworkers in the United States later sang the song in Spanish during the strikes and grape boycotts of the late 1960s. The song was notably sung by the U.S. Senator for New York Robert F. Kennedy, when he led anti-Apartheid crowds in choruses from the rooftop of his car while touring South Africa in 1966. It was also the song which Abie Nathan chose to broadcast as the anthem of the Voice of Peace radio station on October 1, 1993, and as a result it found its way back to South Africa in the later years of the Anti-Apartheid Movement.

William Bradford Reynolds, facing a mounting torrent of criticism for not moving fast enough on civil rights enforcement in the 1980s, sang "We Shall Overcome" hand in hand with Jesse Jackson on a trip to meet with the black communities of the Mississippi Delta.

The Northern Ireland Civil Rights Association adopted "we shall overcome" as a slogan and used it in the title of its retrospective publication, We Shall Overcome – The History of the Struggle for Civil Rights in Northern Ireland 1968–1978. The film Bloody Sunday depicts march leader and Member of Parliament (MP) Ivan Cooper leading the song shortly before 1972's Bloody Sunday shootings. In 1997, the Christian men's ministry, Promise Keepers featured the song on its worship CD for that year: The Making of a Godly Man, featuring worship leader Donn Thomas and the Maranatha! Promise Band. Bruce Springsteen's re-interpretation of the song was included on the 1998 tribute album Where Have All the Flowers Gone: The Songs of Pete Seeger as well as on Springsteen's 2006 album We Shall Overcome: The Seeger Sessions.

On March 4, 2025, Representative Al Green (D-TX 9) and several colleagues sang the song a cappella in protest during President Donald Trump's 2025 speech to a joint session of Congress. Green was removed from the House chamber by U.S. Capitol Police for the remainder of the evening for another interruption regarding Medicaid and was subsequently censured by the House of Representatives for disrupting the president's joint address to Congress, pursuant to a resolution introduced the next morning by Representative Dan Newhouse (R-WA 4). The resolution to censure Green officially passed the House of Representatives 224 to 198 via roll call vote on March 6, 2025, with 'Yea' votes from all 214 House Republican members along with ten House Democrats. In the aftermath, Green and several members broke out into the song again on the well.

== Widespread adaptation ==
"We Shall Overcome" was adopted by various labor, nationalist, and political movements both during and after the Cold War. In his memoir about his years teaching English in Czechoslovakia after the Velvet Revolution, Mark Allen wrote:

In Prague in 1989, during the intense weeks of the Velvet Revolution, hundreds of thousands of people sang this haunting music in unison in Wenceslas Square, both in English and in Czech, with special emphasis on the phrase "I do believe." This song's message of hope gave protesters strength to carry on until the powers-that-be themselves finally gave up hope themselves.

[...]

In the Prague of 1964, Seeger was stunned to find himself being whistled and booed by crowds of Czechs when he spoke out against the Vietnam War. But those same crowds had loved and adopted his rendition of "We Shall Overcome." History is full of such ironies – if only you are willing to see them.

— Mark Allen, Prague Symphony, 2008

The words "We shall overcome" are sung emphatically at the end of each verse in a song of Northern Ireland's civil rights movement, Free the People, which protested against the internment policy of the British Army. The movement in Northern Ireland was keen to emulate the movement in the US and often sang "We shall overcome".

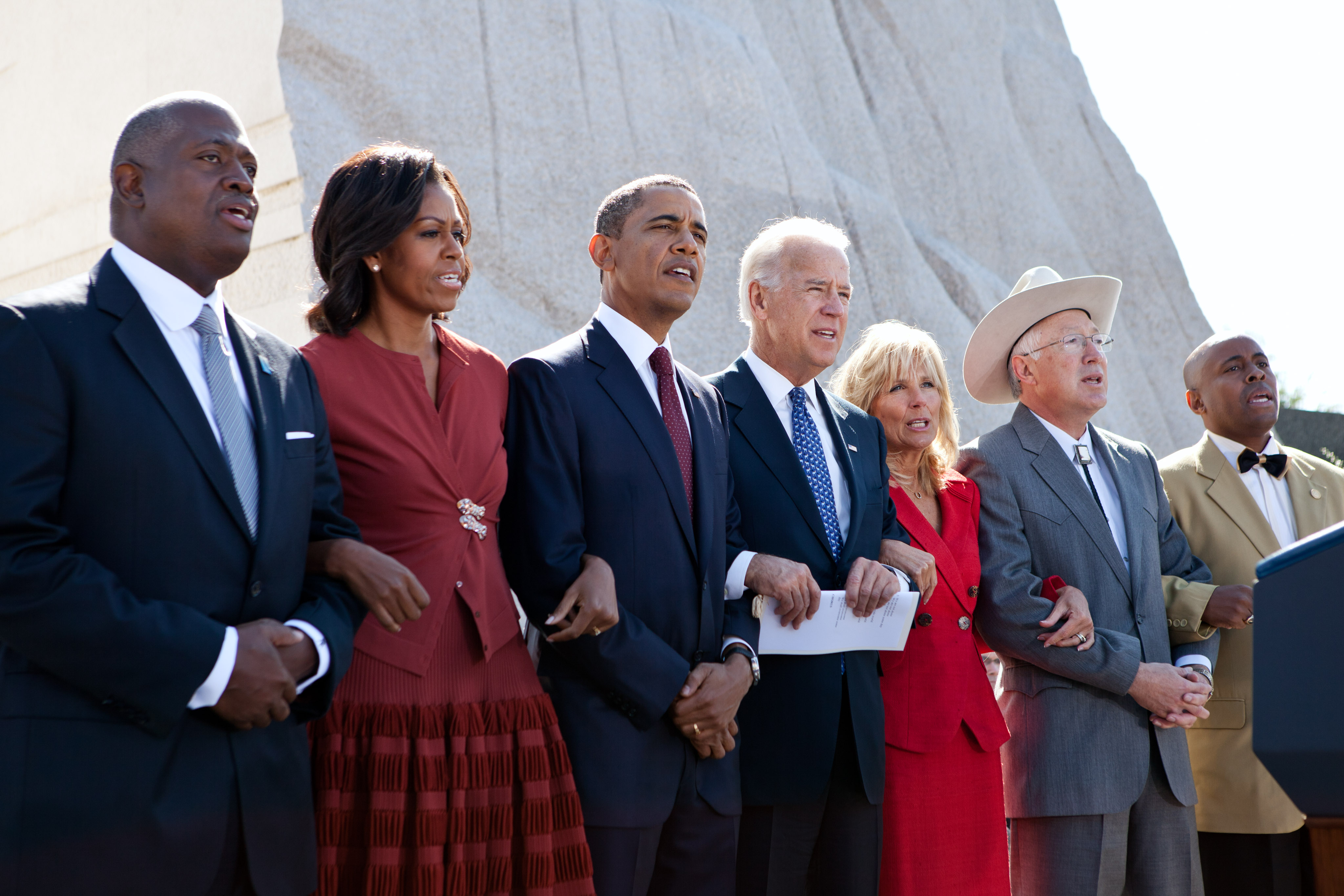
U.S. President Barack Obama, Vice President Joe Biden and their wives link arms and sing "We Shall Overcome" at the dedication of the Martin Luther King Jr. Memorial in 2011.

The melody was also used (crediting it to Tindley) in a symphony by American composer William Rowland. In 1999, National Public Radio included "We Shall Overcome" on the "NPR 100" list of most important American songs of the 20th century. As a reference to the line, in 2009, after the first inauguration of Barack Obama as the 44th President of the United States, a man holding the banner, "WE HAVE OVERCOME" was seen near the Capitol, a day after hundreds of people posed with the sign on Martin Luther King Jr. Day.

As the attempted serial killer "Lasermannen" shot several immigrants around Stockholm in 1992, Prime Minister Carl Bildt and Immigration Minister Birgit Friggebo attended a meeting in Rinkeby. As the audience became upset, Friggebo tried to calm them down by proposing everyone sing "We Shall Overcome". This statement is widely regarded as one of the most embarrassing moments in Swedish politics. In 2008, the newspaper Svenska Dagbladet listed the Sveriges Television recording of the event as the best political clip available on YouTube.

On June 7, 2010, Roger Waters of Pink Floyd released a new version of the song as a protest against the Israeli blockade of Gaza.

On July 22, 2012, Bruce Springsteen performed the song during the memorial-concert in Oslo after the terrorist attacks in Norway on July 22, 2011.

In India, poet Girija Kumar Mathur composed a literal translation in Hindi "Hum Honge Kaamyab (हम होंगे कामयाब)" which became a popular patriotic/spiritual song during the 1970s and 1980s, particularly in schools. This song also came to be used by the Blue Pilgrims for motivating the India national football team during international matches.

In Bengali-speaking India and Bangladesh, there are two versions, both of which are popular among schoolchildren and political activists. "Amra Korbo Joy" ("আমরা করবো জয়"), is a literal translation by Bengali folk singer Hemanga Biswas, re-recorded by Bhupen Hazarika. Hazarika, who had heard the song during his days in the United States, also translated the song to Assamese as "Ami hom xophol" ("আমি হ'ম সফল"). Another version, translated by Shibdas Bandyopadhyay, "Ek Din Shurjer Bhor" ("এক দিন সূর্যের ভোর", literally "One Day the Sun Will Rise") was arranged by Ruma Guha Thakurta and recorded by the Calcutta Youth Choir during the 1971 Bangladesh War of Independence, becoming one of the bestselling Bengali records. It was a favorite of Prime Minister Sheikh Mujibur Rahman, and it was regularly sung at public events after Bangladesh gained its independence in 1971.

In the Indian state of Kerala, a traditional Communist stronghold, the song became popular on college campuses during the late 1970s. It was the struggle song of the Students Federation of India (SFI), the largest student organisation in the country. The song translated into the local Malayalam as "Nammal Vijayikkum" by SFI activist N. P. Chandrasekharan, using the same tune of the original. Later, it was published in Student, the monthly magazine of SFI in Malayalam as well as in Sarvadesheeya Ganangal (Mythri Books, Thiruvananthapuram), a translation of international struggle songs.

"We Shall Overcome" was a prominent song in the 2010 Bollywood film My Name Is Khan, which compared the struggle of Muslims in modern America with the struggles of African Americans in the past. The song was sung in both English and Hindi in the film, which starred Kajol and Shah Rukh Khan.

In 2014, a recording of "We Shall Overcome" arranged by composer Nolan Williams Jr. and featuring mezzo-soprano Denyce Graves was among several works of art, including the poem "A Brave and Startling Truth" by Maya Angelou, were sent to space on the first test flight of the spacecraft Orion.

The Argentine writer and singer María Elena Walsh wrote a Spanish version called "Venceremos".

Celtic punk band Dropkick Murphys released their version of the song as a single and music video in 2022. Their version can also be found on the expanded edition of their 2021 album, Turn Up That Dial.

== Copyright status ==
The copyright status of "We Shall Overcome" was disputed in the late 2010s. A copyright registration was made for the song in 1960, which is credited as an arrangement by Zilphia Horton, Guy Carawan, Frank Hamilton, and Pete Seeger, of a work entitled "I'll Overcome", with no known original author. Horton's heirs, Carawan, Hamilton, and Seeger share the artists' half of the rights, and The Richmond Organization (TRO), which includes Ludlow Music, Essex, Folkways Music, and Hollis Music, holds the publishers' rights, to 50% of the royalty earnings. Seeger explained that he registered the copyright under the advice of TRO, who showed concern that someone else could register it. "At that time we didn't know Lucille Simmons' name", Seeger said. Their royalties go to the "We Shall Overcome" Fund, administered by Highlander under the trusteeship of the "writers". Such funds are purportedly used to give small grants for cultural expression involving African Americans organizing in the U.S. South.

In April 2016, a lawsuit was filed against TRO and Ludlow by the We Shall Overcome Foundation (WSOF), a group led by producer Isaias Gamboa that was denied permission to use the song in a documentary on its history. The suit alleged that the TRO-Ludlow copyright claims were invalid because the copyright had not been renewed as required by United States copyright law at the time, and that the copyright of the 1948 People's Songs publication containing "We Will Overcome" had therefore expired in 1976. Additionally, it was argued that the registered copyrights only covered specific arrangements of the tune and "obscure alternate verses", that the registered works "did not contain original works of authorship, except to the extent of the arrangements themselves", and that no record of a work entitled "I'll Overcome" existed in the database of the United States Copyright Office. The WSOF was working on a documentary about the song and its history, and were denied permission to use the song by TRO-Ludlow. The suit sought to have the copyright status of the song clarified, and the return of all royalties collected by the companies from its usage.

The suit acknowledged that Seeger himself had not claimed to be an author of the song, stating of the song in his autobiography, "No one is certain who changed 'will' to 'shall.' It could have been me with my Harvard education. But Septima Clarke, a Charleston schoolteacher (who was director of education at Highlander and after the civil rights movement was elected year after year to the Charleston, S.C. Board of Education) always preferred 'shall.' It sings better." He also reaffirmed that the decision to copyright the song was a defensive measure, with his publisher apparently warning him that "if you don't copyright this now, some Hollywood types will have a version out next year like 'Come on Baby, We shall overcome tonight'". Furthermore, the liner notes of Seeger's compilation album If I Had a Hammer: Songs of Hope & Struggle contained a summary on the purported history of the song, stating that "We Shall Overcome" was "probably adapted from the 19th-century hymn, 'I'll Be All Right'", and that "I'll Overcome Some Day" was a "possible source" and may have originally been adapted from "I'll Be All Right".

Gamboa had shown interest in investigating the origins of "We Shall Overcome"; in the book We Shall Overcome: Sacred Song on the Devil's Tongue, he notably disputed the song's claimed origins and copyright registration with an alternate theory, suggesting that "We Shall Overcome" was actually derived from "If My Jesus Wills", a hymn by Louise Shropshire that had been composed in the 1930s and had its copyright registered in 1954. The WSOF lawsuit did not invoke this theory, focusing instead on the original belief that the song stemmed from "We Will Overcome". The lawyer backing Gamboa's suit, Mark C. Rifkin, was previously involved in a case that invalidated copyright claims over the song "Happy Birthday to You".

On September 8, 2017, Judge Denise Cote of the Southern District of New York issued an opinion that there were insufficient differences between the first verse of the "We Shall Overcome" lyrics registered by TRO-Ludlow, and the "We Will Overcome" lyrics from People's Songs (specifically, the aforementioned replacement of "will" with "shall", and changing "down in my heart" to "deep in my heart") for it to qualify as a distinct derivative work eligible for its own copyright.

On January 26, 2018, TRO-Ludlow agreed to a final settlement, under which it would no longer claim copyright over the melody or lyrics to "We Shall Overcome". In addition, TRO-Ludlow agreed that the melody and lyrics were thereafter dedicated to the public domain.

== See also ==
- Civil rights movement in popular culture
- Timeline of the civil rights movement
- Christian child's prayer § Spirituals
