= Quinebaug Mill–Quebec Square Historic District =

Historic district in Connecticut, United States

- U.S. National Register of Historic Places
- U.S. Historic district
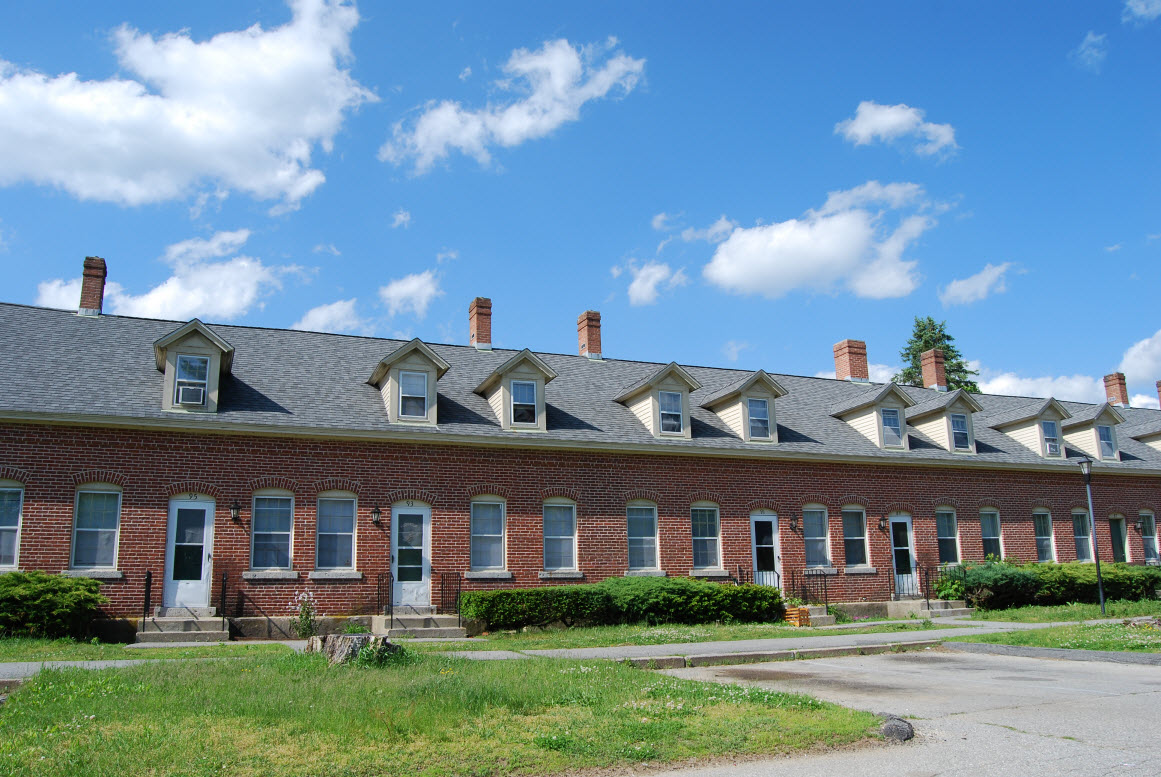
- Row houses in Quebec Square

- Location within Connecticut Location within the United States
- Location: Brooklyn, Connecticut
- Coordinates: 41°47′54″N 71°53′21″W
- Area: 40 acres (16 ha)
- Architect: Amos D. Lockwood
- Architectural style: Greek Revival, Italianate, Queen Anne
- NRHP reference No.: 85001921
- Added to NRHP: August 29, 1985

Quinebaug Mill–Quebec Square Historic District is a historic district roughly bounded by the Quinebaug River, Quebec Square, and Elm and S. Main Streets in the town of Brooklyn (extending partly into the town of Killingly) in Windham County, Connecticut, United States. The district encompasses a well-preserved 19th-century mill village. It was added to the National Register of Historic Places in 1985.

== Description and history ==
The district is primarily located within the census-designated place of East Brooklyn and is within the village of Quebec. It consists of the weave shed built by the Quinebaug Mill Company and the surrounding residential area known as Quebec village. The residential portions of the village are characterized by rows of brick mill worker housing, some in long rows of attached housing units, others in smaller combinations housing between two and four units. Stylistically, the buildings range from the Greek Revival to the Queen Anne.

The Quinebaug Mill was built by Amos D. Lockwood starting in 1851 on the Quinebaug River, near the site of an 1820 Tiffany Mill. The Quinebaug Mill became one of the largest and most complete cotton mills in Connecticut by the end of the 19th century. Most of the mill was destroyed by fire, but the weave shed and the houses for workers survived. The housing area, which dates back from 1881, was rebuilt as low-cost housing in 1984 and contains six brick row houses, each containing eight apartments, surrounding a green space.

The historic district is considered to be a well-preserved example of a textile mill village, a type of company town that was common in 19th-century eastern Connecticut.

== See also ==
- National Register of Historic Places listings in Windham County, Connecticut
