= National Textile Association =

Logo of the National Textile Association.

The National Textile Association is the United States's oldest and largest association of fabric-forming companies. NTA members knit and weave fabric in the U.S.; supply fibers, yarns to the fabric-forming industry; or supply other materials or services to the American textile industry.

== History ==
The National Textile Association traces its history to 1854, the founding date of the Hampden County (Massachusetts) Cotton Spinners' Association, subsequently renamed the New England Cotton Manufacturers' Association (1865). The organization was incorporated in the Commonwealth of Massachusetts on December 1, 1894. The organization became the National Association of Cotton Manufacturers (NACM) in April, 1906. The Northern Textile Association was founded April 17, 1953 by the NACM, in time for the 100th Annual Meeting of the Association in 1954. The NACM and NTA held joint meetings from April 17, 1953, to September 27, 1956. On December 7, 1956, the NACM filed the legal change of name to NTA. (On October 30, 1991, the legal name was changed to Northern Textile Association, Inc.) In 2002, by a vote of the Knitted Textile Association (founded in 1966) in August and the NTA in September, the Knitted Textile Association and the Northern Textile Association merged to form the National Textile Association.

== Governance ==
The Association is governed by officers—chairman, vice chairman, president, vice president, treasurer and secretary—elected annually and a board of directors elected for three-year terms and divided into three classes so that one-third of the directors are elected each year. Roger Berkley of the company Weave Corporation is the current chairman of the Association.
