= Carawan =

Carawan is a surname. Notable people with the surname include:

- Candie Carawan (born 1939), American civil rights activist, singer, and author
- Claudia Carawan (born 1959), American singer-songwriter and pianist
- Evan Carawan, American hammered dulcimer player
- Guy Carawan (1927–2015), American folk musician and musicologist
