= May Justus =

American writer (1898–1989)

- Born: May 12, 1898; Del Rio, Tennessee, US
- Died: November 7, 1989 (aged 91)
- Resting place: Summerfield Cemetery, Grundy County, Tennessee, USA
- Education: University of Tennessee
- Occupations: Teacher; Children's author

May Justus (May 12, 1898 – November 7, 1989) was an American author of numerous children's books, almost all of which were set in Appalachia and reflect the traditional culture of her native East Tennessee. She also worked as a teacher and served for many years as volunteer secretary-treasurer for the Highlander Folk School.

== Biography ==
May Justus was born in Del Rio, Tennessee, in 1898. She was one of the ten children of schoolteacher Stephen Justus and his wife Margaret Brooks Justus. Traditional storytelling and major works of literature were both prominent elements in the Justus home, where family members had a regular practice of reading books aloud.

At the University of Tennessee in Knoxville she studied to become a teacher, graduating with a bachelor's degree. Her first written work grew out of her experiences as a young teacher, as she began to write down the stories that she told to an eager audience of students after they had finished her classwork.

Sometime before 1932, Justus worked as a teacher in a mission school in a remote area of Lee County, Kentucky, together with Vera McCampbell, her long-time companion. When McCampbell's mother, who was living with them, developed cancer, the two women decided to move to a place where they would have better access to a hospital for medical care. Accordingly, they accepted an invitation from Lillian Johnson to join her in the rural community of Summerfield (near Monteagle) in Grundy County, Tennessee, where Johnson had founded a progressive school called the Summerfield School. Justus and McCampbell became two of Summerfield's three teachers. In addition to offering a traditional curriculum to students up to grade 8, they taught arts and crafts, sold student-made handicrafts to help raise funds, and helped provide meals for students through a communal soup pot.

In 1932, Myles Horton and Don West persuaded Lillian Johnson to let them try operating Summerfield after the model of a Danish folk school, thus allowing Johnson to retire. After a tentative start, the new arrangement became permanent, transforming the Summerfield School into the Highlander Folk School. Justus and McCampbell soon left the school and went to work as teachers at a nearby public school. However, West managed to recruit Justus to become a volunteer at Highlander, and she continued in that capacity until Highlander's forced closure and relocation (in 1961), serving for many years as Highlander's secretary-treasurer.

Justus retired from full-time teaching in 1939 due to a heart ailment. Subsequently, she devoted more of her time to her writing. For many years after she stopped regular teaching, however, she provided special instruction to children with various special needs, conducted a program of stories and songs for children, and kept an attic library for children, all in the home she shared with McCampbell.

Having lived her entire life in rural Appalachia, Justus had her first encounters with African Americans and became a committed supporter of racial equality through her work with the Highlander Folk School. She formed a particularly close connection with Septima Clark, an African American woman who had lost her teaching job in Charleston, South Carolina, because of her membership in the NAACP, and who coordinated a Highlander program in South Carolina that taught African Americans to read. Like Justus, Clark was an avid reader, a teetotaller, a teacher from the rural South, and a member of a fundamentalist Christian religious tradition, and the two became friends. Justus first confronted the reality of racial discrimination under Jim Crow laws when the two women were together at the Andrew Jackson Hotel in Nashville and Clark was denied entry to a "white-only" elevator.

In 1959, Justus was called to testify in hearings conducted to investigate alleged subversive activities at the Highlander Folk School. This was part of the campaign by the state of Tennessee that led in 1961 to the state's revoking Highlander's charter and seizing its land and buildings in Monteagle. Asked about her views on black and white people dancing together, she told the committee "I see nothing immoral about it. ... It's a square dance. I can look at television any time and see worse than that." When her interrogator followed up by asking "Don't you know it's against the law for whites and colored to marry in Tennessee?", she replied "Yes, sir, but I didn't know that a square dance was part of a marriage ceremony." He continued with a question about Highlander's charter: "It says here one of your purposes is to train rural and industrial leaders. Have you ever issued any diplomas to rural and industrial leaders that you know of?" Her reply, "I didn't know diplomas were required for rural and industrial leaders," ended her questioning. Because of her outspoken support of Highlander and its efforts to end racism, she offered to resign from membership in the local Presbyterian church where she had taught Sunday school; the minister declined to accept her resignation. Vera McCampbell was fired from her public school teaching job due to the women's association with Highlander.

May Justus died in Tennessee on November 7, 1989. She was buried in Summerfield Cemetery in Grundy County.

== Books ==
Justus wrote about 60 books published between 1927 and 1980, including children's fiction and some poetry. Justus' books for children typically combine traditional folklore with realistic fictional stories. Her characters speak in Appalachian dialect, practice traditional mountain folkways, and often are depicted singing traditional songs. Several of her books include recipes, reproduce the words and musical scores of the songs the characters sing, or provide descriptions of herbal remedies.

Only two of Justus's books for children were set outside Appalachia: New Boy in School (1963) and A New Home for Billy (1966), both of which deal with racial desegregation. New Boy in School tells the story of an African American boy who moves to Nashville from Louisiana and enters an integrated school in Nashville where his is the only brown face in his class. Justus was motivated to write the book by her reactions to her experience with Septima Clark and the whites-only elevator and to the 1957 bombing of Hattie Cotton School, one of five Nashville schools that had been announced to become the city's first integrated elementary schools. Ferrum College professor Tina Hanlon has said that New Boy was "probably the first" book on desegregation to be written for young readers. Late in her life Justus said it was her favorite among her books. A New Home for Billy deals with residential desegregation, telling the story of an African American boy whose family encounters racial discrimination when trying to move to the suburbs from a crowded one-room tenement apartment, but ultimately succeeds in settling in an integrated neighborhood.

=== Bibliography ===
Among Justus' books are:

- Peter Pocket: A Little Boy of the Cumberland Mountains, 1927. Illustrated by Mabel Pugh. Garden City, NY: Doubleday Page. Justus' first book, 127 pages in length, Peter Pocket was described as being about "a young boy's life in the Cumberland Mountains during the early part of this century."
- Gabby Gaffer, 1929
- At the Foot of Windy Low, 1930. Illustrated by Carrie Dudley. New York: P. F. Volland.
- The Other Side of the Mountain, 1931; reprinted in 1935 and 1957.
- Gabby Gaffer's New Shoes, 1935
- Honey Jane, 1935; reprinted in 1946. Illustrated by Charles Smith. Garden City, NY: Junior Books/Doubleday, Doran.
- Near-Side-and-Far, 1936
- Cabin on Kettle Creek, 1941
- Sammy, 1946. Illustrated by Christine Chisholm. Includes the musical score for "There Was a Little Tree".
- Susie, 1947. Illustrated by Christine Chisholm. Includes the musical score for "Lazy Lady".
- Luck for Little Lihu, 1950. Illustrated by Frederick T. Chapman. New York: Aladdin Books. An account of some adventures in the life of a 10-year-old "backwoods boy".
- Children of the Great Smoky Mountains, 1952. Illustrated by Robert Henneberger. New York: E. P. Dutton. A collection of 16 stories.
- Surprise for Peter Pocket, 1955. Illustrated by Jean Tamburine. New York: Holt.
- Use Your Head, Hildy, 1956. New York: Henry Holt.
- The Right House for Rowdy, 1960. Illustrated by Jean Tamburine. New York: Holt, Rinehart.
- New Boy in School, 1963. Illustrated by Joan Balfour Payne. New York: Hastings House.
- A New Home for Billy, 1966. Illustrated by Joan Balfour Payne. New York: Hastings House.
- Eben and the Rattlesnake, 1969. Illustrated by Carol Wilde. Champaign, IL: Garrard Publishing.
- My Lord and I, 1980. Poems.

== Recorded songs ==
Between 1953 and 1961, Guy Carawan made field recordings of May Justus singing ballads and folk songs she had learned in her childhood, including songs from Appalachia and songs that her grandmother had brought with her from England. The Tennessee Folklore Society and Jubilee Community Arts published Carawan's recordings in 2011 on a CD entitled May Justus, The Carawan Recordings.

== Awards and recognitions ==
Justus received the Julia Ellsworth Ford Prize in 1935 and 1936, for Gabby Gaffer's New Shoes and Near-Side-And-Far, respectively. In 1950 she was the recipient of a Boys Club of America Junior Book Award for Luck for Little Lihu. The public library in Monteagle, Tennessee, is named for her.
