= Gay, Lesbian, Bisexual, Transgender and Straight Alliance =

Student organization of the University of North Carolina at Chapel Hill

The Gay, Lesbian, Bisexual, Transgender and Straight Alliance
- Abbreviation: GLBTSA
- Formation: September 1974
- Legal status: Student organization
- Purpose: LGBTIQ
- Headquarters: University of North Carolina at Chapel Hill
- Members: 500+
- Co-Presidents: Jen Fredette, Adryen Proctor
- Website: studentorgs.unc.edu/glbtsa

The Gay, Lesbian, Bisexual, Transgender and Straight Alliance (GLBTSA) of the University of North Carolina at Chapel Hill is the largest LGBTIQ student organization in the Southeastern United States. GLBTSA sponsors the annual Southeast Regional Unity Conference as well as Lambda magazine, the nation's oldest LGBTIQ student publication. The general body holds weekly meetings as well as guest speakers, drag shows, retreats, trips, and service projects. GLBTSA has three additional programs: Colors (monthly discussions), Committee for a Queerer Carolina (activism), and Fruit Bowl (social).

== History ==
=== 1974–1985: Carolina Gay Association (CGA) ===
The Carolina Gay Association was founded by Dan Leonard and others involved with the Duke Gay Alliance and the Human Sexuality Information and Counseling Services (HSICS) at UNC-CH. On February 6, 1974, their trial organization, the Gay Awareness Rap Group, held its first meeting at the university's Newman Catholic Student Center. It met every Monday that spring and was predominately attended by men. In the fall they became recognized as the Carolina Gay Association, having encountered little resistance from administrators. CGA meetings were held on the first Monday of the month in Craig. Consciousness raising groups met each Tuesday evening in the Lutheran Student Center and coffeehouses were held there on some Fridays. The Social Action Committee was formed in 1975 and staged an informational picket when two men were kicked out of the He's Not Here bar in September 1975 for dancing together. In April 1976, the CGA held its first Southeastern Gay Conference with hundreds in attendance, and in August 1976, the CGA printed the first copy of Lambda for "Gay Orientation Week." The organization also met at the gay bar Blueberry Hill in Durham.

=== 1985–1992: Carolina Gay and Lesbian Association (CGLA) ===
On February 13, 1985, the CGA voted to change its name to the Carolina Gay and Lesbian Association to make the name more inclusive of women.

During the 1987–1988 school year, two members of Student Congress, H.F. Watts and David McNeill, led an effort to defund the Carolina Gay and Lesbian Association. They collected more than the 10% of student signatures required to put a referendum on the funding of the CGLA on the spring ballot.

On February 16, 1988, UNC-Chapel Hill students voted 58%–42% against funding the Carolina Gay and Lesbian Association. The referendum was non-binding, however, and only acted as a gauge of student opinion. On April 17, the newly elected Student Congress voted to continue funding the CGLA.

=== 1992–1998: Bisexuals, Gay Men, Lesbians, and Allies for Diversity (B-GLAD) ===
In 1992 the organization changed its name to the Bisexuals, Gay Men, Lesbians, and Allies for Diversity.

=== 1998–2003: Queer Network for Change (QNC) ===
In 1998, B-GLAD changed its name to the Queer Network for Change in an effort to be more inclusive of transgender people.

=== 2002–2010: Gay, Lesbian, Bisexual, Transgender – Straight Alliance ===
Two juniors, Alice Newton and Jon Harper, started the Gay, Lesbian, Bisexual, Transgender – Straight Alliance (GLBT-SA) in the spring of 2002. The focus of GLBT-SA was to promote political activism for LGBTIQ issues on campus and throughout the state. The GLBT-SA eventually replaced the Queer Network for Change, which many believe had lost participation from straight members after it changed its name from B-GLAD.

=== 2010–2012: Gay, Lesbian, Bisexual, Transgender and Straight Alliance (GLBTSA) ===
On April 15, 2010, GLBT-SA voted to officially change its name to the Gay, Lesbian, Bisexual, Transgender and Straight Alliance (though the dash had fallen out of use many months prior). The change was one of many proposed by the Committee on the Future of GLBTSA, which met weekly during the spring semester to prepare for the future of the growing organization. Other notable changes included bringing back the Committee for a Queerer Carolina, expanding the social group Women Loving Women (and renaming it The Fruit Bowl), and giving the presidents of Duke University's Blue Devils United and North Carolina State University's GLBT-Community Alliance honorary, non-voting positions on the GLBTSA Executive Board.

=== 2012–present: Sexuality And Gender Alliance (SAGA) ===
In keeping with this organization's commitment to gender and sexual equality, it decided that the 2012–2013 schoolyear would mark a revolutionary change from the historical name "Gay and Lesbian" to an all-inclusive organization name. SAGA refers especially to Lesbian, Gay, Bisexual, Pansexual, Transgender / Trans*, Queer, Questioning, Intersex, Asexual, and different-gendered populations, as well as other sexual and gender minorities.

== Southeast Regional Unity Conference ==
The Southeast Regional Unity Conference is the largest LGBTIQ conference in the Southeastern United States. It is hosted each spring at the University of North Carolina at Chapel Hill. Originally called the North Carolina Unity Conference, its name was changed in 2005 to the Southeast Unity Conference to reflect the growing geographic diversity of its participants.

Date	Theme	Speakers/Performers	Director(s)	Attendance
April 11–13, 2003	First Unity Conference	Urvashi Vaid, Loree Erickson, Mandy Carter	Trevor Hoppe	120+
March 26–28, 2004	Living Below the Bible Belt: The Experiences of LGBTIQ Southerners	Mab Segrest, Skott Freedman, Erik Himan, Nomy Lamm	Trevor Hoppe	100+
April 1–3, 2005	Queerniversity: Testing Your LGBT-IQ	Suzanne Pharr, Danny Roberts, Mandy Carter, Robyn Ochs, Tranzmission	Trevor Hoppe	
April 7–9, 2006	Unorthodox Union: Connecting the GLBTQ and Faith Communities	Mandy Carter, Rev. Irene Monroe, Staceyann Chin, S. Bear Bergman	Sarah C.	
March 30 – April 1, 2007	Outlawing Orgasm: Sex, Disease, and the Policing of Pleasure	Loretta Ross, Sarwat Rumi, Patrick Califia, Robin Tyler, Andy Marra	Win Chesson	400+
April 4–6, 2008	Are You Being Served?: LGBTIQ Representation in the Media	Kate Bornstein, D’Lo, Mandy Carter, Magdalen Hsu-Li, Ignacio Rivera, Pam Spaulding, Craig Stephens	Robert Wells	400+
April 3–5, 2009	Sweet T: Transgressing, Transforming, and Transcending Gender and Sexuality in the South	Tim'm T. West, Peterson Toscano, Scott Turner Schofield, Micia Mosely	Haley Koch	
April 9–11, 2010	Intersecting Identities: Performance, Politics, Power	Kareem Khubchandani, Rev. Roger Hayes	Kimberly Fisher	
April 1–3, 2011	Breaking Barriers, Building Community	F to Embody, Faisal Alam	Rebecca Lovewell, Matthew McGibney	
March 30 – April 1, 2012	Crossroads: Navigating the Intersections of Our Identities	F to Embody, Abby Dees, Miles Walser	Sydney Borden, Camilla Brewer	200+
April 2–4, 2013	Queering the Nation Together: Creating a Safer, More Welcoming Queer Platform in Your Community	Fabian Romero	Sydney Borden, Camilla Brewer	100+
April 11–13, 2014	LGBT*QIA Doing Health the Right Way: Public Health and Safety in Your Community and on Campus	L.G. Iannotte	Sydney Borden, Camilla Brewer	50+
March 27–29, 2015	LGBT[ranscendence]*QIA: Opening Our Eyes, Expanding Our Horizons	Mark Kleinschmidt, Julia Weldon	Lauren Martin, Emily Chambliss	

=== Previous Conferences ===
The Carolina Gay Association held the first Southeastern Gay Conference at the University of North Carolina at Chapel Hill in 1976. The Second Annual Southeastern Gay Conference was held April 1–3, 1977. In 1978, the conference moved to Atlanta, Georgia. It returned to Chapel Hill in 1979 with over 600 people in attendance.

On March 25–27, 1983, the University of North Carolina at Chapel Hill held the first North Carolina Gay and Lesbian Conference. The theme for the conference was "Survival in a Hostile Environment." The second annual North Carolina Gay and Lesbian Conference was held March 30 – April 1, 1984, at North Carolina State University in Raleigh, North Carolina. In 1985 the Southeastern Gay Conference returned to Chapel Hill for its tenth anniversary. The conference was held April 11–14, 1985, and themed "Here Today and Here to Stay."

== Lambda magazine ==
Started in 1976, Lambda is the oldest LGBTIQ student publication in the United States. It has always been a product of the LGBTIQ student organization at UNC-CH and is currently a semesterly publication of the GLBTSA.

=== Mission statement ===
"LAMBDA is UNC-Chapel Hill's Lesbian-, Gay-, Bisexual-, Transgender-, Intersex- and Queer-affirming publication, providing a progressive outlet for news, analysis, opinion and dialogue. As such, we are inherently committed to a feminist, anti-racist and historically conscious perspective in pursuit of social justice for all people."

=== Awards ===
The Front Page awarded Lambda its 1983 Media Award for "Best Gay Newsletter" in its March 27, 1984, issue. (The Front Page was a North Carolina gay newspaper founded in 1979 that merged with Q-Notes in 2006.)

== Other programs ==
=== Committee for a Queerer Carolina ===
The Committee for a Queerer Carolina is an activist group formed in the spring of 2004 in response to the conservative Committee for a Better Carolina.

=== Fruit Bowl ===
Formerly Women Loving Women (WLW), Fruit Bowl is a weekly social initiative.

=== Cross-Campus Initiatives ===
Since the fall of 2009, GLBTSA has increasingly worked with students at Duke University and North Carolina State University. On February 12–14, 2010, the three universities held a joint retreat at the Chestnut Ridge Camp and Retreat Center in Efland, North Carolina. Another retreat is planned for November 2010.
