= Candie Carawan =

American civil rights activist, singer and author

- Born: Carolanne Marie Anderson; 1939 (age 86–87); Los Angeles, California, U.S.
- Education: Pomona College
- Occupations: Civil rights activist, singer, author
- Years active: 1960–present
- Known for: Highlander Research and Education Center
- Spouse: Guy Carawan (m. 1961; died 2015)
- Children: 2 (including Evan Carawan)

Carolanne Marie "Candie" Carawan (née Anderson) (born 1939) is an American civil rights activist, singer and author known for popularizing the protest song "We Shall Overcome" to the American Civil Rights Movement with her husband Guy Carawan in the 1960s.

== Early life ==
Carawan was born to Howard and Lois Anderson in Los Angeles, California, in 1939. Her father was a petroleum and environmental geologist.

She attended Pomona College and was interested in the civil rights movement. In her junior year, she became an exchange student to Fisk University, a historically black college in Nashville. She said, "I learned about southern black people, racism, nonviolence, police, jail, southern courts; I met brilliant people like James Lawson" She participated in the black students' demonstrations to integrate the schools there. Carawan said "I was really lucky – my mother and father were out of the country. So I didn't have to deal with my parents."

== Highlander Center ==
In March 1960, she attended her first meeting at the Highlander Research and Education Center in New Market, Tennessee to help teach workshops, where she met Guy Carawan. She becomes a founding member of the Student Nonviolent Coordinating Committee (SNCC)

At one point during her career in activism, after two weeks of sit-ins she was arrested and put into jail. While in jail, the guards separated the white women from the black women. "The only connection we had with the others was the music". However, with these sit-ins, she helped contribute to the abolishing of lunch-counter segregation in Nashville. Candie notes how she was "naive" saying "I was sure we would have just a few sit-ins, point out to the nation that there was something wrong, and the world would change." In 1966, the SNCC voted to remove whites from their membership. Candie says SNCC should get more credit for reducing the fear in Mississippi and prompting many people to join the movement.

Carawan moved back to California to finish her senior year in Pomona College and spread the word about what she had learned in the south. She spoke to the Republican Club and even got a professor to be involved in the movement. While in California, she and Guy organized a local protest in support of the Freedom Riders at the local Greyhound bus station. Later in life, Guy and Candie travelled throughout the south, living in Johns Island, South Carolina, Blackey, Kentucky, rural North Carolina, and New York. The two eventually had two children, Evan and Heather. For a portion of the kids' early lives, Guy and Candie toured Europe as folk artists. Since 1966, Guy and Candie have compiled books and albums of their songs from the movement. They have four books published. Ain't You got a Right to the Tree of Life?, We Shall Overcome, Voices from the Mountains, Coal Mining Women, and Sing for Freedom are just a few of the many collections they have created over of the years.

== Personal life ==
She married Guy Carawan in 1961. They have two children: Heather and Evan Carawan. She lives in New Market, Tennessee, where she continues to work with the Highlander Research and Education Center.

== Bibliography ==
- Carawan, Guy; Carawan, Candie (1963). We Shall Overcome!. New York: Oak Publications.
- Carawan, Guy; Carawan, Candie, eds. (1989) [1st pub. : 1966]. Ain't You Got a Right to the Tree of Life?: The People of Johns Island South Carolina―Their Faces, Their Words, and Their Songs. University of Georgia. ISBN 0-8203-1132-4. (photographs by Robert Yellin)
- Carawan, Guy; Carawan, Candie (1968). Freedom is a Constant Struggle. New York: Oak Publications.
- Carawan, Guy; Carawan, Candie (1996) [1st pub. : 1968]. Voices from the Mountains: Life and Struggle in the Appalachian South. University of Georgia Press. ISBN 0-8203-1882-5.
- Carawan, Guy; Carawan, Candie (2008) [1st pub. : 1990]. Sing for Freedom: The Story of the Civil Rights Movement through Its Songs. NewSouth Books. ISBN 978-1588381934. (incorporates We Shall Overcome! and Freedom is a Constant Struggle above)
