= Miles Horton =

Miles Horton may refer to:

- Myles Horton (1905-1990), American educator
- Tim Horton (Miles Gilbert Horton, 1930-1974), Canadian hockey player and restaurant entrepreneur
