= The Long Haul (autobiography) =

1998 autobiography by Myles Horton

The Long Haul, An autobiography
- First edition
- Author: Myles Horton
- Language: English
- Genre: Autobiography
- Publisher: Teachers College, Columbia University
- Publication date: 1998
- Publication place: United States
- Media type: Print (Softcover)
- Pages: 228
- ISBN: 0-8077-3700-3
- OCLC: 37705315
- Dewey Decimal: 374/.9768/78 21
- LC Class: LC5301.M65 H69 1998

The Long Haul is an autobiography of Myles Horton, labor organizer, founder of the Highlander School and perhaps the first practitioner of what would later be called popular education. Highlander used the principles of democratic education - where students were the authorities in the classroom, the teacher is a facilitator, and the focus of education is teaching collective action for social change - to play a key role in the labor movement of the 1930s and the civil rights movement of the 1950s and 1960s. Horton pioneered many of the educational principles Paulo Freire would make famous worldwide in the 1980s.

== Childhood ==
Myles Horton was born to working-class parents in Savannah, Tennessee on July 9, 1905. His parents had been school teachers and manual laborers. While they were poor, they were still slightly more financially secure and better-educated than their neighbors. Horton learned that "the rich were people who lived off of somebody else"; that "education is meant to help you do something for others"; the power of unions; and the importance of loving your neighbor. He cut logs at a sawmill and packed tomatoes; at the latter job he organized a strike action among the other young laborers, winning a small raise. He went on to become a top student and football player in his small, local high school.

== College ==
Horton attended Cumberland University in Lebanon, Tennessee, a small college with few good teachers – a benefit for Horton, who then learned how to educate himself. This also allowed Horton to develop his own ideas rather than simply adopt the ideas of his professors. Here he began studying worker cooperatives, local labor unions and militant working-class organizing. He also became a socialist. He believed that oppressed people had to struggle together to build a new society based on equality. Upon graduating, he worked for the YMCA, where, in 1928, he successfully organized an integrated conference that violated the Jim Crow laws of the time. He also began a discussion group for poor folks in Ozone, Tennessee, a poor, rural community. There Horton pioneered his technique facilitating meetings where poor people talked out their problems and strategized solutions to them.

== Graduate school ==
In 1929 Horton went to Union Theological Seminary in New York City, a radical school at the time. He studied under Reinhold Niebuhr, a Christian philosopher whose teachings on moral behavior in an immoral society helped inspire Horton's thinking on civil disobedience. He read Alexander Hamilton and John Dewey, as well as Marx and Lenin. Horton's New York experience broadened him. Most of his colleagues were from wealthy intellectual families, and some of them helped him logistically or financially in founding Highlander. Horton also attended socialist demonstrations in Manhattan where brutal police crackdowns, together with the dogmatic pacifism of his contemporaries, influenced his nuanced perspective on pragmatic non-violence direct action over uncompromising pacifism.

After finishing at Union Theological Seminary Horton studied at the University of Chicago. He studied firsthand what people were doing about contemporary social problems, such as Hull House, which helped indigent recent immigrants. It was in Chicago that Horton learned how collective action was not just more effective in getting results; it also provided for a superior educational experience. He also learned how important it was to bring diverging views into the open when facilitating conversation within a group. Finally, he learned how important it was for people to have democratic control over their lives, including their schooling – that, in fact, oppressed people's education should be a model for the democratic societies they wanted to create.

== Danish folk schools ==
It was in Chicago that Horton learned about Danish folk schools, a movement from the 1800s that put Horton's principles of democratic education into practice. He traveled to Denmark to study them firsthand. What he saw there – an informal (and beautiful) setting where students and teachers taught each other and learned together; students learning for themselves, and not because they'll be tested; and an education that explicitly sought to create an equal and just society.

== Founding Highlander ==
Upon returning to the US he reunited with his friends from Union Theological Seminary to found the Highlander School in the hills of Tennessee, which brought together what Horton learned from his childhood, formal education, political activity and the Danish folk schools.

They started by leading informal discussion groups among adults in the community on geography, economics, and local union struggles. They also began to learn to see their students' problems from their perspective, and to encourage people who were never taught to value their own opinions to talk and learn together to solve their own problems.

== Highlander and the labor movement ==
Highlander soon started organizing unions in the area and hosting community gatherings, strengthening the political community in the area. Highlander began a more formal labor organizing program for rank-and-file union members to learn to take leadership positions in the union movement. Newly elected labor organizers and shop stewards studied there for six weeks to two months. The school maintained its principles of democratic education of poor people while focusing on a specific social issue – in this case, organizing workers when the government was cracking down on unions – an experience that would prove crucial in Highlander's later work in the civil rights movement.

Highlander was also the only integrated school in the South. They knew it was important to teach union officers not to let bosses play off white workers against black ones. It was also an opportunity to let people learn racial equality by having white and black students study together, almost always for the first time in their lives; their experience at the school prefigured the just society Highlander wanted to create. However, following the purge of much of the left from the labor movement in the late 1940s and early 1950s, labor unions became less interested in restructuring society and more invested in securing concessions from the ruling class. After the Red Scare cut off Highlander from the mainstream of the labor movement, it began to focus more exclusively on promoting racial equality.

== Highlander and the civil rights movement ==
They started by working with African American organizers in the South to promote "Citizenship Schools," where black folks could learn to read and pass voter registration tests. These schools would be a compromise of Highlanders vision of informal education for social justice and African American organizers' understanding of how to best meet the needs of people in their community. Highlander continued training people who wanted to start a Citizenship School, but many more were started by people who'd never been to Highlander. More and more African Americans were organizing for justice in the South. The civil rights movement had begun in earnest.

While the Citizenship School program was eventually passed off to the Southern Christian Leadership Conference under Martin Luther King Jr., Highlander remained a nerve center of the civil rights movement. Activists, including Fannie Lou Hamer, Ella Baker, Rosa Parks, James Bevel, and Bernard Lafayette, participated in Highlander workshops. They talked strategy and studied tactics together, learning from the labor movement and forging their own way forward. Ideas cross-pollinated at Highlander; it's where the song "We Shall Overcome" moved from the labor movement to the civil rights movement. The state of Tennessee ultimately shut down the school on sham charges in 1959. They moved to nearby Knoxville for ten years before creating another permanent school. Highlander continued to organize for racial equality, and later went on to focus on environmental justice and immigrant rights.

== Reception ==
The Long Haul won The Robert F. Kennedy Center for Justice and Human Rights 1991 Book award given annually to a writer who "most faithfully and forcefully reflects Robert Kennedy's purposes - his concern for the poor and the powerless, his struggle for honest and even-handed justice, his conviction that a decent society must assure all young people a fair chance, and his faith that a free democracy can act to remedy disparities of power and opportunity."
