= You Gotta Move =

You Gotta Move may refer to:

- "You Gotta Move" (song), a song by Mississippi Fred McDowell, notably covered by the Rolling Stones
- You Gotta Move (video), a DVD by Aerosmith
- "You Gotta Move", a song by Heatmiser from Mic City Sons

== See also ==
- You Got to Move, a documentary about social change in the American South
