= John Gaventa =

English academic (born 1949)

John Gaventa OBE (born 1949) is currently the director of research at the Institute of Development Studies, University of Sussex, where he has been a Fellow since 1996. From 2011 to 2014, he served as the director of the Coady International Institute and vice-president of International Development at St. Francis Xavier University in Antigonish, Nova Scotia, Canada.

== Education and career ==
Gaventa received his B.A. from Vanderbilt University in 1971, and was a Rhodes Scholar at Oxford. He taught at the University of Tennessee in Knoxville from 1987 until 1996.

He began to help lead a grassroots adult educational program at the Highlander Research and Education Center in New Market, Tennessee, in 1976, and was director from 1993 until 1996. He received a MacArthur Award in 1981 for his work with the Highlander Center. His first publication, Power and Powerlessness: Quiescence and Rebellion in an Appalachian Valley, broke new theoretical and empirical ground in the study of social power, winning the Woodrow Wilson Foundation Book Award of the American Political Science Association, the V.O Key Book Award of the Southern Political Science Association, the Lillian Smith Book Award of the Southern Regiona Council, and the W.D Weatherford Book Award, and earned co-runner-up in the first annual Robert F. Kennedy Book Award competition.

In February 2015, the journal Southern Spaces posted previously unpublished footage recorded by Helen Lewis, John Gaventa, and Richard Greatrex as part of their project to document the cultures of Appalachian and Welsh mining communities in the 1970s.

Gaventa's papers are managed by the Belk Library at Appalachian State University.

== Research on community power ==
While studying at Oxford with Steven Lukes, author of Power: a Radical View (1974), Gaventa developed a theoretical and methodological approach to the study of community power that has radically transformed community power studies in political sociology and opened a path for the legitimization of participatory research in mainstream sociology and political science. The book Global Citizen Action, edited by Gaventa, is one such example. In an essay written for the book, Gaventa writes, "Since the 1970s many activists have heard and been guided by the adage 'think globally, act locally.' These essays would suggest the reverse: Think locally about the impacts of global institutions and global forces." He used this skills to become an activist in and document series of national mining strikes across the United Kingdom, including the 1974 Wales miners' strike.

Borrowing from Lukes, Gaventa identifies three analytical dimensions that are the proper study of social power. Each subsequent dimension is increasingly difficult to empirically observe using traditional political science methodologies, forcing Gaventa to synthesize various understandings of socialization into a cogent articulation of observable processes through which symbolic production is channeled within identifiable networks and communities. The "one-dimensional" approach involves direct empirical observations of openly contested public issues. It involves defining and framing these issues in terms of identifiable winners and losers, and reflects the traditional pluralist approach to the study of community power. The "second dimension" involves the addition of what Gaventa calls the "mobilization of bias", through which cultural hegemony is both asserted and legitimized. This happens through the control of the agenda setting thanks to prior rules. Empirically, Gaventa's contribution is to develop a method for examining the various channels through which those in power transform concerns, claims, and potential challenges about inequitable outcomes into "non-decisions". The "third dimension" therefore adds the capacity to influence expectations about social outcomes by manipulating symbols and ideology so that inequities themselves become "non-issues."

Gaventa's articulation and empirical demonstration of the "three-dimensional" approach to the study of power has informed many disciplines and scholars about the nuances of social power and the processes of its legitimization, while also lending support to scholars and social change advocates who would find the sources and the solutions of social problems not in the dictates or preconceived notions held by social scientists, theologians, and philosophers, but in the narratives of the affected alienated populations. Citizen Action and National Policy Reform opens: "How can ordinary citizens - and the organizations and movements which they engage - make changes in national policies which affect their lives, and the lives of others around them?" This question, which is arguably the central question with which Gaventa is concerned, is answered through the theory Gaventa employs. In Gaventa's theory, methodological subjectivity allows the framing of a social problem, and a social solution, to arise from within the group, thereby empowering and better enabling the group to take collective action in the face of authorities' power to frame issues as non-issues in the public's mind.

Because Gaventa's work draws so heavily upon Luke's "three-face" conception of power, his work has been critiqued by other sociologists and scholars of power. Abraham argues that Michel Foucault's analysis of power identifies a "fourth face" by which power acts, which postulates that, "power itself produces subjects, their interests, their prospects for resistance, and what they consider truth." Abraham writes,"had Gaventa also used the Foucauldian notion of power, then he would perhaps have found even more insights into power’s operations."

== Selected publications ==
Gaventa's publications include:

- Power and Powerlessness: Quiescence and Rebellion in an Appalachian Valley, (1980) ISBN 0-252-00985-1
- We Make the Road by Walking: Conversations on Education and Social Change, ISBN 0-87722-775-6
- Communities in Economic Crisis: Appalachia and the South, ISBN 0-87722-650-4
- Global Citizen Action, ISBN 1-55587-968-3

== Awards and honors ==
Gaventa was appointed Officer of the Order of the British Empire (OBE) in the 2012 Birthday Honours for his services to Oxfam.
