= James A. Dombrowski =

American civil rights advocate (1897–1983)

- Born: January 17, 1897; Tampa, Florida, U.S.
- Died: May 2, 1983 (aged 86); New Orleans, Louisiana
- Education: Union Theological Seminary
- Occupation: Social reformer

James Anderson Dombrowski (January 17, 1897 – May 2, 1983) was an American civil rights activist and Methodist minister. He founded the Highlander Folk School in Tennessee, led the Southern Conference for Human Welfare, and was director of the Southern Conference Educational Fund from 1948 to 1966. A Christian socialist and radical organizer, he was a frequent target of segregationists who accused him of being a Communist. He sued the state of Louisiana in the 1965 Supreme Court case Dombrowski v. Pfister. Dombrowski was ordained as a Methodist minister and earned his PhD from the Union Theological Seminary in New York.

== Early life, war and Emory ==
James Anderson Dombrowski was born in Tampa, Florida, on January 17, 1897. His grandparents had emigrated from Poland and his father was a Lutheran jeweler.

During World War I, he served in the Army Air Service in France. He attended Emory University at its new campus in Atlanta, graduating in 1923 and later serving as alumni secretary for the school. He founded the Sigma Chi chapter at Emory. He undertook graduate studies at the University of California, Berkeley and at Harvard University.

== Union Theological Seminary and organizing ==
By 1929, Dombrowski was ordained in the Methodist ministry. He earned his PhD at Union Theological Seminary in New York City. At the urging of a professor, in 1929 Dombrowski traveled to Elizabethton, Tennessee, to learn about the strike of the rayon mill workers. At a Chamber of Commerce meeting, he spoke in support of the striking workers. He was accused of being a Communist and a dangerous agitator, and was arrested on a murder charge the following day. He was released from jail without being charged. He later spoke at League for Industrial Democracy events about his experiences.

Dombrowski was a Christian socialist and in 1937 he wrote the book The Early Days of Christian Socialism in America. During his career, he advocated for economic justice, the desegregation of schools and the elimination of poll taxes.

With fellow Union Theological Seminary graduate Myles Horton and Don West, he co-founded Highlander Folk School in Tennessee in 1932. He joined the Southern Conference for Human Welfare (SCHW) in 1938. In 1940, Dombrowski was a speaker for the newly formed National Federation for Constitutional Liberties. He left the Highlander Folk School in 1942 and became executive secretary of SCHW until 1946. Dombrowski served as editor for the progressive publication Southern Patriot from 1942 to 1966.

== Southern Conference Educational Fund and later life ==
Dombrowski was executive director of the Southern Conference Educational Fund from 1948 to 1966. The organization was a civil rights advocacy group that promoted desegregation and African-American voting rights. He worked with E. D. Nixon and other key people involved in the Montgomery bus boycott of 1956. As a white progressive from the South, Dombrowski's educational and organizing efforts "prepared the ground" for the civil rights movement.

Dombrowski and SCEF were harassed and came under "bitter and frequent attacks from segregationists". In the early 1960s, SCEF was labeled a Communist front and he was accused under a Louisiana law of violating the Louisiana Subversive Activities and Communist Front Control Law. His documents were seized and he filed a lawsuit against the state along with William Kunstler. The case Dombrowski v. Pfister, was eventually heard by the United States Supreme Court in 1965, which ruled that the Louisiana law in question was unconstitutional.

Dombrowski married Ellen and lived in New Orleans at the Stanton Manor. He died on May 2, 1983, in New Orleans at the Touro Infirmary.

Historian Frank T. Adams wrote a biography of Dombrowski in 1992 entitled James A. Dombrowski: An American Heretic, 1897-1983.
