= Zilphia Horton =

American musician (1910–1956)

- Born: April 14, 1910; Arkansas
- Died: April 11, 1956 (aged 45) Tennessee
- Genres: protest music
- Occupations: musician, ethnomusicologist, labor organizer, activist, teacher
- Instrument: accordion
- Years active: 1935–1956

Zilphia Horton (April 14, 1910 – April 11, 1956) was an American musician, community organizer, educator, Civil Rights activist, and folklorist. She is best known for her work with her husband Myles Horton at the Highlander Folk School where she is generally credited with turning such songs as "We Shall Overcome", "We Shall Not Be Moved," and "This Little Light of Mine" from hymns into protest songs of the Civil Rights Movement.

== Early life ==
Zilphia was born Zilphia Mae Johnson in the coal mining town of Spadra, Arkansas. She was the second child of Robert Guy Johnson and Ora Ermon Howard Johnson. Her father was superintendent of the local coal mine which he later owned and operated, and her mother was a school teacher. While some sources describe her as being of mixed Spanish and Native American heritage, others describe her as white.

== Education and career ==
She was a graduate of the College of the Ozarks University of the Ozarks, where she was trained as a classical musician.

After graduating, Horton was determined to use her talents for the better good of the southern working class. Her political interest was awakened by the Presbyterian minister, Claude C. Williams, who attempted to organize her father's workers for the Progressive Miners' Union. She joined the unionization efforts despite her father's disapproval and was disowned by him as a result.

In 1935, she attended a workshop at the Highlander Folk School, a social justice leadership training school and cultural center located in Monteagle, Tennessee. Horton arrived at Highlander Folk School, now known as the Highlander Research and Education Center, committed to the idea that music and drama could help organize labor. Months after attending her first Highlander workshop, she married the school's founder, Myles Horton, and began working for the Highlander Folk School.

Zilphia Horton had numerous roles at Highlander Folk School, serving as music and drama director from 1938 to 1956. She enhanced the cultural pluralism of the school by developing a curriculum which incorporated and elevated the importance of folk music, dance, and drama. She directed workers' theatre productions, junior union camps, and various community programs; organized union locals; and led singing at workshops, picket lines, union meetings, and fund-raising concerts. She had students collect folk songs, religious music, and union songs around the South, which she then re-wrote or re-worked into protest songs to serve in political struggles, including labor movements and the Civil rights movement.

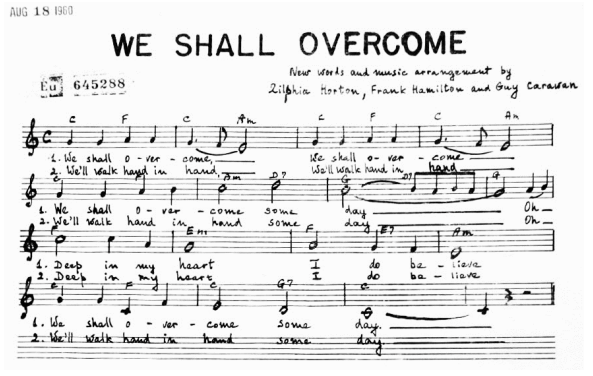
Ludlow 1960 version, with "new words and music arrangement," by Zilphia Horton, Frank Hamilton, and Guy Carawan

She is perhaps best known for teaching Pete Seeger an early version of "We Shall Overcome," which would become an important civil rights anthem of the twentieth century. Originally an old Baptist hymn, "I Will Be All Right," the song came to Highlander from the picket lines of the 1945–1946 Charleston Cigar Factory strike by the South Carolina CIO Food and Tobacco Workers Union in Charleston. Other musicians credited with transforming the song are Frank Hamilton, Guy Carawan, Candie Carawan, and Pete Seeger.

On April 11, 1956, she died after accidentally drinking a glass of typewriter cleaning fluid containing carbon tetrachloride she mistook for water.

== Personal life ==
Zilphia and Myles Horton had two children.

== Legacy ==
Zilphia Horton's papers are deposited in the Tennessee State Library and Archives in Nashville.

A biography, A Singing Army: Zilphia Horton and the Highlander Folk School by Kim Ruehl, was published by University of Texas Press in April, 2021.
