= Blueberry Hill (Durham, North Carolina) =

Defunct gay bar in Durham, North Carolina

- Former names: Blair House Restaurant; Schrafft's Country Inn

General information
- Status: Demolished
- Location: Durham, North Carolina, U.S.

Blueberry Hill was a gay bar in Durham, North Carolina. The building previously housed the Blair House Restaurant and the Schrafft's Country Inn. Blueberry Hill was reportedly the first-known gay bar in the city and was a meeting place for the Carolina Gay Association.

== History ==
Blair House Restaurant likely opened in the late 1950s. It was built along US 15-US 501 between Durham and Chapel Hill and was designed in a Williamsburg-inspired Colonial Revival style. The building featured six dining rooms. H.S. Finley was the restaurant manager. It was referred to as "Schrafft's Country Inn " in The Durham Herald in the 1960s.

In the 1970s, Bruce Derbin opened Blueberry Hill in the building, which is considered by local historians to be Durham's first gay bar. Another gay bar, called Electric Company, opened shortly before in neighboring Chapel Hill. The bar served as a meeting place for the Carolina Gay Association, an LGBTQ student group at the University of North Carolina at Chapel Hill.

The grounds included a small barn to the left of the building, which operated as another bar in the 1970s called Royal Elbow.

Blueberry Hill was demolished sometime between 1977 and 1985. In 1979, Derbin, opened another gay bar, called 42nd Street, at 315 West Main Street in downtown Durham. It was renamed Power Company in 1983.
