= New Market train wreck =

1904 multi-train collision in New Market, Tennessee, United States

Coordinates: 36.079349°N 83.629818°W

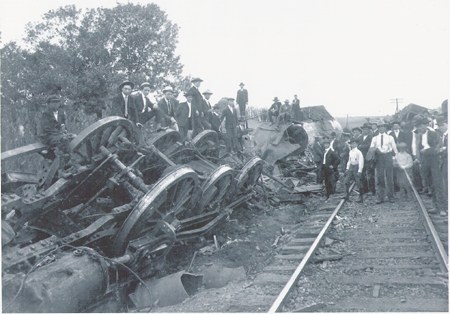
- Photo of wreck

Details
- Date: September 24, 1904; 10:18 am
- Location: Jefferson County, near New Market, Tennessee
- Country: United States
- Operator: Southern Railway
- Incident type: Head-on collision
- Cause: Engineer error

Statistics
- Trains: 2
- Passengers: 350
- Deaths: 56+
- Injured: ~106

The New Market train wreck happened when two Southern Railway passenger trains traveling at great speed collided head on near New Market, Tennessee, on September 24, 1904, killing at least 56 passengers and crew and injuring 106.

== Trains ==
The trains concerned were the No. 15 westbound local passenger train (pulled by 4-4-0 #1838) from Bristol to Knoxville with three cars carrying 140 passengers, and the No. 12 eastbound Carolina Special (pulled by 4-6-0 #1051) from Chattanooga to Salisbury, North Carolina. The line was a single track, and the normal procedure to allow the trains to pass was for the local train to stop on a side track at Hodges' Switch, but when the engineer stopped at Morristown he was given special orders to stop in a siding at New Market instead. Both the conductor and engineer signed that they had read the order, but later the conductor told a reporter that he had 'mis-read' it. After stopping at New Market, the train should have stopped after a few hundred yards onto the side track but it did not.

Meanwhile, the Carolina Special had reached Strawberry Plains; it comprised nine cars: two mail cars, three wooden passenger coaches and four steel Pullman cars. Many of its 210 passengers were returning from the Louisiana Purchase Exposition (St Louis World's Fair). As it drew out of the station a telegraph arrived from New Market; from horrified depot staff it read "Number 15 has run the switch and is on the main line!", but it was too late, despite waving arms and throwing stones at it, no one aboard the Special noticed as the train gathered speed. A telegraph was sent to Hodges' Switch, the normal passing place; but no one was on duty, and the message was never received.

== Collision ==
The trains met on New Market Hill at 10:18 am; the special managed to gather speed on the upgrade and was traveling at 60 mph (97 km/h); the local on the downgrade was trying to make up lost time and attained 70 mph (110 km/h); when they saw each other the emergency brakes were applied, but the trains collided at a combined speed of over 100 mph (160 km/h) (though a contemporary source says 70 mph), and the crash could be heard 15 miles (24 km) away. Both engineers were killed. The locomotive and its coal-tender of the local train were catapulted into the air, turning upside down they flew over the Special's engine, tender and baggage cars, landing on top of the wooden passenger cars which were also struck from behind by the weight of the sturdy steel Pullman cars, which remained relatively undamaged. In seven seconds, the wooden coaches were 'crushed like eggshells'.

Many of the victims were decapitated or horribly mangled; 'splintered timbers, iron, and steel were piled in chaotic masses over the rails, mingling with human bodies'. When news of the crash reached Knoxville, a relief train was organized to bring doctors and medical supplies to the site and take the injured to Knoxville General Hospital. Reporters also managed to board the train, and many photographs of the scene were taken. The official death toll was counted at 56, with 106 injured, though some estimates suggested the death toll could have been over 100.

The inquiry could not determine why the engineer and fireman on the No. 15 had not stopped on the side track at New Market as both were killed by the collision; the engineer may have been asleep.

== Locomotives ==
#1838: This engine pulled Westbound #15. A 4-4-0 American type steam locomotive built by the Schenectady Locomotive Works in 1887 originally as Virginia Midland Railway #692. The engine was later renumbered to 831 in 1894 when the Southern took over the Virginia Midland Railway, then it was renumbered again to 1838 in 1903. When the locomotive collided into Eastbound #12, its boiler broke free from its frames, toppled over the boiler of the Eastbound #12 locomotive, and exploded, completely destroying itself. After the wreck, the engines remains were later collected and sold for scrap. The Southern then replaced this engine with another 4-4-0 (formerly Tennessee Central Railway #9) and renumbered it as its 2nd #1838. It was later sold back to the TCRR in 1909.

#1051: This engine pulled Eastbound #12. A 4-6-0 Ten-Wheeler type steam locomotive built by the Baldwin Locomotive Works in 1897, new for the Southern Railway. After the wreck, the locomotive was later repaired and continued to serve the Southern Railway until it was scrapped at Princeton, Indiana, on June 5, 1930.

== See also ==
- List of train songs
