= New Market Presbyterian Church (New Market, Tennessee) =

Historic church in Tennessee, United States

- U.S. National Register of Historic Places
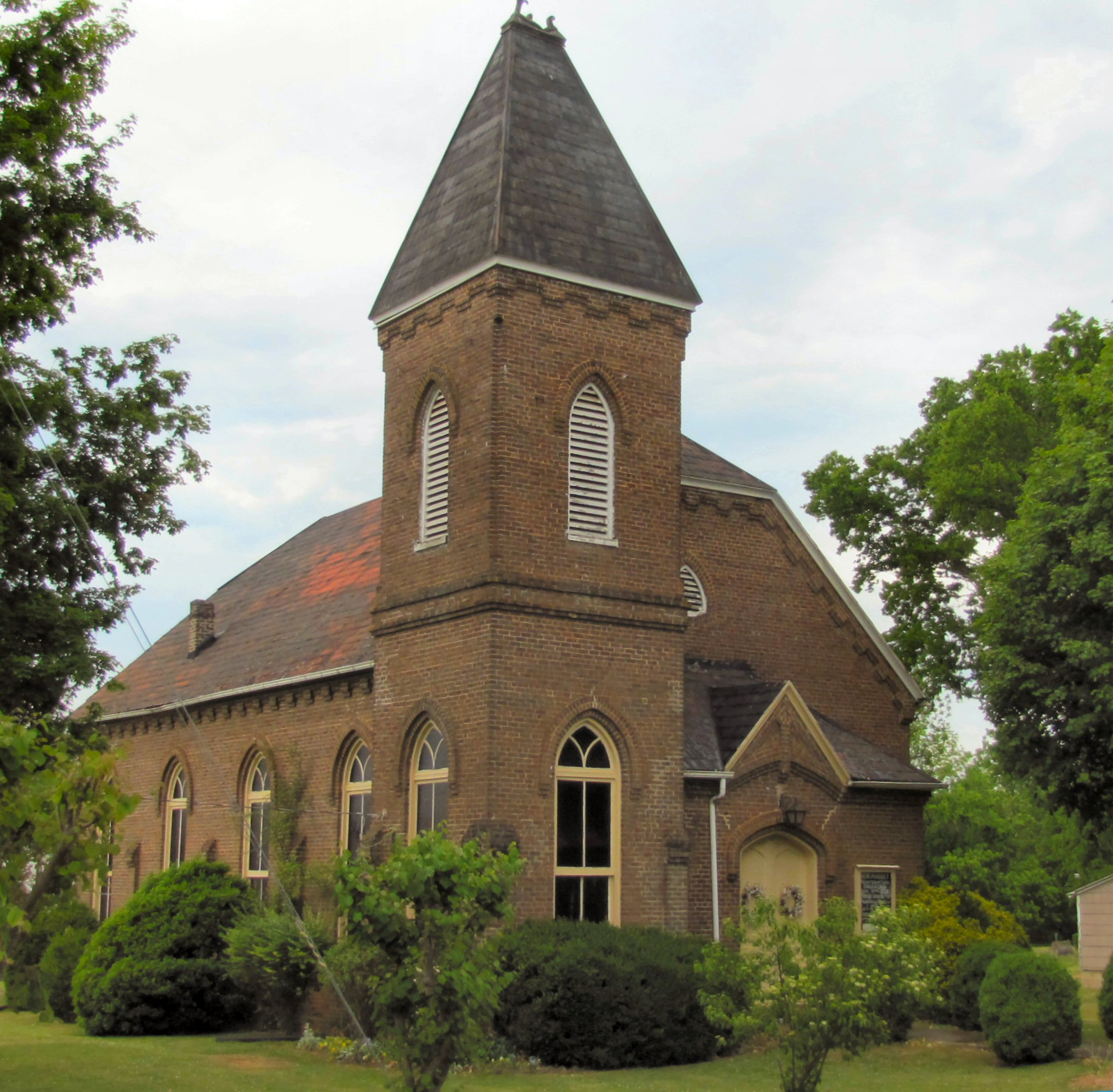

- Location within Tennessee Location within the United States
- Location: 1000 W. Old Andrew Johnson Hwy, New Market, Tennessee
- Coordinates: 36°6′0″N 83°33′7″W
- Area: 0.3 acres (0.12 ha)
- Built: 1885
- Architectural style: Late Gothic Revival
- NRHP reference No.: 98000823
- Added to NRHP: July 01, 1998

New Market Presbyterian Church is a historic church at 1000 W. Old Andrew Johnson Hwy in New Market, Tennessee.

The congregation was formed September 10, 1826, as an off-split from Hopewell Presbyterian Church in Dandridge.

The church building was built in 1885 and added to the National Register of Historic Places in 1998.
