= Suzanne Pharr =

American politician

Suzanne Pharr is an American organizer, political strategist, and author who has worked to build a broad-based social justice movement in the United States. Pharr is the founder of the Women's Project (based in Arkansas), co-founded Southerners on New Ground, a regional progressive LGBT organization, and was the director of the Highlander Center. She organized the "No on Nine" campaign against the passage of Oregon Ballot Measure 9.

Pharr was born in 1939 in Hog Mountain, Georgia, just northeast of Atlanta. She attended colleges in Milledgeville, Georgia, Buffalo, New York, and New Orleans. She received a MA in English from the University at Buffalo, and most of the requirements for the Ph.D. in American literature from Tulane University. From 1977 to 1978, she was director of the Washington County Head Start Program in Fayetteville, Arkansas. In 1988, she co-chaired Jesse Jackson’s presidential campaign in Arkansas. From 1999 to 2004, she served as director for the Highlander Research and Education Center, a historic, civil rights organization based in New Market, Tennessee.

Pharr is the author of the book Homophobia: A Weapon of Sexism (published in 1988 by Chardon Press). Pharr's In the Time of the Right: Reflections on Liberation was published in 1996.

Pharr is active currently with Project South, the Southern Movement Assembly, the Rural Organizing Project, and Grassroots Arkansas.
