= Helen Matthews Lewis =

American sociologist, historian, and activist (1924–2022)

- Born: October 2, 1924; Nicholson, Georgia
- Died: September 4, 2022 (aged 97); Abingdon, Virginia, U.S.
- Occupations: Sociologist, historian, activist

Helen Matthews Lewis (October 2, 1924 – September 4, 2022) was an American sociologist, historian, and activist who specialized in Appalachia and women's rights. She was noted for developing an interpretation of Appalachia as an internal United States colony, as well as designing the first academic programs for Appalachian studies. She also specialized in Appalachian oral history, collecting and preserving the experiences of Appalachian working-class women in their own words. She is known as the "grandmother of Appalachian Studies" as her work has influenced a generation of scholars who focus on Appalachia.

== Early life and education ==
Lewis was born in Nicholson, Georgia, in 1924. Her parents were Hugh and Maurie Matthews, a postal worker and nurse, respectively, and her sister was named JoAnn. She spent her early years in Jackson County, where she witnessed and was affected by Jim Crow racial discrimination. She recalled being laughed at for calling an African-American man "mister." When Lewis was 10, her family moved to Forsyth County, a county that had tried to oust all African-Americans in 1912. Matthews Lewis credits her father for providing a foundation of fairness and caring that later played an impact on her activism.

Lewis attended Tift College, where she studied for a year before taking a year off to work. While there, she began thinking about race and racial relations in the United States, specifically in the South. She returned to school at the Georgia State College for Women, now Georgia College & State University, where she earned a bachelor's degree in 1946. During her studies she attended an interracial program at the Hartford Theological Seminary, where she and other students worked on industrial projects and where they lived in “integrated cooperative housing with people across the country.” The program was sponsored by the YWCA, and laid the foundation for Lewis' enduring interest in working class issues and women's issues. Her time as a graduate student included teaching classes where she navigated an academic system that discriminated against her because she was a woman and the wife of an academic. Furthermore, while at Georgia College and State University, Matthews Lewis was exposed to progressive figures at the time including Presbyterian Minister Charles Jones, a Fellowship of Southern Churchman, which was a progressive organization of the time, as well as with Lucy Randolph Mason who was an organizer for the Congress Industrial Organizations.

While attending Duke University as a graduate student, she met Judd W. Lewis. When Judd Lewis went to the University of Virginia, she went with him and enrolled in a master's degree program in sociology, earning her degree in 1949. Her thesis, "The Woman Movement and the Negro Movement: Parallel Struggles for Rights," links the histories and developments of the women's suffrage movement with the emerging civil rights movement. Following this, the two took jobs at Clinch Valley College in Virginia which had a policy stating that all wives of full-time faculty could not hold full-time positions and so Matthews Lewis was forced to work part time. Lewis earned a PhD in sociology at the University of Kentucky in 1970. Her dissertation was entitled "Occupational Roles and Family Roles: A Study of Coal-Mining Families in Southern Appalachia." Matthews Lewis said “the education process must provide a true understanding of the history and exploitation of the area and a commitment to creative change.”

== Leaving academia and later works ==
In 1976, Matthews Lewis decided to leave formal academia as a result of her struggle with gender policies at various institutions, as well as more recent issues with powerful coal corporations. She started work at the Highlander Research and Education Center, a progressive group which encouraged social justice organizing. While at Highlander, Matthews Lewis focused on “local women’s involvement in community activism” as well as co-edited the handbook, Picking Up the Pieces: Women In and Out of Work in the Rural South, which focused on women's cooperatives and economic education programs. In 1978, Matthews Lewis wrote her first book with Linda Johnson and Donald Askins titled Colonialism in Modern America: The Appalachian Case, looking at the Appalachian Region, specifically the economic and social problems in the area, and what role colonialism played in creating these problems. Her second book Remembering Our Past, Building Our Future focuses on the town of Ivanhoe, Virginia, tracing its history from when the first Europeans arrived to present day, where current citizens are trying to save the town.” Matthews Lewis' third book was published in 1995 and is called It Comes from the People: Community Development and Local Theology. This book looks closely at the community development process and what changes could be implemented to make it better. Most recently, Matthews Lewis alongside Monica Appleby released Mountain Sisters: From Convent to Community in Appalachia in 2003. The book covers the previously unknown Glenmary Sisters and their history of fighting for social justice against the church.

== Personal life and death ==
Lewis died in Abingdon, Virginia, on September 4, 2022, at the age of 97.

== Academic career ==
- University of Virginia, director of Bureau of Population and Economic Research: 1949–1952
- University of Virginia, Wise, part-time instructor and part-time librarian, 1955–1967; professor: 1969–1977
- East Tennessee State University, 1967–1969

== Activism and independent scholarship ==
- Highlander Research and Education Center, education staff: 1977–1980, 1985–1993, 1995–1997; director: 1978–1979
- Appalshop, director of Appalachian history film project: 1980–1984
- National Academy of Sciences, member of committee on underground coal mine safety: 1980
- Berea College, director of Appalachian Center: 1993–1995

== Publications ==
- Colonialism in Modern America: The Appalachian Case, Appalachian Consortium Press, 1978, with Linda Johnson and Donald Askins
- Remembering Our Past, Building Our Future, Ivanhoe Civic League, 1990, with Suzanne O'Donnell
- It Comes from the People: Community Development and Local Theology, Temple University Press, 1995, with Mary Ann Hinsdale and Maxine Waller
- Mountain Sisters: From Convent to Community in Appalachia, University Press of Kentucky, 2003, with Monica Appleby

== Awards and honors ==
- W.D. Weatherford Award, Berea College, 1990, for Remembering Our Past, Building Our Future
- Helen M. Lewis Community Service Award, for 'shaping the field of Appalachian Studies' https://www.appalachianstudies.org/awards
- Honorary Doctorate of Letters, Emory and Henry College, 1999
- Honorary Doctorate of Divinity, Wake Forest University, 2000
