= Guy Carawan =

American musician and musicologist

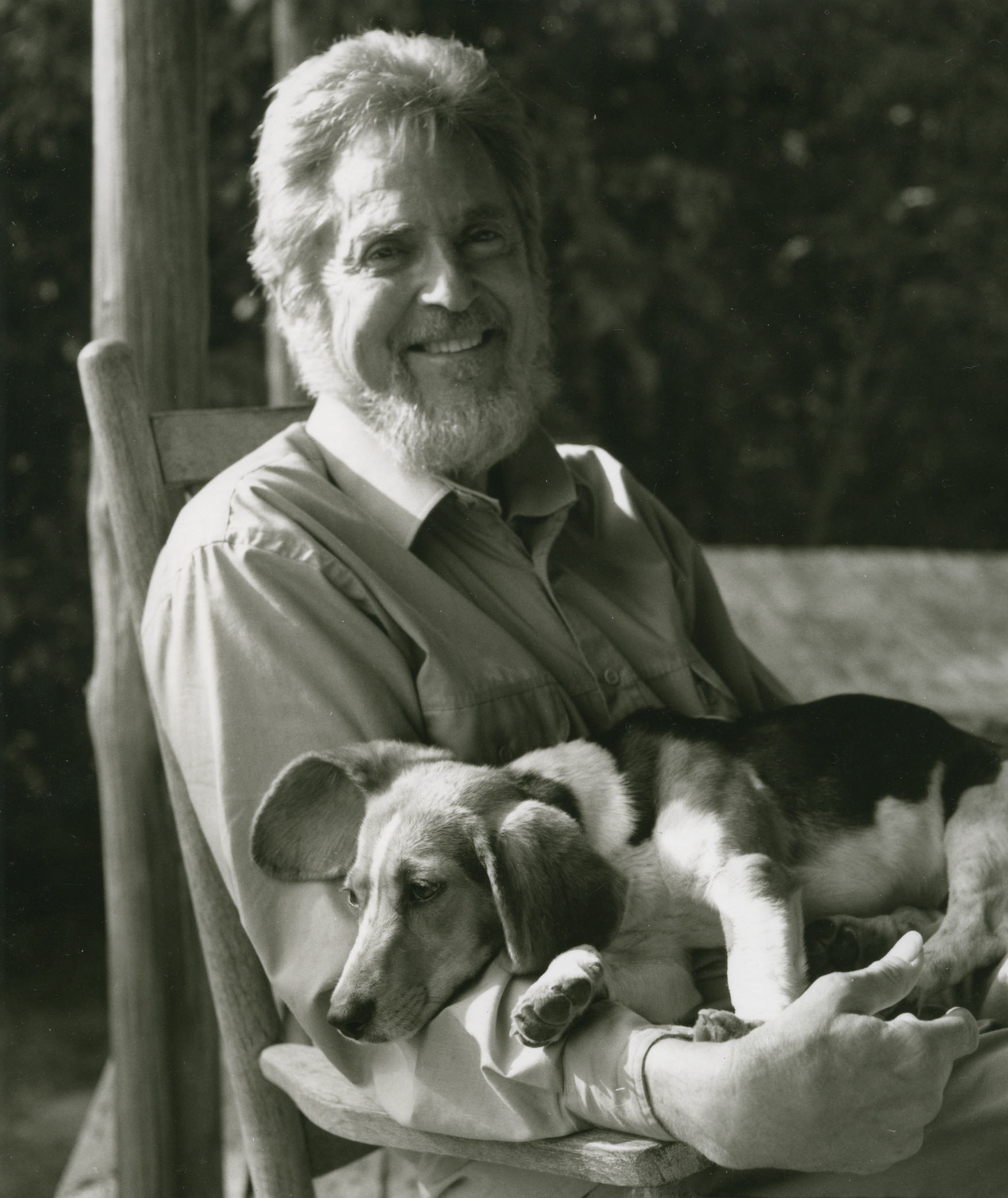
- Guy Carawan, ca. 1990

Background information
- Born: Guy Hughes Carawan Jr. July 28, 1927; Los Angeles
- Died: May 2, 2015 (aged 87) New Market, Tennessee
- Genres: Folk music
- Occupations: Folk musician, musicologist
- Instruments: Guitar, banjo, hammered and Appalachian dulcimers, recorder
- Years active: 1950–2015

Guy Hughes Carawan Jr. (July 28, 1927 – May 2, 2015) was an American folk musician and musicologist. He served as music director and song leader for the Highlander Research and Education Center in New Market, Tennessee.

Carawan is best known for introducing the protest song "We Shall Overcome" to the American Civil Rights Movement, by teaching it to the Student Nonviolent Coordinating Committee (SNCC) in 1960. A union organizing song based on a black spiritual, it had been a favorite of Zilphia Horton (d. 1956) wife of the founder of the Highlander Folk School. Carawan reintroduced it at the school when he became its new music director in 1959. The song is copyrighted in the name of Horton, Frank Hamilton, Carawan and Pete Seeger.

Carawan sang and played banjo, guitar, and hammered dulcimer. He frequently performed and recorded with his wife, singer Candie Carawan. The couple had two children, Evan Carawan and Heather Carawan. Occasionally Guy was accompanied by their son Evan Carawan, who plays mandolin and hammered dulcimer.

== Early life ==
Carawan was born in California in 1927, to Southern parents. His mother, from Charleston, South Carolina, was the resident poet at Winthrop College (now Winthrop University) in Rock Hill, South Carolina, and his father, a veteran of World War I from North Carolina, worked as an asbestos contractor. He described his parents: "He was a poor farm boy and she was a Charlestonian blue blood". He earned a bachelor's degree in mathematics from Occidental College in 1949 and a master's degree in sociology from UCLA.

Through his friend Frank Hamilton, Carawan was introduced to musicians in the People's Songs network, including Pete Seeger and The Weavers. Moving to New York City, he became involved with the American folk music revival in Greenwich Village in the 1950s.

== Career at Highlander Center ==
Carawan first visited the Highlander Folk School in 1953, with singers Ramblin' Jack Elliot and Frank Hamilton. At the recommendation of Pete Seeger, he returned in 1959 as a volunteer, taking charge of the music program pioneered by Zilphia Horton, who had died in an accident in 1956.

As Carawan explained his securing the Highlander position:

"I called Myles; I'd met him before. He said Highlander needed a musical director. My job would be to help get people singing and sharing their songs. When someone began to sing, I'd back them up softly on my guitar so they'd get courage and keep going. Sometimes in sharing a song, people find bonds between themselves that they never knew they had. I can't tell you how many pictures I have of myself standing behind other people, accompanying them on the guitar. I took the job, just for a year − that was thirty years ago"

According to his wife Candie, one of Guy's most important roles during the Civil Rights Movement — more so than introducing "We Shall Overcome" as a Freedom Song — was his desire to record and archive the evolution of the movement through song. Both Carawans believed that the political use of religious and folk music could shape movements and influence people to take action in social change. His initiative to record and preserve the already established Freedom Songs within the movement was intended to inspire and to educate future leaders and activists.

As explained by Movement leader Rev. C. T. Vivian, an associate of Martin Luther King Jr.:

I don't think we had ever thought of spirituals as movement material. When the movement came up, we couldn't apply them. The concept has to be there. It wasn't just to have the music but to take the music out of our past and apply it to the new situation, to change it so it really fit. ... The first time I remember any change in our songs was when Guy came down from Highlander. Here he was with this guitar and tall thin frame, leaning forward and patting that foot. I remember James Bevel and I looked across at each other and smiled. Guy had taken this song, "Follow the Drinking Gourd" – I didn't know the song, but he gave some background on it and boom – that began to make sense. And, little by little, spiritual after spiritual began to appear with new words and changes: "Keep Your Eyes on the Prize, Hold On" or "I'm Going to Sit at the Welcome Table". Once we had seen it done, we could begin to do it.

At Highlander's April 1956 workshop, Carawan had met Candie Anderson, an exchange student at Fisk University in Nashville, from Pomona College in California. She was one of the first white students to participate in the sit-in movement. As a couple they traveled the south hosting workshops to influence people to embrace in the Civil Rights Movement's music. They also travelled the world influencing activists. They visited England and attended the World Festival of Youth and Students in the Soviet Union in 1957, continuing onward to the People's Republic of China. The couple married in March 1961.

Guy and Candie Carawan lived in New Market, near the Highlander Center.

Guy remained the musical director at Highlander till his retirement in the late 1980s.

The Guy and Candie Carawan Collection (1955–2010) is located in the Southern Folklife Collection of the Wilson Library of the University of North Carolina at Chapel Hill.

== Bibliography ==
- Carawan, Guy; Carawan, Candie (1963). We Shall Overcome!. New York: Oak Publications.
- Carawan, Guy; Carawan, Candie, eds. (1989) [1st pub. : 1966]. Ain't You Got a Right to the Tree of Life?: The People of Johns Island South Carolina―Their Faces, Their Words, and Their Songs. University of Georgia. ISBN 0-8203-1132-4. (photographs by Robert Yellin)
- Carawan, Guy; Carawan, Candie (1968). Freedom is a Constant Struggle. New York: Oak Publications.
- Carawan, Guy; Carawan, Candie (1996) [1st pub. : 1968]. Voices from the Mountains: Life and Struggle in the Appalachian South. University of Georgia Press. ISBN 0-8203-1882-5.
- Carawan, Guy; Carawan, Candie (2008) [1st pub. : 1990]. Sing for Freedom: The Story of the Civil Rights Movement through Its Songs. NewSouth Books. ISBN 978-1588381934. (incorporates We Shall Overcome! and Freedom is a Constant Struggle above)

== Discography ==
Documentary Recording Projects

- May Justus, The Carawan Recordings, summer 1953, Horton living room in Monteagle, TN; 1961 at May's Summerfield home. Recorded by Guy Carawan; published in 2011 by Tennessee Folklore Society and Jubilee Community Arts
- Nashville Sit-In Story. Folkways Records, FH#5590, 1960. Recorded by Guy Carawan, assisted by Mel Kaiser at Cue Studio.
- Hamper McBee, Cumberland Moonshiner. Prestige Records, 1965. Recorded by Guy Carawan in Knoxville, TN, April 6, 1962.
- Freedom in the Air: Albany Georgia, 1961–62. SNCC #101. Produced by Vanguard Records for the Student Nonviolent Coordinating Committee. Recorded by Guy Carawan. Produced by Guy Carawan & Alan Lomax.
- We Shall Overcome, Songs of Freedom Riders and the Sit-Ins. Folkways Records, FH#5591, 1963. Includes Nashville Quartet and Montgomery Trio. Recorded in New York City.
- Birmingham, Alabama, 1963. Mass Meeting. Folkways Records, FD#5487, 1980. Includes Martin Luther King Jr., Ralph Abernathy, Birmingham Movement Choir. Recorded by Guy Carawan in Birmingham, AL.
- The Story of Greenwood, Mississippi. Folkways Records, FD#5593, 1965. Includes Bob Moses, Fannie Lou Hamer, Medgar Evers, Dick Gregory. Recorded by Guy Carawan in Greenwood, MS.
- Sea Island Folk Festival: Moving Star Hall Singers. Folkways Records, FS#3841, 1966. Includes Alan Lomax speaking at festival. Recorded and produced by Guy & Candie Carawan.
- Been in the Storm So Long: Spirituals, Shouts, Folk Tales and Children's Songs of Johns Island, South Carolina. Folkways Records, FS#3842, 1967. Recorded and produced by Guy & Candie Carawan.
- Earl Gilmore: From the Depths of My Soul. June Appal Recordings, JA0022, 1967. Produced and edited by Guy Carawan for June Appal Recordings. Includes Rupert Oysler on harmonica. Recorded by Jack Wright and Jeff Kiser.
- Come All You Coal Miners. Rounder Records, #4005, 1974. Includes Nimrod Workman, Sarah Gunning, George Tucker, Hazel Dickens. Recorded by Roger and Lucy Phenix at Appalachian Music Workshop at Highlander Center, October 1972. Produced by Guy Carawan.
- George Tucker, Kentucky Coal Miner. Rounder Records, #0064, 1975. Collected and recorded by Guy Carawan in Beaver, KY.
- China: Music from the Peoples' Republic. Rounder Records, #4008, CD, 1976. Recorded in China by Guy and Candie Carawan.
- Sing for Freedom, Southwide Workshop. Folkways Records, FD#5488, 1980. Produced by Guy & Candie Carawan, Highlander Center. Recorded at the Gammon Theological Seminary in Atlanta, GA, at a workshop with Freedom Singers, Birmingham Movement Choir, Georgia Sea Island Singers, Doc Reese, Phil Ochs, and Len Chandler.
- They'll Never Keep Us Down: Women's coal mining songs. Rounder Records, #4012, 1983. Includes Hazel Dickens, Sarah Gunning, Florence Reece, Phyllis Boyens, Reel World String Band. Dedicated to Sarah Gunning who died November 14, 1983. Produced by Guy & Candie Carawan for Rounder.
- Sing for Freedom. Smithsonian Folkways, SF#40032, CD, 1990. A compilation of material from the six LPs. Selected by Guy & Candie Carawan.
- Been in the Storm So Long. Smithsonian Folkways, SF#40031, CD, 1990. A compilation of material from the two LPs. Selected by Guy & Candie Carawan.
- Coal Mining Women. Rounder Records, #4025, CD, 1997. Selections from two previous coal LPs. Conceived and selected by Guy and Candie Carawan.

Personal Recordings

- Songs with Guy Carawan, vol. 1, Folkways Records, FG 3544, 1958.
- Mountain Songs & Banjo Tunes, Topic Records U.K., 10T24, 10" LP 1958
- Guy Carawan Sings: Something Old, New, Borrowed and Blue, Folkways Records, FG 3548, 1959.
- This Little Light of Mine, Folkways Records, FG 3552, 1959.
- The Best of Guy Carawan, Prestige International, #13013, 1961.
- A Guy Called Carawan, E.M.I. Records, Middlesex, England, SX 6065, 1965.
- Freedom Now! Songs for a New America (with Candie Carawan), Plane Records, Germany, #55301, 1968.
- The Telling Takes Me Home, Cur Non Records, cnl 722, 1972.
- Sitting on Top of the World & Mountain Songs (double album), Intercord Xenophon, Germany, Int. 181.012, 1974.
- Sitting on Top of the World, American version (with Candie Carawan), self-produced, 1975.
- Green Rocky Road, June Appal Recordings, JA 0021, 1976.
- Jubilee, June Appal Recordings, JA 0029, 1979.
- Songs of Struggle and Celebration, Flying Fish Records, FC 27272, 1982.
- My Rhinoceros and Other Friends, (children's songs), A Gentle Wind, GW 1023, 1983.
- High on a Mountain, self-produced (cassette only), 1984.
- Hammer Dulcimer Music (with Evan Carawan), Flying Fish Records, FF 329, 1984.
- The Land Knows You're There, Flying Fish Records, FF 391, 1986.
- Old Blue & Other Favorites, self-produced (cassette only), 1990.
- Tree of Life (Arbol de La Vida), Flying Fish Records, FF 525, 1990.
- Homebrew (The Carawan Family), Flying Fish Records, FF 609, 1992.
- Sparkles & Shines, Ponder Productions, 1999.

Included on Albums with Others

- Several albums released in England in the late 1950s, including America at Play with Peggy Seeger.
- Songs for Peace, Folk Freak Records, FF 4010, 1983.
- I'm Gonna Let it Shine: A Gathering of Voices for Freedom, Round River Records, RRR 401, 1990.
- Freedom is a Constant Struggle: Songs of the Mississippi Civil Rights Movement, Folk Era, FE 1419, 1994.
- Die Burg Waldeck Festivals 1964–1969 - Chanson Folklore International, 10-CD box, Bear Family Records, BCD 16017 JC, 2008
- Classic Protest Songs from Smithsonian Folkways, Smithsonian Folkways Recordings, SFW40197, 2009.

== Video references ==
- We Shall Overcome, Ginger Group Productions, 1988; PBS Home Video 174, 58 min. Pete Seeger, Bernard Lafayette, Julian Bond, and Bernice Johnson Reagon comment on Guy Carawan's role in teaching the song "We Shall Overcome."
- The Telling Takes Me Home, Heatcar Productions <heatcar productions | Video Production, Editing and Media Education>, 2005; produced, directed and edited by Heather Carawan, 29 min. Music and memory tell the story of Guy and Candie Carawan, activists and folk singers who have carried their work from the deep south of the Civil Rights Movement into today's daunting struggle for peace. Interweaving past and present, the filmmaker integrates her own reflections on growing up in a rich musical and political landscape with her parents' views on race relations, community organizing, and the sustaining power of song.
