= Dombrowski v. Pfister =

- Supreme Court of the United States

Argued January 25, 1965 Decided April 26, 1965
- Full case name: Dombrowski, et al. v. Pfister, Chairman, Joint Legislative Committee on Un-American Activities of the Louisiana Legislature, et al.
- Citations: 380 U.S. 479 (more) 85 S. Ct. 1116; 14 L. Ed. 2d 22; 1965 U.S. LEXIS 1351

Holding
- A court may enjoin enforcement of a statute that is so overbroad in its prohibition of unprotected speech that it substantially prohibits protected speech — especially if the statute is being enforced in bad faith.

Court membership
- Chief Justice Earl Warren Associate Justices Hugo Black · William O. Douglas; Tom C. Clark · John M. Harlan II; William J. Brennan Jr. · Potter Stewart; Byron White · Arthur Goldberg

Case opinions
- Majority: Brennan, joined by Warren, Douglas, White, Goldberg
- Dissent: Harlan, joined by Clark
- Black and Stewart took no part in the consideration or decision of the case.

Laws applied
- U.S. Const. amend. I

Dombrowski v. Pfister, 380 U.S. 479 (1965), was a landmark United States Supreme Court case brought forth by Dr. James Dombrowski along with William Kunstler, founder of the Center for Constitutional Rights, against the governor of Louisiana, law enforcement officers, and the chairperson of the state's Legislative Joint Committee on Un-American Activities for prosecuting or threatening to prosecute his organization under several state subversion statutes.

== Background ==
James A. Dombrowski was executive director of the Southern Conference Education Fund (SCEF), a civil rights advocacy group that promoted desegregation and African-American voting rights. State officials in Louisiana declared the SCEF a subversive or communist-front organization whose members were violating the Louisiana Subversive Activities and Communist Front Control Law. Louisiana officials seized and searched Dombrowski's and two lawyers’ papers and indicted them.

Dombrowski alleged that members of his organization, which consisted of a group of Southern liberals dedicated to fighting for civil rights for Blacks in the South, were subjected to continuous harassment, including arrests without intent to prosecute, and seizures of necessary internal documents. Furthermore, the State was threatening to use anti-subversion statutes to prosecute the organization.

The case was brought forth by Dombrowski after he was arrested and his offices were raided by authorities in October 1963. Dombrowski demanded all seized materials to be returned to him and $500,000 be paid in damages resulting from the arrest and search-and-seizure. However, a three-judge Federal district court dismissed the claim, stating that Dombrowski had failed to show evidence of irreparable damage and asserted the abstention doctrine, stating that State Courts had the right to refrain from ruling in Constitutional questions.

== Decision ==
The Supreme Court overturned the earlier dismissal of the court below, making note of the "chilling effect" the ruling below would have had on First Amendment rights. Federal courts ordinarily should abstain from interfering in state litigation, even when constitutional issues are involved, according to the Supreme Court. They may intrude when a statute substantially chills free expression through overbroad application and when parties challenge a statute facially. Furthermore, when a statute is substantially overbroad, persons may challenge the entire statute and not just those aspects that apply to them. The Court found the Louisiana statutes to be void on their face and ordered the district court to grant the requested relief.

== Status as precedent ==
Several years later, the Supreme Court decided in Younger v. Harris (1971) that existed a "national policy forbidding federal courts to stay or enjoin pending state court proceedings except under special circumstances." The Court specifically distinguished Dombrowski, stating that the holding of that case was merely a limited exception to the general rule forbidding the enjoining of state court proceedings. The Court stated that it was appropriate for a federal claim to go forward in Dombrowski because the consistent pattern of bad faith prosecutions denied the claimant the opportunity to pursue his constitutional challenge to anti-subversion statutes in state court. Moreover, the Younger Court asserted that the bare existence of a chilling effect as in Dombrowski was insufficient to justify enjoining state proceedings, without more.

The Supreme Court in Younger conceded that bad faith prosecution like the pattern in Dombrowski would justify a federal court in issuing an injunction against state proceedings. However, since the announcement of Younger in 1971, the Supreme Court has never found an instance of alleged bad faith prosecution to, in fact, meet the requirements of this exception to the no-injunction rule. As the commentator Erwin Chemerinsky stated, the bad-faith prosecution exception seems narrowly limited to facts like those in Dombrowski. Other scholars have even asserted that the possible range of cases that would fit the Dombrowski model and allow an exception to the no-injunction rule is so limited as to be an "empty universe."
