= Magdalen Hsu-Li =

American singer-songwriter

- Born: Rochelle Li; 1970 (age 55–56); Martinsville, Virginia, U.S.
- Education: Rhode Island School of Design; Cornish College of the Arts; Berklee College of Music
- Occupations: Singer-songwriter; speaker; writer; painter; cultural activist
- Years active: 1997–present
- Musical career
- Genres: Pop; rock; folk; alternative
- Instruments: Vocals; piano; guitar; percussion
- Label: Alternative pop
- Website: www.MagdalenHsuLi.com

Magdalen Hsu-Li (born Rochelle Li; 1970) is an American singer-songwriter, painter, speaker, writer and cultural activist. She is also a Doctor of Acupuncture and Chinese Medicine.

== Biography ==
Hsu-Li was born in the southern city of Martinsville, Virginia to Chinese immigrant parents. She began piano lessons at age 8 but was mainly interested in painting in her early years. She has spoken about growing up with Tourettes.

She attended college at the Rhode Island School of Design where she won accolades including the Florence Leif Award for Excellence in Painting, the Talbot Rantoul Scholarship and the Chicago Institute of the Arts Oxbow Fellowship. After graduating, she moved to Seattle, Washington, and discovered a passion for music over visual art. She matriculated at the Cornish College of the Arts, where she studied classical music and jazz and won a music scholarship in 1995. In 2008, she graduated summa cum laude from Berklee College of Music with a Bachelor of Music.

== Performance and recordings ==
She began performing publicly in 1996 and released her first album, Evolution, on her own Chickpop Records label in 1998. Her second album, Fire, was released in 2001 and was named one of Performing Songwriter magazine's top 12 DIY albums of the year, and best producer at the Outvoice Music Awards. Her song "As I am" was included on Performing Songwriter's ninth compilation album in 2003. Her third album, Smashing The Ceiling, was released in 2005 and had performances by the drummer Matt Chamberlain, the violinist Eyvind Kang and the guitarist Timothy Young. While attending Berklee she was a piano principal in the songwriting Department, and a recipient of the Berklee Achievement Scholarship and Jack Maher Scholarship for Excellence in songwriting. She is a multi-instrumentalist who writes most of her songs and tours with her partner Greane.

== Music ==
Hsu-Li's music can be considered derivative of alternative rock, pop, folk and jazz and is described as having "vocals comparable to Tori Amos and Alanis Morissette and music at times reminiscent of Ani DiFranco's solo albums and other times of percussion-driven Rusted Root."

Hsu-Li describes her music as "pop rock alt folk singer-songwriter music with a tinge of country, jazz, and punk."

== Reception ==
Hsu-Li's music has been described as "exquisitely furious, beautiful, and exciting" by The New York Times, and "an achingly gorgeous collection of piano-based rock recalling the finest moments of Tori Amos or Ben Folds Five" by Yolk magazine. Curve magazine called her music a sumptuous feast for the ears. "A Magazine" wrote, "her blend of hard-grounded folk and sweet siren lyrics makes an enduring impression upon the American music scene her distinguishing factor is her cool, edgy, sound and courage to be sensitive, tender, and feminine. As she carves her identity as an artist in an industry where Asian women are not thought of as musical powerhouses or innovators - Magdalen is a rare force with which to reckon."

About Fire, the Advocate wrote, "finely crafted, melodic, piano-based songs that borrow equally from pop, folk, jazz, blues and even punk."

=== Discography ===
With ChickPop Records

- 1997 Muscle and Bone (EP)
- 1998 Evolution
- 2001 Fire
- 2005 Smashing the Ceiling

== Medicine ==
In the mid-1990s, Hsu-Li experienced chronic laryngitis. She attended an acupuncturist and was able to return to singing. She continued with treatment and decided to train in the area. In the 2020s, she treats patients in Rhode Island.

== Family ==
Hsu-Li has one child with musician Greane (Adam Dias).
