= Highlander Research and Education Center =

American activist school founded in 1932

- where radical visions become a reality.

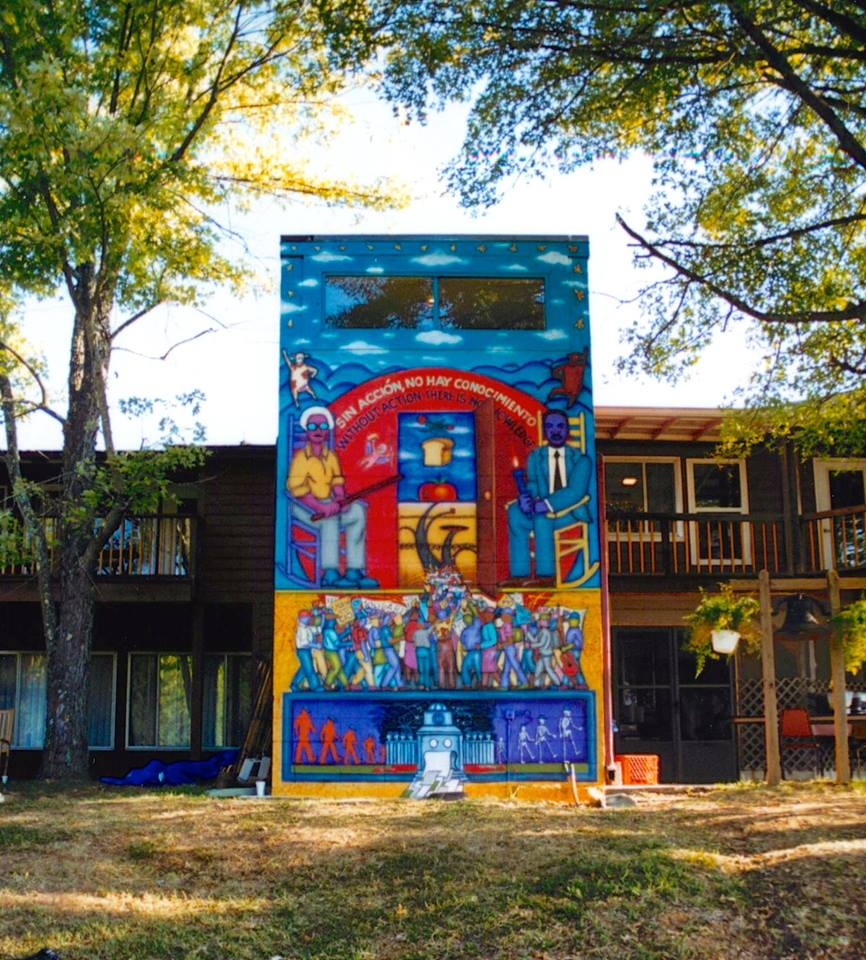
- Education building with mural by Mike Alewitz
- Abbreviation: HREC
- Established: 1932; 94 years ago
- Founders: Myles Horton, Don West, & James A. Dombrowski,
- Type: Labor school, conference center
- Location(s): 1959 Highlander Way; New Market Tennessee 37820
- Coordinates: 36.0407°N 83.5848°W
- Origins: Depression era labor movement, Civil rights movement
- Region served: American South, Appalachia, & beyond
- Services: Facility rentals, library
- Methods: Training, leadership development
- Fields: Labor, social justice
- Website: highlandercenter.org
- Formerly called: Highlander Folk School, Highlander the Movement School

The Highlander Research and Education Center, formerly known as the Highlander Folk School, is a social justice leadership training school and cultural center in New Market, Tennessee. Founded in 1932 by activist Myles Horton, educator Don West, and Methodist minister James A. Dombrowski, it was originally located in the community of Summerfield in Grundy County, Tennessee, between Monteagle and Tracy City.

Highlander has provided education to labor and political leaders throughout the American South, Appalachia, and the world. Highlander's earliest contributions were to the Depression era labor movement. During the mid-to-late 1950s, it played a critical role in the American Civil Rights Movement, for example, training Rosa Parks prior to her historic role in the Montgomery bus boycott. The school taught many other movement activists including Southern Christian Leadership Conference (SCLC) founders Martin Luther King Jr. and Ralph Abernathy, and future Student Nonviolent Coordinating Committee (SNCC) members Septima Clark, Anne Braden, James Bevel, Hollis Watkins, Bernard Lafayette, John Lewis, and Julian Bond. Soon after attending Highlander, Bevel, Lafeyette, and Lewis, along with Diane Nash, founded the Nashville Student Movement.

Backlash against Highlander's civil rights work led to the school's closure by the state of Tennessee in 1959. The staff reorganized and moved to Knoxville, where they rechartered the school under the name "Highlander Research and Education Center." Since 1971 it has been located in New Market. The school was featured in the 1937 short film, People of the Cumberland, and the 1985 documentary, You Got to Move. Much of its history was recorded in the book Or We'll All Hang Separately: The Highlander Idea by Thomas Bledsoe. Highlander's archives reside in the Wisconsin Historical Society and in the Louis Round Wilson Library at the University of North Carolina at Chapel Hill.

== History ==
=== Early years ===
The Highlander Folk School was originally established in Grundy County, Tennessee, on land donated by educator Lilian Wyckoff Johnson. When the school was founded in 1932, the U.S. was in the midst of the Great Depression. Workers in all parts of the country, especially in the South, were met with major resistance by employers when they tried to organize labor unions. Against that backdrop, Myles Horton, Don West, and James Dombrowski created the Highlander Folk School "to provide an educational center in the South for the training of rural and industrial leaders, and for the conservation and enrichment of the indigenous cultural values of the mountains."

Myles Horton, co-founder of Highlander Folk School

Horton was influenced by observing rural adult education schools in Denmark started in the 19th century by Danish Lutheran Bishop N. F. S. Grundtvig. Grundtvig's model shaped Highlander's interactive, community‑based teaching style. During the 1930s and 1940s, the school's main focus was labor education and the training of labor organizers. One of Highlander's first major involvements in civic organizing was its support for coal miners on strike at in Wilder, Tennessee, in 1932, during which a violent conflict drew national attention and helped to shape labor-organizing priorities for the school moving forward. Highlander played a major role in the ongoing Southern labor struggles of the period, offering training for textile workers, miners, and other industrial laborers. The school worked with Congress of Industrial Organizations (CIO) unions and partnered with local labor groups involved in interracial organizing. Among its first teachers was the radical activist and author Myra Page. Highlander's cultural program was developed and led in its early years by Zilphia Johnson (later Zilphia Horton), who used music, theater, and folk culture as educational tools for organizing. Her workshops taught songs and dramas organizers could use to train participants on collective action. This program became a major contributor to the school's popular education approach.

From 1938 to 1953, Highlander ran a nursery school to offer no-cost early learning to the white working-class children of Summerfield, Tennessee. The Highlander Nursery School was a cooperative institution relying on the material support and goodwill of local residents, and it helped build relationships with families who might otherwise have opposed Highlander's pro-civil rights agenda.

=== Civil rights ===
In the 1950s, Highlander turned its energies to the rising issues of civil rights and desegregation. In addition to Myles Horton, Zilphia Horton, and others, a key figure during this period was John Beauchamp Thompson, a minister and educator who became one of the principal fund-raisers and speakers for the school. Highlander worked with Esau Jenkins of Johns Island to develop a literacy program for Black individuals who were prevented from registering to vote by literacy requirements. Jenkins used buses carrying island residents to Charleston as a mobile classroom, teaching passengers sections of the state constitution and other material they must know to pass voter-registration literacy tests. Bernice Robinson, a seamstress and civic activist, taught informal literacy classes in the back of her beauty salon to prepare adults for voter-registration tests and train other teachers the Citizenship School model.

This work led to the development of the Citizenship Education Program (CEP), which used literacy lessons, community problem solving, and local leadership training to help adults gain the skills necessary to register and vote. The Citizenship Education Schools coordinated by Septima Clark with assistance from Bernice Robinson spread across the South and helped thousands of Blacks register to vote. Clark played a vital role in shaping the CEP's curriculum and approach, while Robinson became the first Citizenship School teacher. The CEP grew into a larger regional network and began training local leaders, expanding voter registration, and creating grassroots citizenship classes throughout the South. As state pressure on Highlander increased, the program was transferred to the Southern Christian Leadership Conference (SCLC) in 1961, which had the resources and political protection necessary to continue expansion.

Civil rights activists, most notably King, Bevel, Bernard Lafayette, Rosa Parks, John Lewis, and Julian Bond, came to the Center at different times. Lewis revealed later that he had his first meal in an integrated setting at Highlander. "I was a young adult, but I had never eaten a meal in the company of Black and white diners," the congressman wrote. He continued, "Highlander was the place that Rosa Parks witnessed a demonstration of equality that helped inspire her to keep her seat on a Montgomery bus, just a few weeks after her first visit. She saw Septima Clark, a legendary black educator, teaching side-by-side with (Highlander founder Myles) Horton. For her it was revolutionary. She had never seen an integrated team of equals working together, and it inspired her."

The civil rights anthem, "We Shall Overcome", was adapted from a gospel song, by Highlander music director Zilphia Horton, wife of Myles Horton, from the singing of striking tobacco factory workers from the 1945–1946 Charleston Cigar Factory strike. Shortly afterward, it was published by folksinger Pete Seeger in the People's Songs bulletin. It was revived at Highlander by Guy Carawan, who succeeded Zilphia Horton as Highlander's music director in 1959. Guy Carawan taught the song to SNCC at their first convening at Shaw University. The song has since spread and become one of the most recognizable movement songs in the world.

=== Backlash ===
Highlander was the target of violence and suppression many times since its founding. In reaction to the school's desegregation work in the 1950s, Southern politicians, business leaders, and newspapers accused Highlander of fomenting racial strife. In 1957, the Georgia Commission on Education published a pamphlet titled "Highlander Folk School: Communist Training School, Monteagle, Tennessee". A photo of Martin Luther King Jr. alongside Highlander co-founder and known radical Donald Lee West appeared on billboards throughout the South with the caption "Martin Luther King at Communist Training School," part of a coordinated red-baiting campaign to discredit Highlander and its allies. In its surveillance of West, the FBI reported that he had been district director of the Communist Party in North Carolina in the 1930s, though he denied ever being a Communist Party member.

Segregationist groups utilized pamphlets, billboards, and newspaper campaigns to portray Highlander as a communist or terrorist organization, in hopes to shift public opinion against the school and its activist agenda. During this period, the FBI conducted intense, long-term surveillance of Highlander, gathering reports on staff, programs, students, and visitors. Many of these reports contained false and misinterpreted claims about the mission of the school and its political ties, which created further suspicion. State officials developed a broad strategy that focused on suppressing the success of Highlander through intense legal pressure. Authorities in Tennessee worked closely alongside federal agencies in an effort to target the school.

In July 1959, Highlander was raided and padlocked during an interracial voter-education workshop. State officials seized all resources, removed the participants, and shut down the building, alleging they had violated their non-profit charter by engaging in commercial activities. After a lengthy court battle, the state of Tennessee revoked Highlander's charter, and confiscated and auctioned the school's land and property. According to Septima Clark's autobiography, the Highlander Folk School was closed because it engaged in commercial activities in violation of its charter, which specified it as a non-profit corporation without stockholders or owners. The state argued that Highlander had violated its charter, while Highlander insisted that the charges were politically motivated. When the court ruled in favor of the state, Highlander lost its charter and property. In 1961 the Highlander staff reincorporated as the Highlander Research and Education Center and moved to Knoxville. A decade later, Highlander relocated to a 104-acre farm near New Market, Tennessee.

=== Appalachian issues ===
In the 1960s and 1970s, Highlander focused on worker health and safety in the coalfields of Appalachia. The school's leaders, including president Mike Clark, played a role in the emergence of the region's environmental justice movement. Highlander helped start the Southern Appalachian Leadership Training (SALT) program, and coordinated a survey of land ownership in Appalachia. In the 1980s and 1990s, Highlander expanded into broader regional, national, and international environmentalism; struggles against the negative effects of globalization; and grassroots leadership development in under-resourced communities. Beginning in the 1990s, became involved in LGBT issues, both in the U.S. and internationally, and in youth-focused organizing.

=== Methodology: Popular Education and Participatory Research ===
Highlander's educational method emphasizes hands-on learning, collective problem solving, and connecting literacy to civic activism. Workshops attracted individuals seeking to improve their communities, utilizing role play techniques to rehearse public meetings and voter-registration. Literacy lessons were taught around practical texts like voter-registration forms and constitutional rights to prepare students for civic participation. In the 1970s, Highlander staff began to plan and facilitate participatory projects surrounding topics that are often complex for non-expert audiences such as environmental risk and corporate land ownership. This work has continued through collaborations that prioritize building relationships and networks so that people with shared stakes can find themselves in conversation with one another.

Highlanders strategic approach is best explained by popular education, a form of participatory research which draws on the lived-experiences and knowledge of individuals. Instructors treat students as partners and focus on practical, community-focused learning. The goal of this teaching style is to equip the community with the resources and skills necessary to make a sustainable difference.

== Since 2000 ==
In the 2000s, Highlander concentrated on issues of democratic participation and economic justice, with a focus on youth, immigrants to the U.S. from Latin America, African Americans, LGBT, and impoverished whites. Highlander has worked on uplifting immigrant and refugee leaders at local, state, and national levels. Their work with immigrant rights focuses on highlighting intersectionality with other social movements and increasing the presence of the US South in the movement.

In 2014, the Tennessee Preservation Trust placed the original Grundy County school building on its list of the ten most "endangered" historic sites in Tennessee.

=== 2019 arson ===
On March 29, 2019, a fire destroyed a building that housed executive offices at the Highlander Center. No one was inside the building, but many items were lost, including decades of historic documents, speeches, artifacts, and memorabilia. White supremacist graffiti, in the form of the Iron Guard symbol, was found at the site. County and state investigations resulted in charges being filed in February 2026 for arson ("Malicious Use of Fire") and "Attempted Provision of Material Support to a Designated Foreign Terrorist Organization"

Regan Prater, who had been linked to White supremacist groups, pled guilty in April 2026 to having set the fire that caused $1.2 million in damage. In October 2026, Prater was sentenced to 17 years in prison.

== Directors ==
The directors of Highlander have been:

- Myles Horton, 1932–1969
- Frank T. Adams, 1970–1973
- Mike Clark, 1973–1978
- Helen Matthews Lewis, 1978–79
- Mike Clark, 1979–1984
- Hubert E. Sapp, 1984–1993
- John Gaventa, 1993–1996
- Jim Sessions, 1996–1999
- Suzanne Pharr, 1999–2003
- Mónica Hernández and Tami Newman, interim co-directors 2004–2005
- Pam McMichael, interim director, 2005; director 2006–2016
- Ash-Lee Woodard Henderson and Allyn Maxfield Steele, co-directors since 2016

== Photo gallery ==
Annemarie Schwarzenbach, 1930s

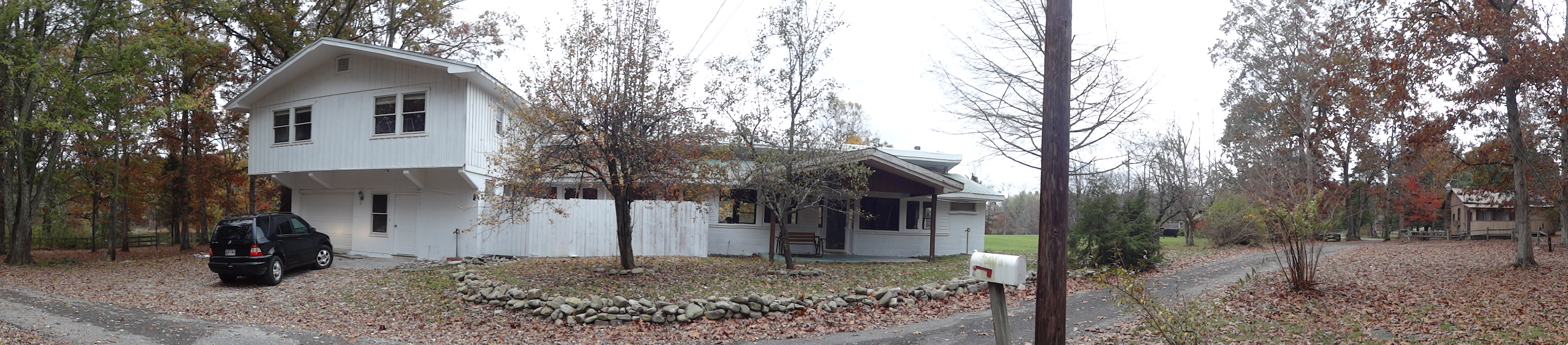
Library panorama, 2014

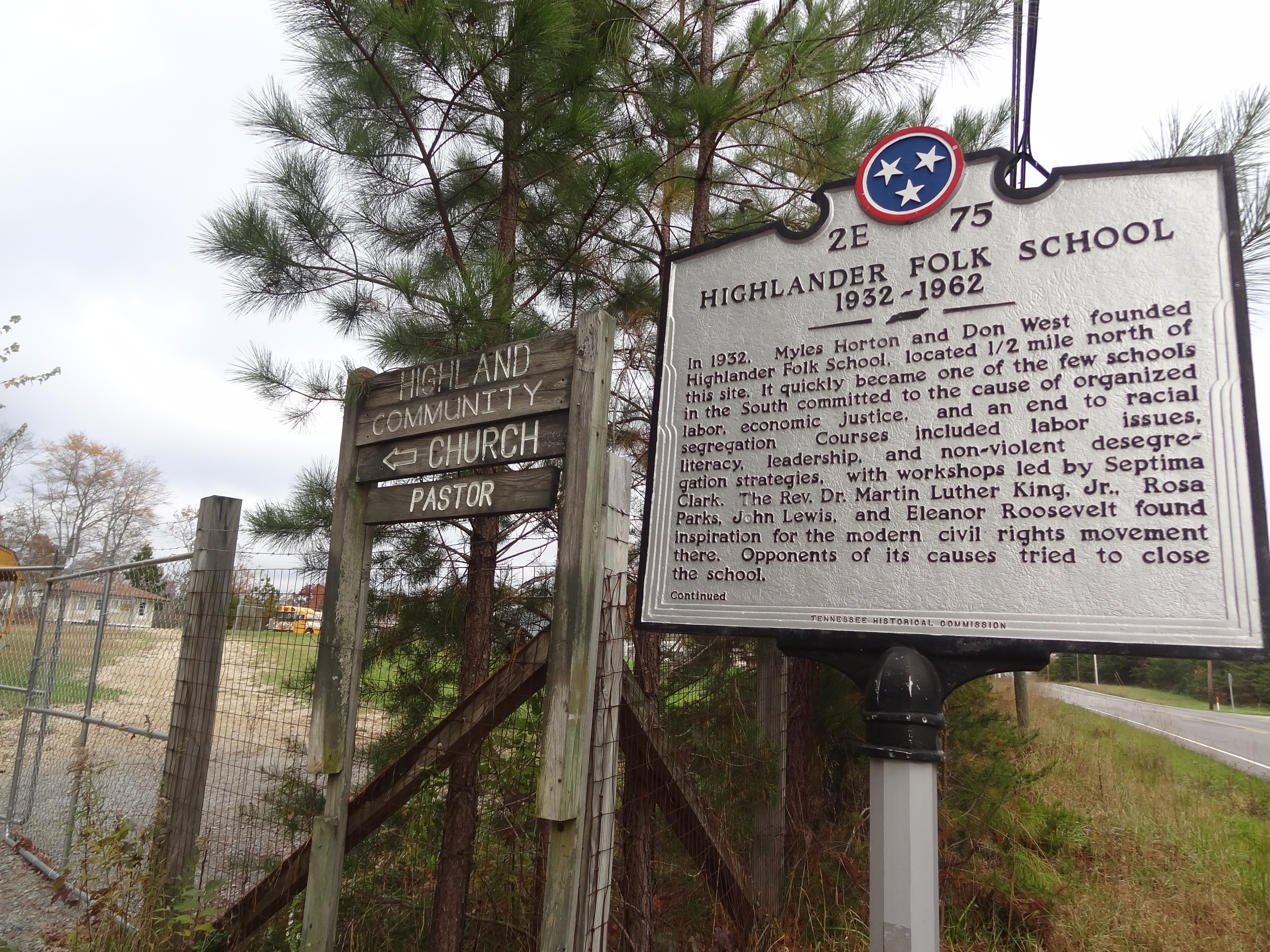
Historical Marker Front

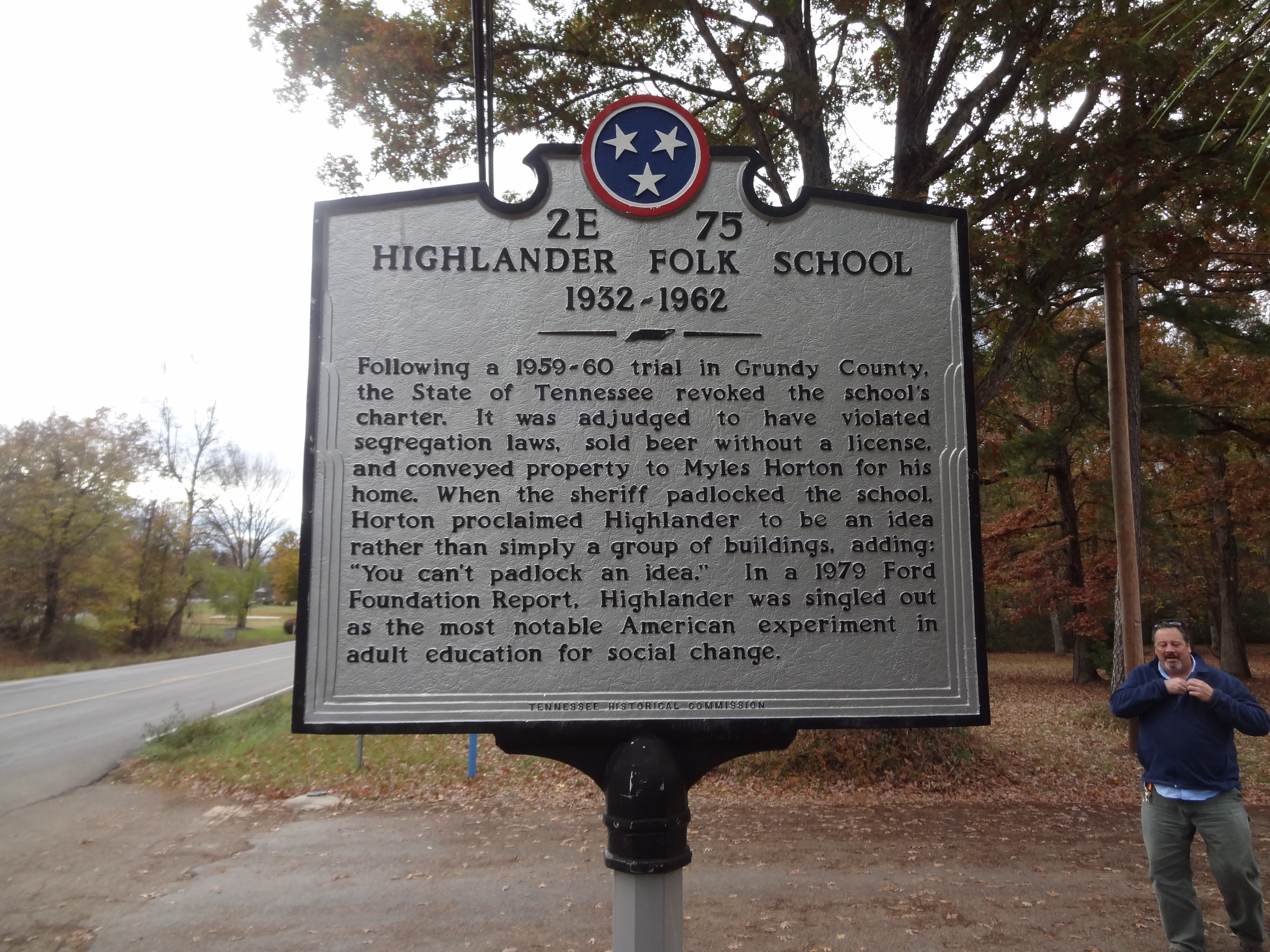
Historical Marker Back

== See also ==
- Continuing education
- May Justus
- Rand School of Social Science (1906), New York
- Work People's College (1907), Minnesota
- Brookwood Labor College (1921), New York
- New York Workers School (1923):
  - New Workers School (1929)
  - Jefferson School of Social Science (1944)
  - Commonwealth College (Arkansas) (1923–1940)
  - Southern Appalachian Labor School (since 1977)
- San Francisco Workers' School (1934)
  - California Labor School (formerly Tom Mooney Labor School) (1942)
- Appalshop (1969), Kentucky
