= Don West (educator) =

American poet and educator

Donald Lee West (June 6, 1906 – September 29, 1992) was an American writer, poet, educator, trade union organizer, civil-rights activist and a co-founder of the Highlander Folk School.

== Early life and career ==
West was born in Devil's Hollow, Gilmer County, Georgia, the child of North Georgia sharecroppers. In high school he led a protest against an on-campus showing of the film The Birth of a Nation and was eventually expelled for other conflicts. He was also expelled from Lincoln Memorial University, in Harrogate, Tennessee, for leading another protest against the paternalism of the campus, though he eventually returned and graduated in 1929. He went on to study under Alva Taylor and Willard Uphaus at the Vanderbilt Divinity School in Nashville and was influenced by the Social Gospel movement. While a student, he became a Socialist and participated in labor strikes in textile factories and coal mines. Like his eventual collaborator Myles Horton, he travelled to Denmark to tour the Danish folk schools. These were schools that promoted adult education and community engagement. Upon their return, Horton and West co-founded the Highlander Folk School in Monteagle, Tennessee. West stayed there only a year, before leaving to found his own Southern Folk School and Libraries in Kennesaw, Georgia.

== Radical and poet ==
West was often accused of being a Communist, but he denied it. In an interview with the Southern Oral History Program, he said, "I have never been a card carrying, dues paying member of the communist party... But I have worked closely with people whom I knew to be communist. And I would never red-bait."

He devoted himself to writing, lectures, and social causes. These included the defense of Angelo Herndon, who was being tried in Atlanta for insurrection. He was also an organizational director of the Kentucky Workers Alliance. West later worked in churches in Ohio and Georgia, taught and became a public school superintendent, and eventually joined the faculty of Oglethorpe University in Atlanta. Forced to leave Oglethorpe during the period of Red-baiting, he continued to edit religious publications and teach creative writing. He testified before the Senate Internal Security Subcommittee in Memphis, Tennessee. He was subpoenaed by the House Un-American Activities Committee but never testified. In the 1940s, his collection of poetry, Clods of Southern Earth, became a literary phenomenon when it sold tens of thousands of copies. He appeared as the character "Tod North" in Clancy Sigal's novel Going Away (1961).

== Later life ==
In 1964, West and his wife, Connie West, invested in the establishment of the Appalachian South Folklife Center in Pipestem, West Virginia, Summers County, West Virginia. One of their two daughters was Hedy West (1938–2005), a well-known folksinger. West died in Charleston, West Virginia, in 1992.

== Sources ==
- James J. Lorence, Biography from the New Georgia Encyclopedia
- "A Radical of Long Standing," by Sheryl James, St. Petersburg Times, 1989
- James J. Lorence, A Hard Journey: The Life of Don West (University of Illinois Press, 2007). ISBN 978-0-252-03231-8

== Selected works ==
- Crab-Grass (poetry) (1931)
- Songs for Southern Workers: Songbook of the Kentucky Workers Alliance. (1937; reprinted, Huntington, WV: Appalachian Movement Press, 1973)
- Clods of Southern Earth (poetry, drawings by Harold Price) (New York: Boni and Gaer, 1946)
- No Lonesome Road: Selected Prose and Poems, ed. by Jeff Biggers and George Brosi (Urbana: University of Illinois Press, 2004)
