= Evan Carawan =

American musician and percussionist

Evan Carawan is an American hammered dulcimer player from Knoxville, Tennessee. He is the son of folk musicians Candie and Guy Carawan. Evan Carawan learned to play hammered dulcimer from his father, who was a pioneer in reviving American interest in the instrument. Carawan typically plays in old-time music, Irish, and new-age styles.

Carawan has been a member of several musical groups, including The Carawan Family (with his parents and other associates, often Will Byers and Don Cassell), and the Atomic City Rhythm Rascals (with David Lovett, Chris McMahon, and Tim Worman).

As a youth in 1972, Carawan taught hammered dulcimer player Malcolm Dalglish his first hammered dulcimer tune, the traditional Drunken Sailor.

Although best known for his hammered dulcimer playing, Carawan also plays the mandolin.

Carawan is also employed at McKay Books in Knoxville, TN.

== Discography ==
- Appalachian and Irish Tunes on Hammer Dulcimer (with Guy Carawan, 1984, Flying Fish Records)
- Homeward Bound (1993, Turquoise Records)
- A Month of Sundays (2000, Ponder Productions)
- Atomic City Rhythm Rascals (2001, Grinning Deer Music)
- The View From Home (2002, Ponder Productions)
- Five Miles From Town (David Lovett & friends, 2005, Grinning Deer Music)
