= Myles Horton =

American educator and activist (1905–1990)

- Portrait of Myles Horton
- Born: July 9, 1905; Savannah, Tennessee, U.S.
- Died: January 19, 1990 (aged 84); New Market, Tennessee, U.S.
- Education: Cumberland University
- Occupations: Educator, civil rights activist
- Known for: Highlander Folk School
- Spouses: Zilphia Mae Johnson (m. 1935; died 1956); Aimee Isgrig (m. 1962, divorced)

Myles Falls Horton (July 9, 1905 – January 19, 1990) was an American educator and political activist. In 1932 he co-founded the Highlander Folk School in Monteagle, Tennessee as a center for adult learning. Over the decades, the school was involved in struggles for labor rights, civil rights, and environmental protection. Highlander's students and teachers included prominent Civil Rights Movement leaders such as Martin Luther King Jr., Rosa Parks (who studied with Horton shortly before her 1955 decision to keep her bus seat in Montgomery, Alabama), Fannie Lou Hamer, Andrew Young, Stokely Carmichael, Septima Clark, John Lewis, James Bevel, Bernard Lafayette, and others who would create the Nashville Student Movement.

== Early years and education ==
Myles Horton was born in 1905 in Savannah, Tennessee to a poor family. He was the eldest of four children. His parents were Elsie Falls Horton and Perry Horton. His father was a Workers' Alliance member, and his mother was a community activist. Both parents belonged to the Cumberland Presbyterian Church. Before the birth of their children, Elsie and Perry Horton had been grade school teachers. When standards for being an educator changed (requiring at least one year of high school), they lost their positions since neither of them had the necessary education. They then worked an assortment of jobs, including in factories and as sharecroppers.

In his autobiography, Myles Horton recalled that while his family lived in poverty, they did not consider themselves poor: "we just thought of ourselves as being conventional people who didn't have any money." He went to high school in Humboldt, Tennessee after the family moved there from Savannah. He soon began to support himself, working in a sawmill and a box factory. The jobs exposed him to union organizing. He attended several colleges, among them Cumberland University—where he graduated with a BA in 1928—and the University of Chicago. While at Cumberland, he occasionally taught Sunday school and Daily Vacation Bible School at a Presbyterian church in the Appalachian town of Ozone, Tennessee.

Horton started becoming politically active as a teenager when he participated in a strike for higher wages at a tomato factory. Almost immediately after entering Cumberland in 1924, he "led a student revolt against the hazing of freshmen by fraternities." Following graduation, he served as secretary of the Tennessee student YMCA, where he was a pioneer in organizing interracial meetings. The secretary position allowed him to travel for the first time to cities like Nashville and Knoxville.

== Career ==
Horton's ideas about education were shaped in part by his work with impoverished mountain people in Ozone. From them, he observed how a free discussion of problems, without indoctrination to any preconceived notions, generated a lively learning environment and brought out suggestions from within the group. He imagined a school where diverse people could come together to develop solutions.

His educational vision was also influenced by his religious background and training. In 1929, he read about social gospel philosophy while attending the Union Theological Seminary in New York City, where he studied under the Christian theologian and socialist Reinhold Niebuhr. Horton wanted to find a means by which societal conditions could be challenged and changed, and education became his primary instrument.

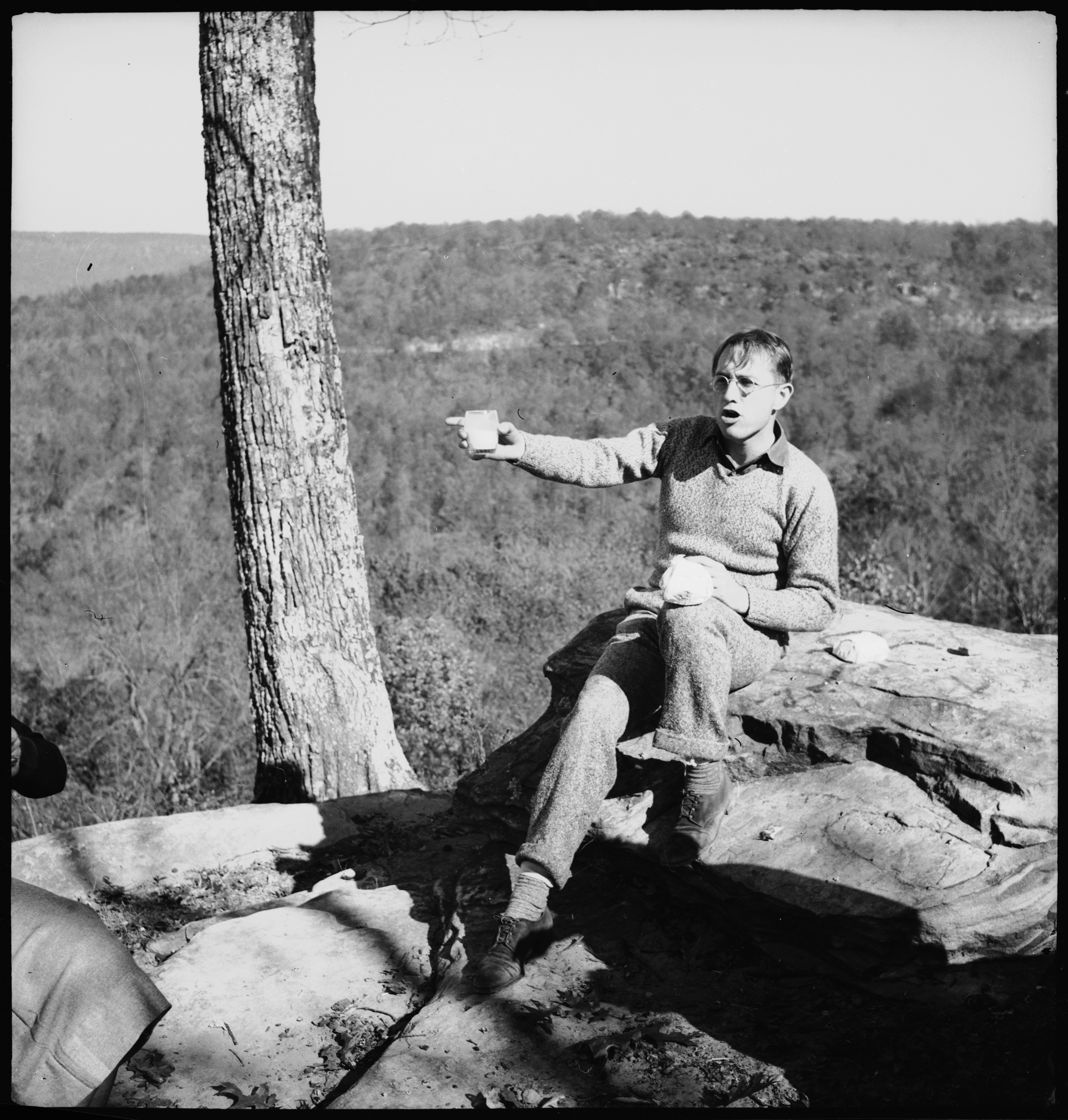
Myles Horton in the 1930s

At the University of Chicago, Horton heard about Danish folk high schools. In 1931 he traveled to Denmark to visit the schools, which were centers for adult education and community empowerment. Inspired by his visit, Horton along with educator Don West and Methodist minister James A. Dombrowski co-founded in 1932 an American version of an adult education center—the Highlander Folk School in Monteagle, Tennessee. As Diane McWhorter described it, the school was based on the Danish concept "that an oppressed people collectively hold strategies for liberation that are lost to its individuals." She added that after its establishment, Highlander became a haven for the South's "handful of functional radicals", many of them CIO organizers, who attempted in the late 1930s to unionize industries in the region.

The term "communist" was applied to Highlander because it brought Whites and Blacks together in violation of racial segregation laws. The school advocated for the working class and the poor and the school's teachings encouraged social activism. Highlander developed a literacy program "that taught thousands of Blacks to read and write in an effort to get them to register to vote." In 1954, Horton was summoned before the Senate Internal Security Subcommittee run by Mississippi Senator James Eastland. The Senate investigation was, in Horton's words:

trying to harass us and make charges of communism to scare Black people away so they wouldn't associate with us.... [T]hey wanted me to name names of people who had been at Highlander and who had been associated with me in various activities. I refused to do that.... Eastland got furious: "I'm going to cite you for contempt if you don't answer the questions." And I said, "I don't see that that will be much of a problem, senator. I'm willing to testify that I'm in contempt of this committee. I'm in contempt of you and everything you stand for." And he said, "Throw him out!" I was picked up by a couple of federal marshals and thrown down on the marble steps of the court of justice.

In the summer of 1955, Rosa Parks attended a two-week workshop, taught by Septima Clark, at Highlander. Parks later said that in her December 1955 decision to challenge Montgomery's segregated bus system, she drew courage and inspiration from Clark's teaching.

Horton came under increasing attacks in the 1950s for communist conspiracy charges and for flouting state segregation laws. On July 31, 1959, Highlander was raided and padlocked by local police during an interracial voter-education workshop. Horton reportedly said at the time, "You can padlock a building, but you can't padlock an idea." The school was also cited for selling alcohol without a license; the evidence for the illegal sales was an "honor box" in the kitchen where Highlanders donated money after taking a beer from the refrigerator.

After a prolonged court battle, the state of Tennessee revoked Highlander's charter in 1961 and seized its Monteagle property. Horton quickly applied for a new charter and reopened the school under the name Highlander Research and Education Center, first in Knoxville and then in 1971 in New Market, Tennessee. Two years later he retired as the school's director.

== Personal life ==
In 1935, Horton married Zilphia Mae Johnson. They had two children. She closely collaborated with him at the Highlander Folk School until her death in 1956. In 1962 he married Aimee Isgrig.

== Death and legacy ==
On January 19, 1990, Myles Horton died of a brain tumor at his home in New Market. He was 84.

In their 1985 documentary You Got to Move, Lucy Massie Phenix and Veronica Selver prominently featured Horton and the Highlander Folk School. He inspired the founding of the Myles Horton Organization at the University of Tennessee in 1986. The group organized numerous protests and events in the Chattanooga, Tennessee area, including demonstrations to counter the Ku Klux Klan, and the construction of a shantytown on campus to encourage the university to divest from South Africa.

After his death, the Highlander Research and Education Center continued to operate, with an increased focus on the social consequences related to environmental problems.

== See also ==
- List of civil rights leaders
- Highlander Folk School
- Cumberland Presbyterian Church

== Bibliography ==
- Adams, Frank, with Horton, Myles. Unearthing Seeds of Fire: The Idea of Highlander. Winston-Salem, NC: John F. Blair, 1975. ISBN 0-89587-019-3
- Associated Press. "Highlander School Proves Ideas Can't Be Padlocked". Salt Lake Tribune: 9, August 1992: A31. Print. 14, May 2014.
- Ayers, Bill; Quinn, Therese (2003). "Horton, Myles (1905–1990)". In Guthrie, James W. (ed.). Encyclopedia of Education. Vol. 3 (2nd ed.). New York: Macmillan Library Reference. ISBN 978-0028655970.
- Brooks, Christopher A., ed. (2011). "Civil Rights". The African American Almanac (11th ed.). Detroit: Gale Research. pp. 401–473. ISBN 978-1414445472.
- Glen, John M. Highlander: No Ordinary School. Knoxville: University of Tennessee Press, 1996. ISBN 0-87049-928-9
- Hale, Jon N. (2007). "Early Pedagogical Influences on the Mississippi Freedom Schools: Myles Horton and Critical Education in the Deep South". In Null, J. Wesley (ed.). American Educational History Journal: Volume 34, Numbers 1 & 2. Charlotte: Information Age Publishing. pp. 315–329. ISBN 978-1593117689.
- Horton, Myles; Kohl, Herbert; Kohl, Judith (1990). The Long Haul: An Autobiography. New York: Doubleday. ISBN 978-0385263139.
- McWhorter, Diane (2001). Carry Me Home: Birmingham, Alabama, the Climactic Struggle of the Civil Rights Revolution. New York: Touchstone. ISBN 978-0684807478.
- Preskill, Stephen (2021). Education in Black and White: Myles Horton and the Highlander Center's Vision for Social Justice. University of California Press. ISBN 978-0520302051.
- Rahimi, S. (2002). Myles Horton. Peace Review, 14 (3), 343–348. doi:10.1080/1367886022000016910

== Video references ==
- We Shall Overcome, Ginger Group Productions, 1988; PBS Home Video 174, 58 min. Myles Horton discusses Highlander's role, through his wife Zilphia Horton's music program, in promoting the song "We Shall Overcome" to the Southern labor movement in the 1930s, and then to the Civil Rights Movement in the 1950s and 60s.
