= African-American women in the civil rights movement =

Civil Rights Movement in the US during the Cold War

African American women of the nonviolent civil rights movement (1954–1968) played a significant role to its impact and success. Women involved participated in sit-ins and other political movements such as the Montgomery Bus Boycott (1955). Organizations and other political demonstrations sparked change for the likes of equity and equality, women's suffrage, anti-lynching laws, Jim Crow Laws and more.

African American women attained important positions in both leadership and supporting roles during the movement, including Rosa Parks, who led the Montgomery Bus Boycott, Diane Nash, the main organizer of the Nashville sit-ins and the continuation of the Freedom Rides, and Ella Baker, the SCLC organizer who initiated the organizing meeting of SNCC.

Lack of recognition to the African American women during the movement often stemmed from the issue of having to navigate both race and gender norms during the time period.

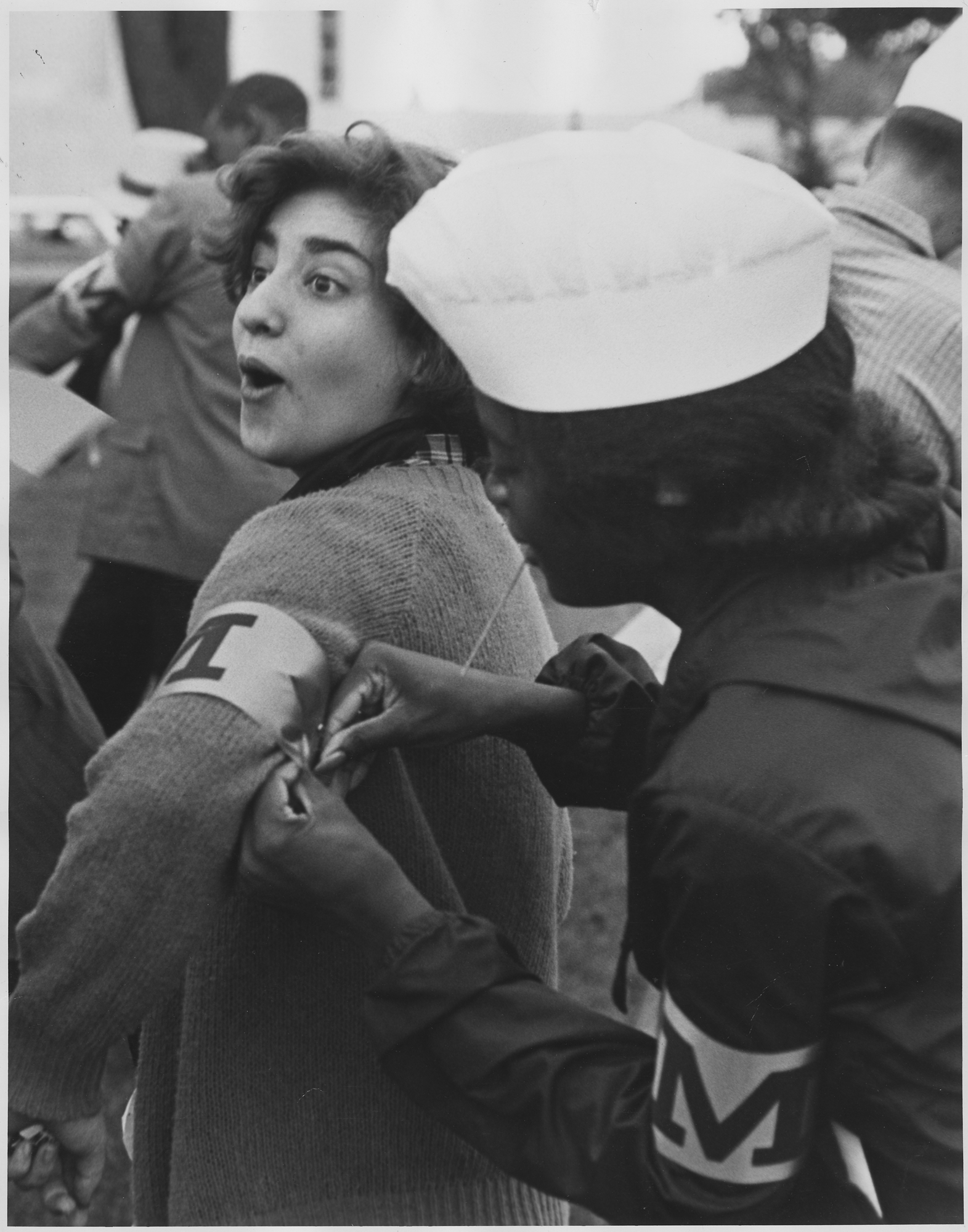
Women prepare to march on Washington, D.C., 1963

== Womanism ==
When addressing Black women activism, such as that present in the civil rights movement, Alice Walker uses the term "womanism" to encompass the motives of and reasoning behind African American female participation. Walker, a civil rights activist who created the phrase "womanism," considers the feminist movement as failing to include the struggles of women of color, and, thus, failing to address the intersectionality of female marginalization. She deems womanism, characterized by the Black female commitment to community, as inclusive of the social barriers that have shaped the African American woman experience. Thus, studies of Walker's Womanism observe the role of this idea in social rights movements and Black activism, as womanism defines the intersection of race and gender within the African American female experience and explains the Black woman's call to leadership.

Dating back to West African societies, civilizations observed the strength of the Black woman necessary for the family unit's survival. For example, women served in vital positions in the slave trade, proving these groups’ view of female strength and power. This perspective translated to the New World, as demonstrated in the female slave's role in caregiving as well as upholding familial stability due to the Black man's lack of power within American society. Today, one observes this same strength and compensation for the African American man's societal capacity, two defining components of womanism. Walker views feminism as dealing with the White woman trapped in the private sphere, unable to enter the labor force due to gender norms. She argues that this demonstrates the White female struggle, excluding the African American woman from its narrative. African American women have historically worked in the labor force, leading Walker to define their struggles as different from the White woman's confinement to the home. Alice Walker's term considers the burden of both leading and providing financially for the family as part of the Black woman's struggle and defines their ties to a sense of community. Womanist studies suggest this loyalty to the community provides the foundation for Black women activists serving in leadership roles.

Studies note that the relationship between womanism and the civil rights movement manifests itself in womanism's role in including Black female activists acting as participants and leaders. Encompassing the Black woman's loyalty to the community and the community's consequential dependence on the African American woman, author Tiyi Makeda Morris uses womanism to define the ties Black women possess in participating in social and political activism. She addresses the intersection of race and gender African American women face in their daily lives, thus designating these women as natural leaders in social movements, according to womanist principles. Morris argues that Walker's womanism allowed these women to occupy various activist positions due to their experience with facing oppression from both race and gender, making their activist motives inclusive and equipping them with the necessary tools to lead social movements and participate in Black activism, as demonstrated in the civil rights movement.

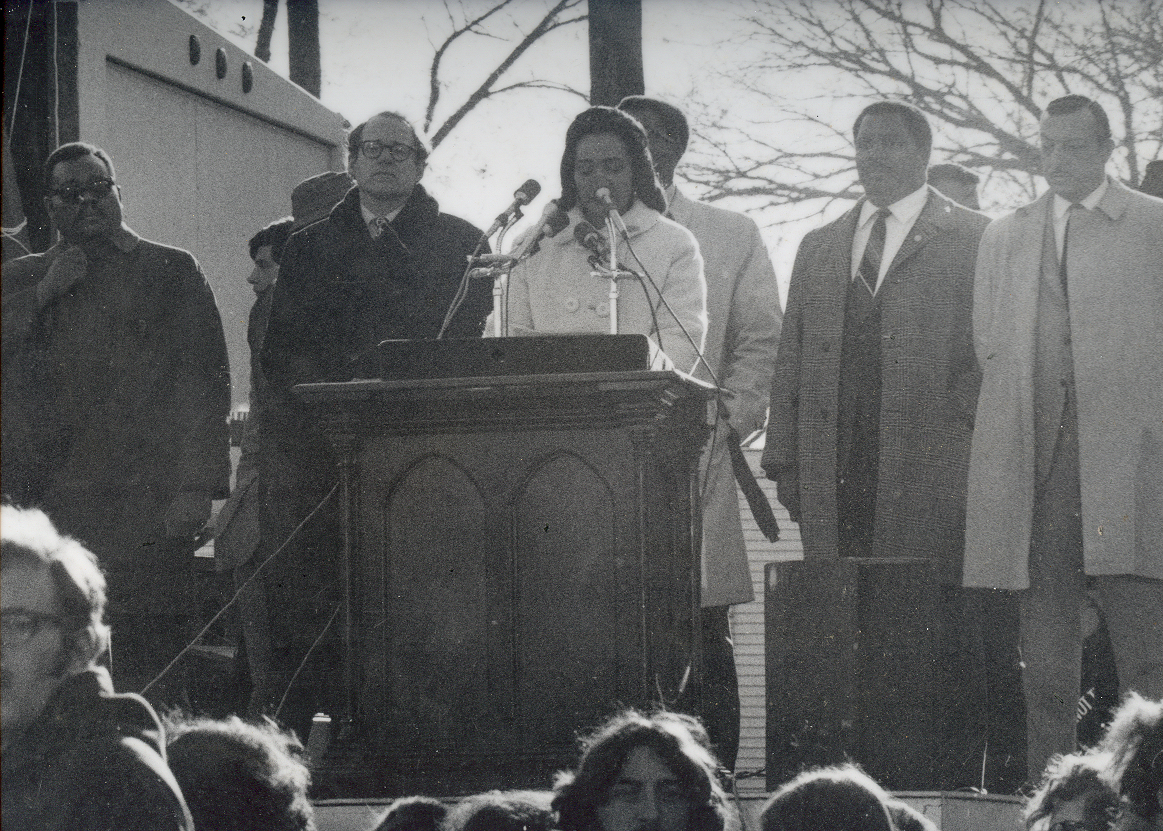
Coretta Scott King at Sheep Meadow in Manhattan Central Park, New York, NY- soon after the assassination of Dr. King.

== Roles that American women played in the civil rights movement ==
=== Supporting roles ===
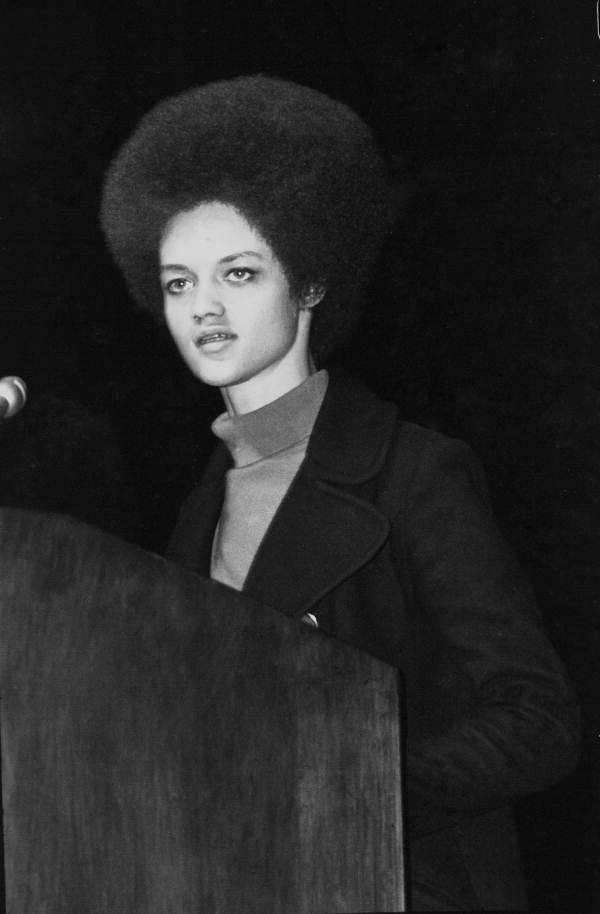
Kathleen Cleaver delivering a speech, 1971

African American women held together Black households and their communities while adapting and overcoming obstacles they faced due to their gender, race, and class. Many women used their communities and local church to gain support for the movement, as local support proved vital for the success of the movement. These women played active roles in homes, churches, social clubs, organizations, and communities, which supported the main movement. Women in the civil rights movement gave their time and used their skills on the front lines and behind the scenes. Some women provided their services by using their restaurants to prepare food for protestors, while others provided housing. Many women opened their stores or homes to create safe-havens, where civil rights workers could meet and discuss plans or strategies, while some used their careers to raise funds for the cause. Women involved in the civil rights movement included students, mothers, and professors, as they balanced many roles in different parts of their lives. Writing and literature, such as newspaper articles, poems, and stories, proved popular methods of promoting the civil rights movement. Women such as Ida B. Wells used their journalism skills to provide protection for Black women suffering from sexual violence. Women often devised plans to create the signs held at marches and led chants or songs during these protests. African American women provided for their families and played prominent roles in boycotts and demonstrations while educating children and adults.

=== Leadership roles ===
==== Leadership exclusion ====
African American women suffered from exclusion in formal leadership positions (roles holding authority under an official title), as demonstrated in minister-led organizations, like the Montgomery Improvement Association (MIA) and the Southern Christian Leadership Conference (SCLC), as well as secular groups, like the Student Nonviolent Coordinating Committee (SNCC). In Committees, men were always more than women. Irene West was the only woman on the nine-number committee to form a bank and savings association, and Rosa Parks was the only one tasked with drafting the MIA constitution. Within the MIA, leaders limited female participation to areas that involved stereotypically feminine qualities, such as community services. Further, the newsletter often failed to address contributions from women involved in the group. The SCLC and other Church organizations featured a predominantly male executive board, leading many women, such as Septima Clark and Ella Baker, to feel oppressed and objectified under a patriarchal system. The secular organization SNCC upheld a structure that enforced female subordination, giving women roles that relied on the leadership of a higher position of power. Women participating within this group often preferred informal positions, for a female title job typically equated to more structure and, thus, more restrictions. Informal roles included fieldwork, such as leading recruitment for movement participation.

==== African American women as bridge leaders ====
As mentioned before, Black women experienced restrictions in exercising power within the civil rights movement, leading many women to occupy informal leadership positions, characterized by the ability to personally exercise power over constituents without a formal title. Many women served as "bridge leaders" due to sexist attitudes preventing them from obtaining higher, formal positions of power. As bridge leaders, these women formed valuable connections with those unable to gain political power, thus amplifying potential constituents’ voices and communicating their messages within the social movement. This female capacity to connect with individuals creates a gendered lens when studying the civil rights movement organization.

Despite these restrictions women faced when accessing power, African American women still found ways to act as leaders and make valuable connections within the civil rights movement. As bridge leaders, Black women created networks with those holding formal leadership roles. Thus, they formed necessary ties that connected movement participants with those in official, decision-making positions. This manifests itself in African American women forming bonds with those in the deep South, as these Black Southerners experienced hesitation with supporting the civil rights movement due to traditional Church ideals against protest and less media coverage on the movement's advancements. Female bridge leaders worked to create personal connections with these Southerners by hearing their goals and experiences while simultaneously merging these ideas with the civil rights agenda. Acting as bridge leaders allowed women to form networks within local communities as well as with those in formal positions. Black women holding these informal leadership roles formed valuable relationships with local community members, strengthening the movement's goals and agenda through local participants' contributions. Both the SCLC and SNCC used these networks with local participants to their advantage, often hosting meetings within these people's homes. Women within the Mississippi Freedom Democratic Party also formulated valuable ties with those in the local community and worked to increase the area's voter registration.

Lastly, serving as bridge leaders allowed women to fulfill the movement's goals through their own agenda. Due to the informality of their jobs, these Black women could work towards movement goals however they saw fit, regardless of formal leaders' agendas. This allowed African American women to form closer ties to their constituents and operate on their constituents' wishes rather than those of a formal leader.

==== African American women leaders ====
Women not only provided help to those in power but also held important leadership positions within the civil rights movement, creating Black female support networks. African American female leaders include student Judy Richardson, who left college to organize projects, such as voter-registration drives. Kathleen Cleaver took the risk of serving as the first woman on the central committee of the Black Panther Party, making her a target of the FBI. Ella Mae Brayboy became the co-director of the voter registration drives sponsored by the Voter Education Project (VEP). Grace Hamilton was the first African American woman to be elected to the state legislature in the South. More women ran for political offices during this period of time, but they lacked attention due to the election of the first Black mayor, Maynard Jackson. Mary McLeod Bethune, a civil rights activist, made her voice heard, but was more subtle in how she did it. She seized every opportunity she could get her hands on to speak to the public about African American Civil rights. She spoke for women like Elizabeth Keckley, Frances E. Harper, Pauli Murray and Shirley Chisholm. All of these women looked for an opportunity to talk about civil rights so they can help pave the way for future African American women in the United States. These female leaders took positions of responsibility in which they accomplished great feats, most commonly left out of the narrative. They impacted African American history, because they wanted to have a voice in what they can do within society during the Civil Rights Movement.

== The Montgomery bus boycott ==
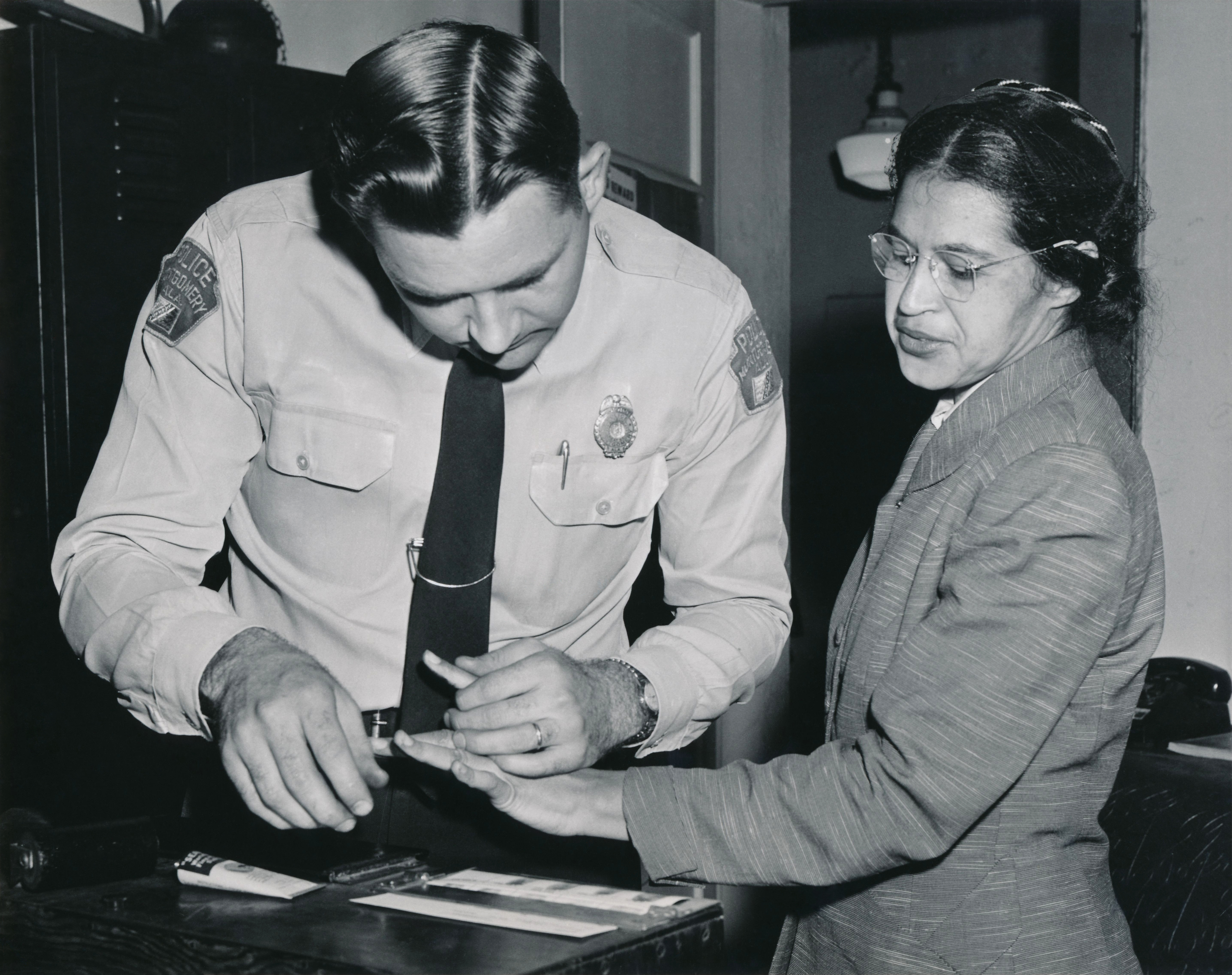
Rosa Parks being fingerprinted by Deputy Sheriff D.H. Lackey after being arrested on February 22, 1956, during the Montgomery bus boycott.

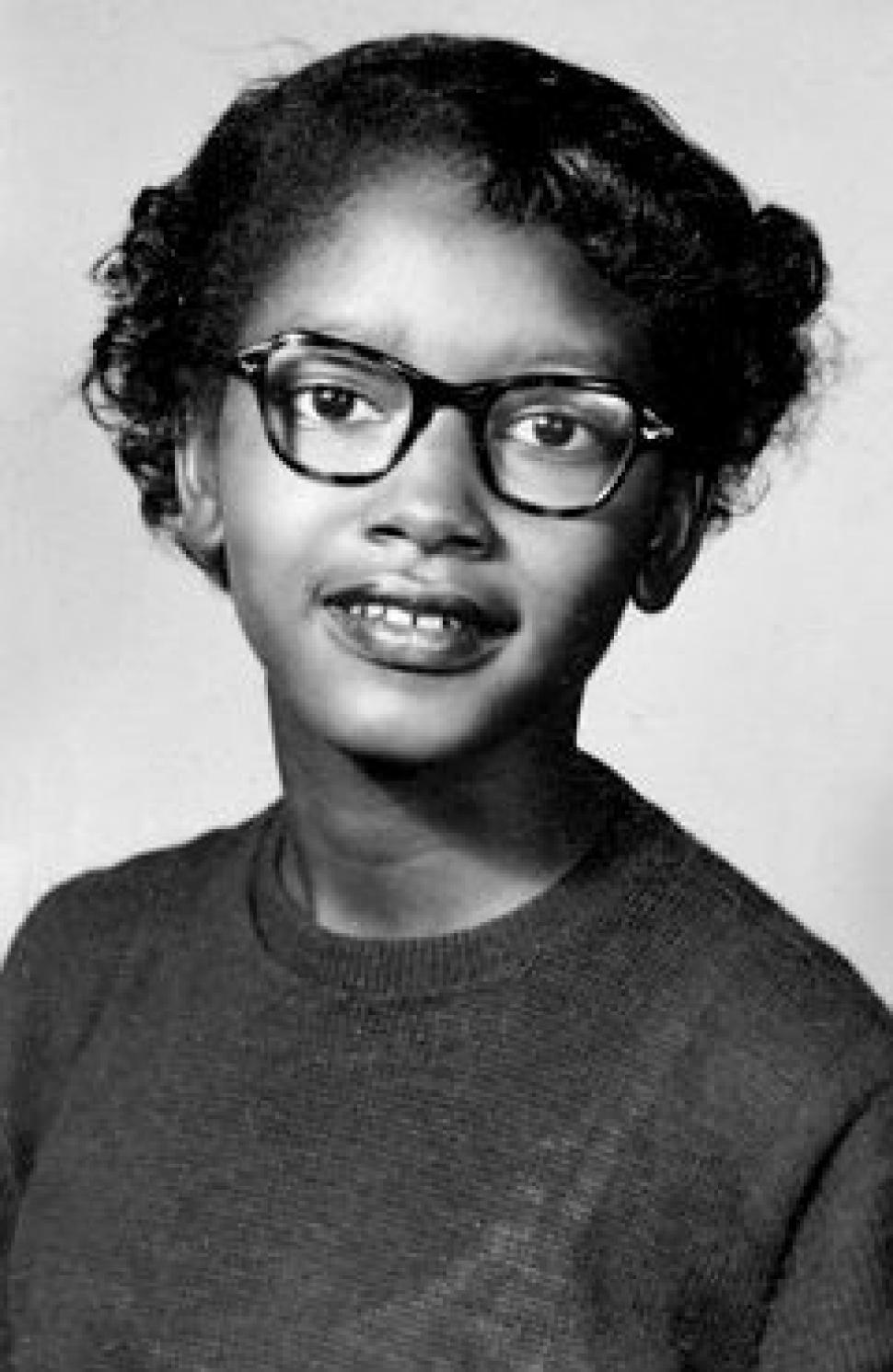
Claudette Colvin, arrested for not giving up her seat on a Montgomery bus nine months before Rosa Parks, was a main plaintiff in the Browder v. Gayle case which ended local bus discrimination in the United States.

=== Rosa Parks continues the movement ===
Before Rosa Parks, Martha White sparked the Baton Rouge Bus Boycott in the Deep South. The 1953 protest in Baton Rouge, was triggered by her ejection from a bus for sitting in a “whites only” section. White was a 31-year-old housekeeper during the summer of 1953, when she would walk miles in the sweltering heat to reach her bus stop and go to and from work. But on June 15, 1953, the only seats available on the bus were designated for white passengers only.

White decided to take a seat just behind the bus driver and was soon ordered to get up. She refused, and another Black woman whose name is unknown, sat by her side. The bus driver threatened to have the two arrested before the police, the bus company manager and civil rights activist Rev. T.J. Jemison arrived at the scene. Jemison informed the driver of a recently passed ordinance to desegregate the buses in the city, meaning White was not violating any rules.

Bus drivers across the city began a strike against the new ordinance, and it was later overturned by the district attorney. They allegedly said that the law violated the state's segregation laws. In response, Jemison, attorney Johnnie Jones and activist Willis Reed led a bus boycott for the Black community of Baton Rouge. More than 80% of bus riders at the time were Black, so the boycott was a major problem for the city's public transportation system. Eight days after the boycott's launch, Jemison negotiated an agreement with the city for better seating arrangements for Black riders.

The Montgomery bus boycott galvanized the civil rights movement after Rosa Parks refused to give up her bus seat, leading to her arrest in 1955 and the start of a 13-month boycott of the Montgomery bus company. Previous to this, Rosa Parks had worked for the Montgomery National Association for the Advancement of Coloured People (NAACP). Parks had been arrested before the boycott in 1955 by the bus company, her actions played a significant role in the movement as the boycott was the first of direct action and established Martin Luther King as the voice and leader of the movement. African American women played a prominent role in the boycott, through assembling participants from the church and other local connections while supporting their own families. This help at a local level enabled the movement and allowed it to achieve momentum and reach a global level.

=== Jo Ann Gibson Robinson ===
Jo Ann Gibson Robinson aided in advancing the Montgomery bus boycott through her relations with those in decision-making positions of power. As a bridge leader, Robinson gathered members of the Women's Political Council (WPC) in support of protesting the arrest of Rosa Parks and legal segregation within public transportation. Using her position as a way to connect the wishes of the movement's participants with the civil rights agenda of formal leaders, Robinson helped start the Montgomery bus boycott. She voiced the concerns of the people to ministers in power, who then organized the official protest. Her involvement outlines the role of bridge leaders in connecting constituents with those in power to complete the civil rights movement agenda.

== Lack of recognition of African American women ==
Black women in the 1960s not only organized and led protests for civil rights, but expanded their reach into issues such as poverty, feminism, and other social matters. The "master narrative" depicts a civil rights movement constructed around notable male figures, failing to fully include female contributors. Although women activists lack recognition for their efforts during this time, they acted as primary characters in executing a powerful and successful movement. Studies have suggested gender ideals often channeled women away from formal leadership positions within the American civil rights movement, leaving them to tend to informal leadership positions, when available. Many Black women participating in informal leadership positions, acting as natural "bridge leaders" and, thus, working in the background in communities and rallying support for the movement at a local level, partly explains why standard narratives neglect to acknowledge the imperative roles of women in the civil rights movement. Further, the idea of a "collective identity" among participants and leaders in social movements, such as the civil rights movement, hinders the acknowledgement of African American female involvement. It ignores the intersectionality of race and gender within the civil rights movement, leading to lack of recognition for African American women.

During the civil rights era, African American women found ways to support each other within the movement. Within their communities, they made the decision to help one another by providing housing and encouragement.The contributions they made to their communities had a tremendous impact not only on themselves but also on others around them.. African American woman were integral to their communities' survival and advancement-developing social justice and social programs. When they helped, the women didn't expect any personal reward or outcome. They wanted to support others. the conditions under which African Americans were forced to live and work, and the barriers they confronted in their effort to achieve first-class citizenship. African American women played a huge part in inspiring their whole communities to stand together and fight back.

== Notable African American women in the movement ==
=== Daisy Bates (1914–1999) ===
Although Daisy Bates and Ella Baker both held key positions in established civil rights organizations, each received little recognition as the "movement leaders" within the Black community, and both paid an economic price for their leadership roles. Bates, head of Little Rock's NAACP, lost the newspaper owned by her and her husband. Due to sexist motives, Baker never received a permanent position in SCLC or a salary comparable to the man who replaced her.

=== Diane Nash ===
Diane Nash, the chairman of the Nashville Student Movement, helped organize the Nashville sit-ins, continued the Freedom Rides which protested objecting against segregated public transportation. In Alabama, the efforts of this group almost halted due to a violent attack on this organization. However, Nash told the Nashville Student Movement and an Alabama SCLC executive that citizen violence should not stop the Freedom Riders' efforts and, thus, the goals of the civil rights movement.

Nash went on to work with her husband James Bevel in organizing activities in the Mississippi voting rights movement, the 1963 Children's Crusade in Birmingham and 1965 Selma voting rights movement in Alabama, and was active in the Chicago open housing movement in 1966.

=== Ella Baker (1903–1986) ===
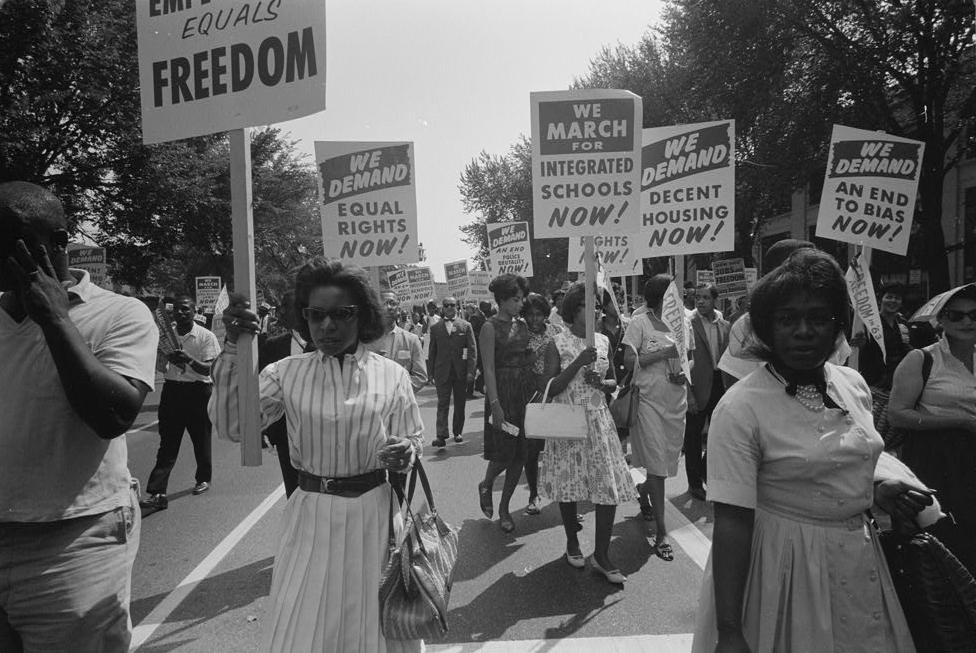
Women marching for equal rights, integrated schools and decent housing

Ella Baker served as a temporary director of the Southern Christian Leadership Conference, serving as a bridge leader responsible for connecting participants with formal modes of power. Through the SNCC, she created networks for student activists who wished to contribute to the organization. She granted these activists rotating positions of power, giving the community access to power within the movement.

The nonhierarchical organization and group-centered leadership philosophy of SNCC were developed by Ella Baker. Executive committees and rotating chairmen served as forms of leadership. The intention was not for SNCC to take the lead in a community, but rather to develop leadership within it. Baker's theory served as the foundation for SNCC's community mobilization initiatives. When SNCC workers arrived in a community, they tried to improve upon what was already there in order to establish local leadership.

Baker also noted the importance of women within the movement, as she considers them critical actors and the "backbone" of the civil rights movement. Ella Baker also now has an organization named after her that empowers individuals with limited financial resources to foster strength and prosperity within local communities.

=== Septima Poinsette Clark (1898–1987) ===
Septima Poinsette Clark created the Citizenship Education Program at Highlander Folk School in hopes of increasing Black voter registration within the South. She considered the Black Southerners of these rural communities as vital to propelling the civil rights movement, thus fueling her to act as a bridge leader between this population and those in formal positions of power. Her program focused on teaching literacy, with the help of teacher Bernice Robinson, to increase African American political knowledge, in hopes of informing these communities of their deprivation of deserved civil rights. She believed this understanding would then translate to higher Black Southern voter registration.

Through her leadership in the Citizenship Education Program, Clark acted as a bridge leader, for she involved the SCLC in the program's implementation, thus using formal leadership to appeal to her constituents: African American Southerners. Further, she merged the interests of the individual Black Southerner with the goals of the civil rights movement, cultivating support within this population for the movement's agenda.

Septima Clark received praise for her role as a teacher and organizer of adult "citizenship schools" throughout the South. Respondents highlighted her brilliance and ability to personally connect with locals.

=== Fannie Lou Hamer ===
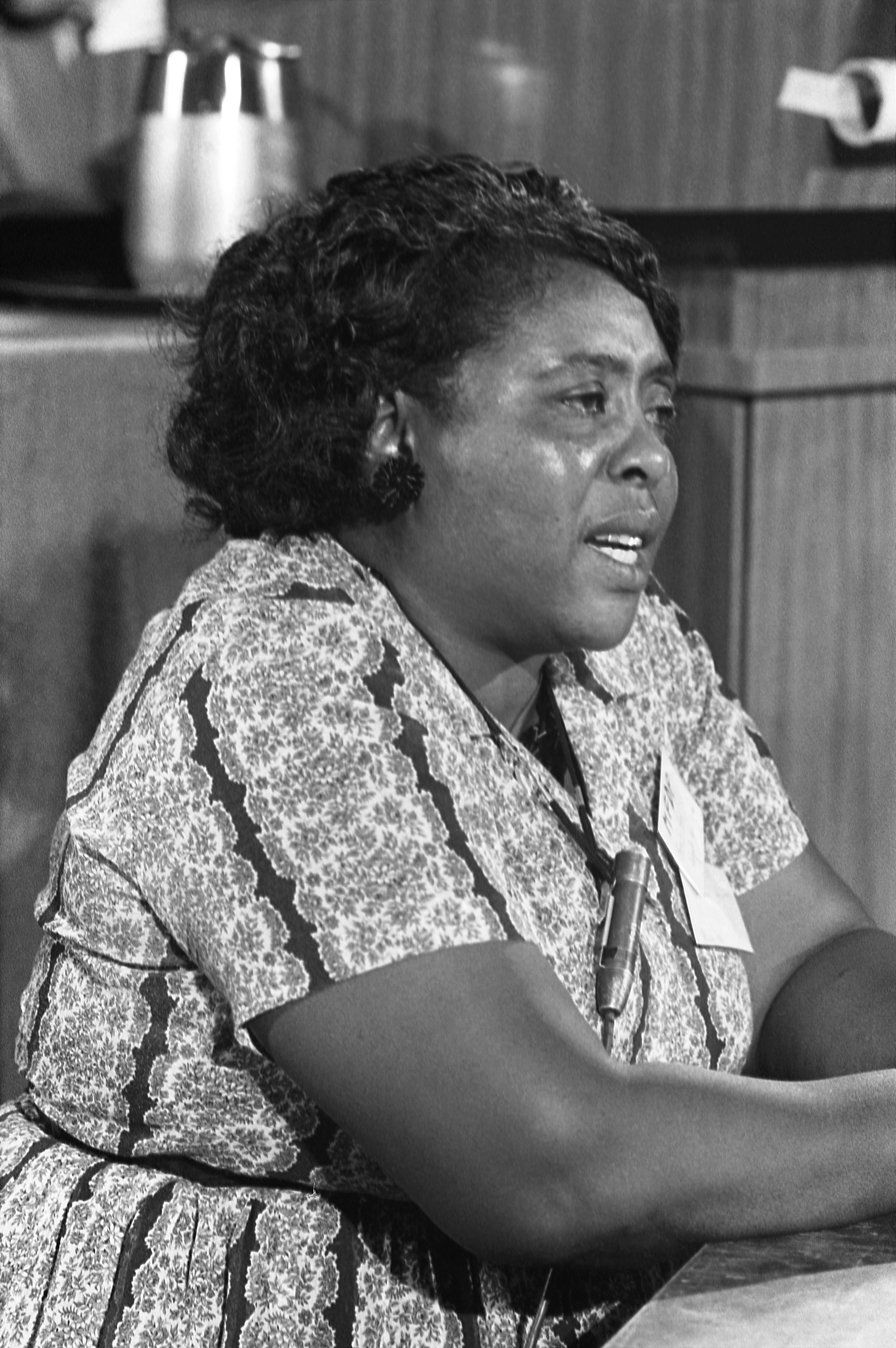
Fannie Lou Hamer founded Freedom Farm Cooperative, an operation meant to alleviate Black sharecropper poverty in the South.

Fannie Lou Hamer, born in 1917 and raised in Montgomery County, Mississippi, was a civil rights activist that believed in the rights of women and African American women. According to Janice Hamlet's essay “‘Fannie Lou Hamer: The Unquenchable Spirit of the Civil Rights Movement’” describes Hamer as a power voice and standing up for her fellow African American women. She joined the southern civil rights movement and she rose to become a powerful leader. She was seeking freedom for all of the oppressed people and used her ability to examine the power of ethos. Hamer, as well as Rosa Parks, Daisy Bates, and Ella Baker were a part of a major turning point in the women's civil rights movement. Women were much more involved than men were, due to the fact that they wanted to have equal rights with men.

=== Bernice Robinson ===
Bernice Robinson played a vital role in gathering support for the civil rights movement within the deep South. Working with Clark under the Citizenship Education Program at Highlander Folk School, Robinson served as a teacher of literacy classes for the region's African Americans, connecting with her students on a personal level. Her discussion and teaching of daily, routine tasks and topics, such as sewing, cultivated a trust within this population. The implementation of literacy classes led to increased African American political knowledge of personal rights neglected by the American government. This understanding combined with trust in Robinson played a major role in gathering support for the civil rights movement and helped propel the movement's agenda.

== Notable women organizations ==
=== Womanpower Unlimited ===
Womanpower Unlimited, organized by civil rights activist Claire Collins Harvey, proved instrumental in providing necessary clothing and hygiene supplies to incarcerated Freedom Riders. The group formed vital networks of women that encouraged female participation within the civil rights movement in a variety of different areas, such as voter registration and racial integration in education.

== Navigating McCarthyism and the Cold War ==
=== Gender roles ===
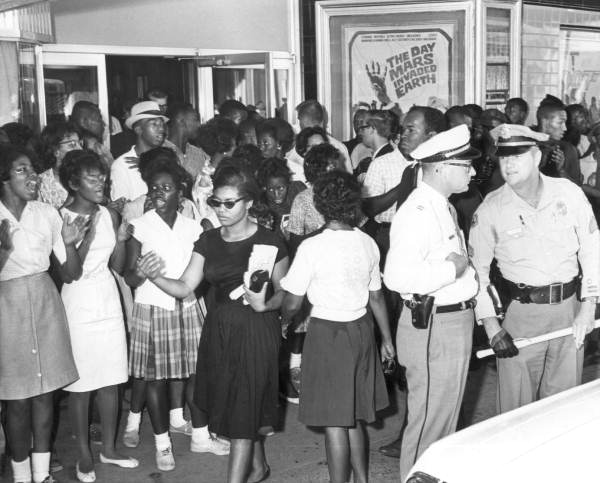
African American women participate in Civil Rights protest in Tallahassee, Florida, 1963

During the Cold War, upholding traditional gender roles maintained national security. Women were encouraged to prioritize motherhood and marriage, and the nuclear family was promoted as the ideal. African American women in the civil rights movement sometimes used this to their advantage, framing their activism as a protection of families. For example, when activist Ester Cooper Jackson's husband was forced into hiding due to accusations of being a revolutionary communist, Cooper Jackson criticized McCarthyism for the way it disrupted and separated families.

=== Repression ===
During the Cold War, the U.S. government became aware that racial discrimination in the country was harmful to American foreign relations. The USSR used racial inequality as propaganda to demonstrate the failures of American democracy. Concerned with the international perception of the United States as the subject of criticism of the USSR and other countries, the American government repressed and censored people who publicly critiqued America. Many activists suffered from this, including several notable African American women, for the government deemed their objection to racial discrimination in America as an attack on democracy and threatening to the ideal American image.

==== Josephine Baker ====
The entertainer and activist Josephine Baker used her platform to fight for racial equality. She vocalized her critiques of racial discrimination and segregation and refused to perform in segregated venues. Whilst on tour in Latin America, in addition to her performances, Baker gave lectures to her audiences about racism in America. The U.S. government disapproved of this, worried that Baker's words would encourage anti-America sentiment and propaganda. Accusations of being communist and un-American in the height of the Cold War put Baker's career in the Americas to a halt, and American immigration withdrew her right to travel freely. She was barred from the country for a decade, and her ability to tackle racial inequality and bring international awareness to the cause suffered.

== See also ==
- Civil Rights Movement
- Women's_suffrage
