= Septima Poinsette Clark =

American activist

- Born: Septima Poinsette; May 3, 1898; Charleston, South Carolina, U.S.
- Died: December 15, 1987 (aged 89); Johns Island, South Carolina, U.S.
- Organization(s): NAACP; SCLC
- Movement: Civil Rights Movement
- Spouse: Nerie David Clark
- Awards: Martin Luther King Jr. Award 1970; Living Legacy Award 1979; Drum Major for Justice Award 1987

Septima Poinsette Clark (May 3, 1898 – December 15, 1987) was an African American educator and civil rights activist. Clark developed the literacy and citizenship workshops that played an important role in the drive for voting rights and civil rights for African Americans in the Civil Rights Movement. Septima Clark's work was commonly under-appreciated by Southern male activists. She became known as the "Queen Mother" or "Grandmother" of the Civil Rights Movement in the United States. Martin Luther King Jr. commonly referred to Clark as "The Mother of the Movement". Clark's argument for her position in the Civil Rights Movement was one that claimed "knowledge could empower marginalized groups in ways that formal legal equality couldn't."

== Early life ==
Clark was born in Charleston, South Carolina, on May 3, 1898. Her life in Charleston was greatly affected by the era of Reconstruction, as well as power relations during the time. Charleston was strictly segregated and harshly divided by class. Her father, Peter Poinsette, was enslaved at birth on Joel Roberts Poinsett's plantation, called the White House, near Georgetown. Joel Roberts Poinsett was a distinguished US politician of his time and the namesake of the poinsettia plant. Peter was a house servant to Joel and his main task was taking the children to and from school each day. After slavery, Peter found a job working on a ship in the Charleston harbor. During one of his travels, he went to Haiti and it was then that Peter met Victoria, Clark's mother. The couple got married in Jacksonville, Florida, and then moved back to Charleston.

Her mother, Victoria Warren Anderson Poinsette, was born in Charleston but raised in Haiti by her brother, who took her and her two sisters there in 1864. Victoria Poinsette was also enslaved, but vowed to never be anyone's servant. She returned to Charleston after the Civil War and worked as a launderer. She raised her children very strictly, only permitting them to play with other children on one day of the week. She was also determined to make her daughters into ladies, so she told them never to go out without gloves on, never yell, never eat on the street, etc.

Victoria Warren Anderson Poinsette lived in a constant struggle of wanting to improve her social class; she wanted to live in a middle-class society but on a working-class budget. Victoria made it plain to Peter that he was not providing enough for her and their family. Victoria raised her children separated, with the boys having more lenient rules than the girls. The boys could have friends over and play many days of the week, but the girls had to do chores and lessons, every day other than Friday. Clark rebelled against her mother's strictness through never becoming the lady she wished her to be and marrying a man Victoria called a "stranger". Clark remembers only ever being punished by her father when she did not want to attend school; however, Clark's father was not able to write his own name until the later years of his life.

Clark's first educational experience was in 1904 at age six, when she started attending Mary Street School. All Clark did at this school was sit on a set of bleachers with a hundred other six-year-olds, learning nothing. Clark's mother quickly removed her from the school. An elderly woman across the street from their house was teaching girls, so Clark learned to read and write there. Due to Clark's poor financial status, she watched the woman's children every morning and afternoon in return for her tuition. At this time there was not a high school in Charleston for blacks; however, in 1914 a school opened for blacks in 6th, 7th, 8th grade. After sixth grade, she took a test and went on to ninth grade at the Avery Institute. All of the teachers were white women. In 1914, black teachers were hired and this brought much controversy to the city, which Clark later took part in through the NAACP.

Clark graduated from high school in 1916. Due to financial constraints, she was not able to attend college initially, so she took a state examination at the age of eighteen to allow her to teach. As an African American, she was barred from teaching in the Charleston, South Carolina public schools, but was able to find a position teaching in a rural school district, on John's Island, the largest of the Sea Islands. She taught on the islands from 1916 to 1919 at Promise Land School and then returned to Avery from 1919 to 1920. She was able to return to school part-time in Columbia, South Carolina to complete her B.A. at Benedict in 1942 and then she received her M.A. from Hampton. During this time, she taught children during the day and illiterate adults on her own time at night. During this period she developed innovative methods to rapidly teach adults to read and write, based on everyday materials like the Sears catalog.

Clark recalls the gross discrepancies that existed between her school and the white school across the street. Clark's school had 132 students and only one other teacher. As the teaching principal, Clark made $35 per week, while the other teacher made $25. Meanwhile, the white school across the street had only three students, and the teacher who worked there received $85 per week. It was her first-hand experience with these inequalities that led Clark to become an active proponent for pay equalization for teachers. In 1919 her pay equalization work brought her into the movement for civil rights. In an interview with Robert Penn Warren for the book Who Speaks for the Negro?, Clark explains how these experiences with her education, as well as her early experiences with growing up in a racist Charleston and teaching in the slums, prompted her to want to work towards civil rights.

== NAACP involvement ==
Clark first heard of the National Association for the Advancement of Colored People (NAACP) while she was teaching on John's Island from 1916 to 1919. There was no NAACP chapter on John's Island, but a meeting was held in which various preachers came and spoke about what the NAACP was and what exactly it was trying to do. The superintendent was in attendance to collect dues and it was then that she decided to join the organization.

In 1918, Clark returned to Charleston to teach sixth grade at Avery Normal Institute, a private academy for black children. She joined the local branch of the NAACP, and she was guided by artist and branch president Edwin A. Harleston in her early political activity.

Clark led her students around the city, going door-to-door, asking for signatures on a petition to allow black teachers in Charleston's public schools. In a citywide effort involving hundreds of volunteers, she helped garner more than 5,000 signatures of black heads of household to change the law. In 1920 black teachers were permitted in the city's public schools. In 1920, Clark enjoyed the first of many legal victories when blacks were given the right to become principals in Charleston's public schools, under the education board of aldermen of Charleston. In 1945, Clark worked with Thurgood Marshall on a case that was about equal pay for white and black teachers led by NAACP in Columbia, South Carolina.

The late-1940s proved to be a difficult time for Clark as she stood up for the NAACP's aim of equalization to integration against many other members and activists.

== Marriage and children ==
While teaching at Avery from 1919 to 1920, Clark met Nerie David Clark. He worked as a warden cook on a submarine in the navy during World War I. In late 1920, she went to teach in McClellanville until 1922. She and Nerie wrote letters back and forth and dated for approximately three years. In 1923, they were married in McClellanville and then shortly moved to Hickory, North Carolina, Nerie's hometown. Clark's mother was disgraced by her marriage. Victoria believed that to marry any man outside of the state is to marry a stranger. She refused to have her in-laws for dinner or for any occasion. The marriage severed Victoria and Septima's relationship.

While living in Hickory with Nerie's family, Clark became aware of the many cultural and ideal differences they had. They grew up in different worlds; a mountain man and a low-country girl. In Hickory, Clark attended the same church as Nerie's family, which was an African Methodist church. She found this church to be much more of a community than her church in Charleston, the United Methodist Church. Throughout Clark's religious journey in life, she found that there are many ways to serve God, rather than only one correct way. Clark got homesick, so they moved back to Charleston, where she taught at Promise Land again from 1926 to 1929.

In Charleston, they had their first child, who died. Clark viewed the death of her baby as a punishment to her because she married a man not from South Carolina. Her mother was not sympathetic and refused to help her; however, her father was friendlier towards her. To get over her lost baby, she took a job with a white woman for a summer. They stayed in the mountains for the summer and the woman was helpless, which gave Clark optimism and hope. She then moved to Columbia and began teaching in 1929. It was in Columbia she got much more involved in civic activities.

She settled in Columbia, South Carolina in 1929, and accepted a teaching position that year. In total, Septima Clark spent a total of 17 years in Columbia, South Carolina. Much of her work there is documented by the University of South Carolina History Department which, under the direction of B. J. Donaldson, has conducted extensive research on African-American education, with special emphasis on the history of the Booker T. Washington High School.

In 1929, Septima Clark was employed at Booker T. Washington where she is still remembered as an outstanding educator. She worked closely with the principals of Booker T. Washington High School, both C. A. Johnson who recruited her for the teaching position she would hold for 17 years and later with J. Andrew Simmons, who was originally from Charleston and whom she may have known previous to their working together in Columbia.

While in Columbia, Septima Clark completed the foundations upon which her career, reputation, and memory would rest: she became a highly valued faculty member at Booker T. Washington High School, she completed her bachelor's degree at Columbia's Benedict College, and she completed her graduate studies at New York's Columbia University and Atlanta's Clark College. The level and quality of the education that Septima Clark achieved was typical of what was required by the administrators of the Booker T. Washington High School of Columbia who recruited highly trained teachers from all over the country.

After J. Andrew Simmons left Booker T. Washington High School to take a position in New York in 1945, Septima Clark stayed on for two additional years, before finally leaving Booker T. Washington High School, an institution she had helped to mold, in order to return to Charleston to take care of her ailing mother, Victoria. During this time, Clark had trouble providing for Nerie Jr. In 1935, she decided to send him back to Hickory to live with his paternal grandparents. Clark's decision to send Nerie Jr. to live with his paternal grandparents was a common action at this time due to the Great Depression and its resulting financial issues. Septima Poinsette Clark's marriage to Nerie David Clark resulted in a course of depression for Clark, as well as a significant decline in her self-confidence.

== Columbia University and NAACP leadership ==
During summers, Clark began studies at Columbia University in New York, and at Atlanta University in Georgia with the landmark figure in the racial equality movement, W. E. B. Du Bois. Between 1942 and 1945, she received a bachelor's degree from Benedict College, Columbia, S.C., and a master's degree from Hampton (Virginia) Institute (now Hampton University). While earning her bachelor's degree, she took classes in the morning, taught from noon to five, and took more classes in the evenings. She was earning $62.50 per month in college, and every summer she traveled to Maine to earn more money. The NAACP in Columbia, SC, had approximately 800 members and all were black. The biggest NAACP impact during Clark's time in Columbia was that they sponsored a suit that won the equalization of teacher salaries. It was a huge win for the NAACP.

In 1947, Clark returned to Charleston to take care of her mother, who had had a stroke. While caring for her mother, Clark's role as an educator and activist did not subside. During this time, she taught in the Charleston public schools, she was active with the YWCA, and served as membership chairperson of the Charleston NAACP. The YWCA was one of the few organizations in Charleston that was interracial. There were black and white branches. In 1956, Clark obtained the position of vice president of the Charleston NAACP branch.

That same year, the South Carolina legislature passed a law banning city or state employees from being involved with civil rights organizations. Clark believed that a combination of relations, such as social and power relations, were a major contributor to schooling. Clark was upfront in her refusal to leave the NAACP, and was thus fired from her job by the Charleston City School Board, losing her pension after 40 years employment. She soon found that no school in Charleston would hire her. A black teachers' sorority held a fundraiser for her benefit, but no member would have their picture taken with her, fearing that they would lose their own jobs.

== Highlander Folk School literacy courses ==
Around this time, Clark was active with the Highlander Folk School in Monteagle, Tennessee. She first attended a workshop there in 1954. Myles Horton, the founder of Highlander, quickly hired her as the full-time director of workshops. Before long she was teaching literacy courses, drawing on her experience on John's Island. "In a compressed week's workshop, Clark promised to turn sharecroppers and other unschooled Negros into potential voters".

Highlander was one of the few interracial schools in the South at the time and Clark prospered as a teacher there. After being fired and unwelcomed in her hometown, Clark found Highlander to be a great community. In 1959, while she was teaching at Highlander she was arrested for allegedly "possessing whiskey"; however, these charges were later dropped and seen as false.

Clark and her cousin, Bernice Robinson, expanded and spread the program. They taught students how to fill out driver's license exams, voter registration forms, Sears mail-order forms, and how to sign checks. In 1965, Clark estimated that these "citizenship schools" had reached more than 25,000 students and led to around twice that number of registered voters. Additionally, many of the students became teachers themselves. Clark also served as Highlander's director of workshops, recruiting teachers and students. One of the participants in her workshops was Rosa Parks. A few months after participating in the workshops Parks helped to start the Montgomery bus boycott. Many other women who took part in the Montgomery bus boycott also attended Highlander and participated in Clark's workshops. Upon seeing the success of Clark, Ella Baker traveled to Highlander as a representative of SCLC and observed to see if Clark's program could be incorporated into SCLC's Crusade for Citizenship.

== The spread of Citizenship Schools ==
Clark is most famous for establishing "Citizenship Schools" teaching reading to adults throughout the Deep South, in hopes of carrying on a tradition. The creation of citizenship schools developed from Septima Clark's teaching of adult literacy courses throughout the interwar years. While the project served to increase literacy, it also served as a means to empower Black communities. Her teaching approach was very specific in making sure her students felt invested in what they were learning. She connected the politics of the movement to the personal experiences and needs of the people. In this way, Clark's strategy aligned with Paulo Freire's critical pedagogy.

She was not only teaching literacy, but also citizenship rights. Clark's goals for the schools were to instill both personal and cultural pride, literacy, and a sense of one's citizenship rights. She recruited the rural communities to get involved with the movement. Citizenship schools were frequently taught in the back rooms of shop so as to elude the violence of racist whites.

The teachers of citizenship schools were often people who had learned to read as adults as well, as one of the primary goals of the citizenship schools was to develop more local leaders for people's movements. Teaching people how to read helped countless Black Southerners push for the right to vote, but beyond that, it also developed leaders across the country who would help push the civil rights movement long after 1964. The citizenship schools are just one example of the empowerment strategy for developing leaders that was core to the civil rights movement in the South The citizenship schools are also seen as a form of support to Martin Luther King Jr. in the nonviolent Civil Rights Movement.

The project was a response to legislation in Southern states which required literacy and interpreting various portions of the US Constitution in order to be allowed to register to vote. These laws were used to disenfranchise black citizens. Citizenship Schools were based on the adult literacy programs Clark and Robinson had developed at Highlander. They required a week's worth of training in a program that was ultimately designed by Clark. Septima Clark hired her cousin Bernice Robinson, to be the first teacher. Bernice was also a Highlander alumna. In addition to literacy, Citizenship Schools also taught students to act collectively and protest against racism.

The leadership schools ultimately spread to a number of Southern states, growing so large that, upon the recommendation of Myles Horton and Clark, the program was transferred to the Southern Christian Leadership Conference (SCLC), in 1961 though initially Martin Luther King Jr. was hesitant about the idea. Transferring the program to the SCLC was also a result of financial troubles at Highlander Folk School in Tennessee. With the increased budget of the SCLC, the citizenship school project trained over 10,000 citizenship school teachers who led citizenship schools throughout the South, representing a popular education effort on a massive scale On top of these 10,000 teachers, citizenship schools reached out and taught more than 25,000 people. By 1958, 37 adults were able to pass the voter registration test as a result of the first session of community schools. Before 1969, about 700,000 African Americans became registered voters thanks to Clark's dedication to the movement. Clark came to national prominence, becoming the SCLC's director of education and teaching.

Clark was the first woman to gain a position on the SCLC board. Andrew Young, who had joined Highlander the previous year to work with the Citizenship Schools, also joined the SCLC staff. The SCLC staff of citizenship schools were mainly women, as a result of the daily experience gained by becoming a teacher.

Clark would struggle against sexism during her time on the SCLC, as had Ella Baker, with the bulk of sexism emanating from Martin Luther King Jr. Ralph Abernathy also objected to her, as Clark said:

"I can remember Reverend Abernathy asking many times, why was Septima Clark on the Executive Board of the Southern Christian Leadership Conference? And Dr. King would always say, 'She was the one who proposed this citizenship education which is bringing to us not only money but a lot of people who will register and vote.' And he asked that many times. It was hard for him to see a woman on that executive body."

Clark claimed that women being treated unequally was "one of the greatest weaknesses of the civil rights movement."

== Other civic service ==
During her career in service organizations, she also worked with the Tuberculosis Association and the Charleston Health Department. She was also an active member of Alpha Kappa Alpha sorority. Clark retired from active work with the SCLC in 1970. She later sought reinstatement of the pension and back salary that had been canceled when she was dismissed as a teacher in 1956, which she won. She was later to serve two terms on the Charleston County School Board.

== Death and legacy ==
In 1978, Clark was awarded an honorary doctorate of humane letters by the College of Charleston. U.S. President Jimmy Carter awarded Clark a Living Legacy Award in 1979. In 1987, her second autobiography, Ready from Within: Septima Clark and the Civil Rights Movement (Wild Trees Press, 1986) won the American Book Award.

Septima P. Clark died on December 15, 1987. In a eulogy presented at the funeral, the president of the Southern Christian Leadership Conference (SCLC) described the importance of Clark's work and her relationship to the SCLC. Reverend Joseph Lowery asserted that "her courageous and pioneering efforts in the area of citizenship education and interracial cooperation" won her SCLC's highest award, the Drum Major for Justice Award. She is buried at Old Bethel United Methodist Church Cemetery in Charleston, South Carolina.

Clark had major relations to other black activists of the Civil Rights Movement, such as Booker T. Washington and W. E. B. DuBois. Washington and Clark both emphasized the importance of self-improvement before the importance of institutional reforms. DuBois and Clark agreed on the emphasis of education as the most important approach to the civil rights movement.

Septima Clark Public Charter School in Washington, DC, is named in her honor. Septima P. Clark Parkway (also known as the Septima P. Clark Expressway) and Septima P. Clark Memorial Park in Charleston, S.C. are named in her honor.

Minor planet 6238 Septimaclark, discovered by Eleanor Helin is named in her honor. The official naming citation was published by the Minor Planet Center on 8 November 2019 (M.P.C. 117229).

In 2020, Clark was honored by South Carolina by being featured on the reverse of the American Innovation series of $1 coins.

== Quotes ==
I have a great belief in the fact that whenever there is chaos, it creates wonderful thinking. I consider chaos a gift.

Don't ever think that everything went right. It didn't.

This country was built up from women keeping their mouths shut.

I never felt that getting angry would do you any good other than hurt your own digestion- keep you from eating, which I liked to do.

== Autobiographies ==
Septima Clark wrote two autobiographies during her lifetime, in which she recorded her lifelong experiences. The first, written in 1962, was named Echo In My Soul. It is a combination of her life story, as well as her work at the Highlander Folk School. The work also discussed her views concerning the Jim Crow laws and the legitimacy of the Civil Rights Movement. Clark's second autobiography, Ready from Within (1979), was an oral recollection of lifelong experiences.
