= Bernice Robinson =

American Civil Rights activist and educator (1914–1994)

- Born: Bernice Violanthe Robinson; February 7, 1914; Charleston, Charleston County, South Carolina
- Died: September 3, 1994 (aged 80); Charleston, South Carolina
- Occupations: beauty culturist, civil rights activist
- Years active: 1936–1982
- Known for: establishing Citizenship Schools and registering voters throughout the American South

Bernice Robinson (1914–1994) was an American activist in the Civil Rights Movement and education proponent who helped establish adult Citizenship Schools in South Carolina. Becoming field supervisor of adult education for the Southern Christian Leadership Conference (SCLC), she led political education workshops throughout the south, in Alabama, Louisiana, Mississippi, Tennessee, and other states to teach adult reading skills so that black people would be able to pass literacy tests to vote. Between 1970 and 1975, Robinson worked for the South Carolina Commission for Farm Workers, supervising VISTA workers and directing day care centers. In both 1972 and 1974, she unsuccessfully ran for the South Carolina House of Representatives, becoming the first African American woman to run for a political office in the state.

== Early life ==
Bernice Violanthe Robinson was born on February 7, 1914, in Charleston, South Carolina to Martha Elizabeth (née Anderson) and James C. Robinson. Martha, sister to Septima Clark′s mother, was a seamstress and James was a bricklayer. Robinson was the ninth and youngest child in the family and attended Simonton Elementary School. She went on to further her education at the segregated Burke Industrial School, completing the ninth grade, the maximum education allowed for African Americans at that time. In 1929, she moved to Harlem to join an older sister, who was living there and the following year married Thomas Leroy Robinson. She completed her high school education at the Wadleigh High School for Girls and dreamed of continuing her education at the Boston Conservatory of Music. When her sister became ill and unable to support them, the girls returned to Charleston, where Robinson had a daughter and divorced before returning to New York in 1936.

== Career ==
Upon her return to New York, Robinson found work in the garment district, working during the day as a seamstress and attending night school at the Poro School of Cosmetology. She eventually opened her own beauty salon and though Robinson worked long hours, enjoyed the financial independence the shop offered. The shop became a meeting place for neighbors and led to her meeting politicians and activists. She registered to vote and became politically active for the first time, mailing flyers for a local assemblyman. In 1945, Robinson took real estate courses while in New York.

In 1947, Robinson returned to Charleston to care for her aging parents. She opened another beauty shop and along with her mother took in sewing for extra money. She joined the local National Association for the Advancement of Colored People (NAACP) branch and worked with them as a secretary and the Chair of Membership. She used her shop as the center of her activism, not only to make contacts, but allowing her clients to have mail sent to the shop so that postal carriers would not be aware of their private business. In 1955, the United Nations held a workshop on school desegregation, which Robinson attended. Esau Jenkins and her cousin, Septima Clark were inspired by the meeting, and began to make plans of how they could increase activism on Johns Island. The workshop opened Robinson's eyes for the first time to the problem of illiteracy and the limitations of being able to only register voters who could read. Jenkins and Clark convinced a reluctant Robinson that she was the perfect person to run an experimental education program because she did not have formal training as a teacher and would not have preconceived notions of structure or curriculum. Beauticians were also highly regarded in civil rights work because they had community respect as entrepreneurs and activists, but were also known as good listeners and were unlikely to face backlash from white employers since they were self-employed. It also helped that Robinson had a fairly good knowledge of Gullah, the creole language spoken on the island.

After very little training at the Highlander Folk School on basic human rights, a room was hired and Robinson held her first class on January 7, 1957. Discarding materials for children's education, she taught the students how to read labels on canned goods, how to fill out paperwork, read newspapers, and other tasks they needed for their daily lives. After three months of instruction, the final exam was for the students to register to vote. Eighty percent of her students passed. The schools became known as Citizenship Schools and sprang up throughout the southern United States, after the program was transferred from Highlander to the Southern Christian Leadership Conference (SCLC). Robinson continued giving volunteer instruction and training others as teachers. She taught classes in states like Alabama, Louisiana, Mississippi, Tennessee and became the supervisor of the Low Country Citizenship Schools. In 1967, she enrolled in a correspondent course in Community Development through the University of Wisconsin–Madison and later completed a similar course in interior design.

In 1970, Robinson left the SCLC and went to work for the South Carolina Commission for Farm Workers (SCCFW), supervising VISTA volunteers. The work centered on development of day care and childhood development centers for communities on Edisto Island, Johns Island, Wadmalaw Island, and Yonges Island. Between 1971 and 1973, she directed the creation of the Yonges Island Day Care Center. In both 1972 and 1974, she launched unsuccessful bids for the state House of Representatives, but became the first African American woman to vie for public office. In 1975, Robinson returned to the SCCFW to direct programs for migrant workers' day care. She became a loan and relocation officer at the Charleston County Community Development Department in 1979 and retained that position until her 1982 retirement.

== Death and legacy ==
Robinson died September 3, 1994, in Charleston, South Carolina. In 1991, Eliot Wigginton published Refuse to Stand Silently by: An Oral History of Grass Roots Social Activism in America, 1921–1964, which included oral history from Robinson and other activists involved in the Civil Rights Movement. Robinson's personal archive of papers was donated in 1989 to the Avery Research Center at the College of Charleston. In 2011, a critical review of the career of Robinson was made by Clare Russell. In her essay, A beautician without teacher training: Bernice Robinson, citizenship schools and women in the Civil Rights Movement, Russell argues that Robinson has been inadequately studied and her legacy misrepresented. Rather than an untrained teacher, Russell evaluates Robinson based on her broad education and work experience.
