= Crusade for Citizenship =

Crusade for Citizenship was the 1958 voter project organized by the Southern Christian Leadership Conference (SCLC). The goal of the project was to double the number of African-American voters in the southern United States for the 1958 and 1960 elections. It was initially organized by Ella Baker as Associate Director of the SCLC, and Reverend John Tilley as the first Executive Director. While encouraging discussion and actions related to voter registration, it did not meet its goal of creating a mass movement. Southern registrars resisted registering African Americans and many blacks were reluctant or fearful to challenge existing exclusions under Jim Crow society.
