= Freedom Riders =

American civil rights activists of the 1960s

- Part of the civil rights movement
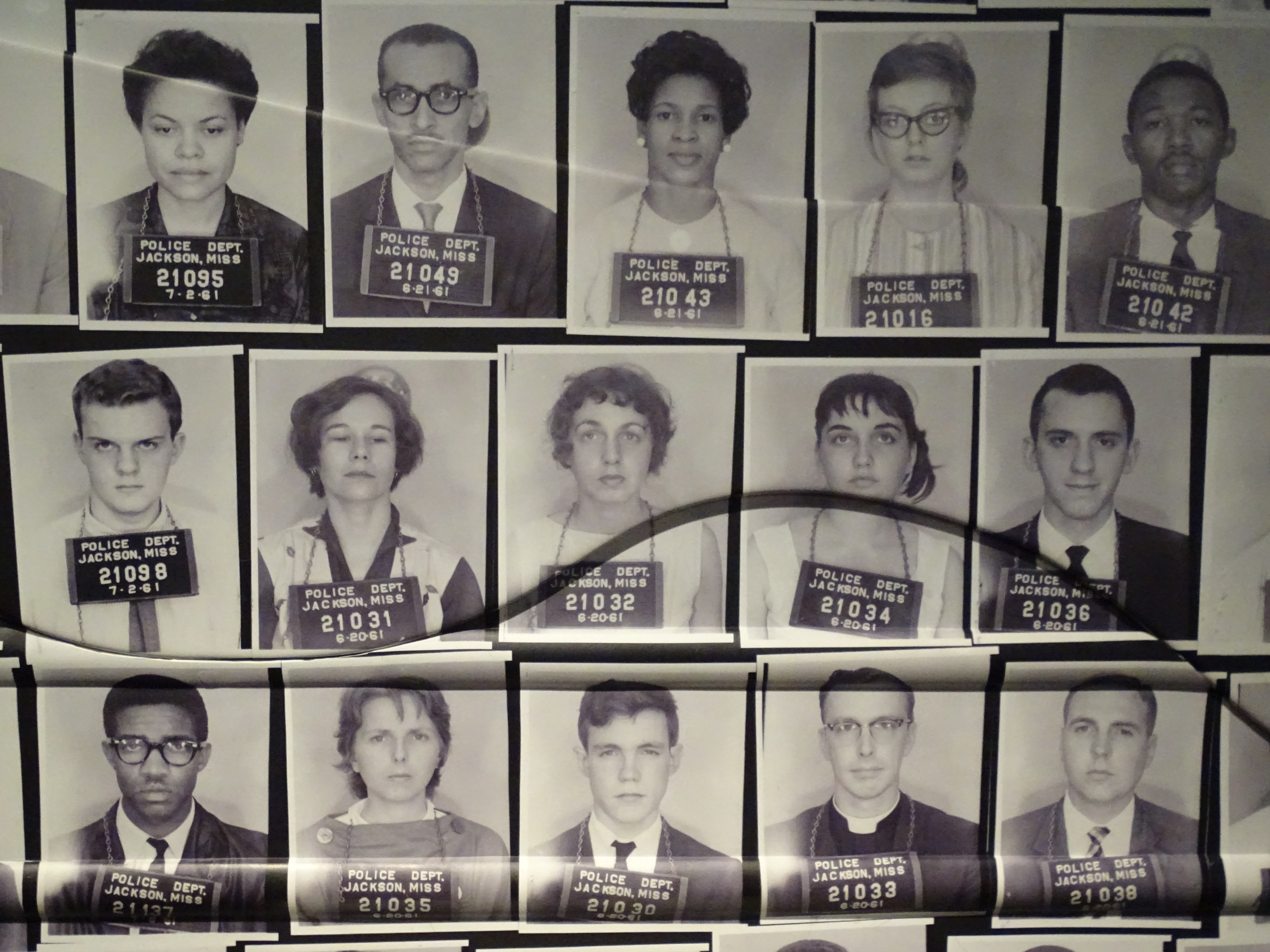
- Mugshots of Freedom Riders, as displayed at the Center for Civil and Human Rights in Atlanta, Georgia
- Date: May 4 – December 10, 1961 (7 months and 6 days)
- Location: Southern United States, First Baptist Church, Parchman Farm and Jackson, Mississippi
- Caused by: Plessy v. Ferguson (1896); Racial segregation in interstate and intrastate transportation and public accommodations; Failed compliance with ruling Morgan v. Virginia (1946); Journey of Reconciliation in 1947; Sarah Keys v. Carolina Coach Company (1955); Ongoing boycott and sit-in demonstrations in the south; Boynton v. Virginia (1960)
- Result: 436 individuals participated in at least 60 separate Freedom Rides; First time "jail, no bail" tactic employed on large scale since the Nashville sit-ins; Desegregation order from Interstate Commerce Commission (ICC); Congress of Racial Equality (CORE) recognized as a serious civil rights organization; Creation of Route 40 campaign, Eastern Shore project, and Freedom Highways campaign; Voter Education Project established

Parties
Congress of Racial Equality (CORE); Student Nonviolent Coordinating Committee (SNCC); Nashville Student Movement; National Association for the Advancement of Colored People (NAACP)	Governor of Mississippi; Governor of Alabama; Birmingham Police Commissioner; Ku Klux Klan (KKK)

Lead figures
CORE members: James Farmer; Gordon Carey; SNCC and Nashville Student Movement members: Diane Nash; John Lewis; James Lawson; Bernard Lafayette; James Bevel	Governors: Ross Barnett; John M. Patterson; City of Birmingham: Eugene "Bull" Connor; Tom Cook

Freedom Riders were civil rights activists who rode interstate buses into the segregated Southern United States in 1961 and subsequent years to challenge the non-enforcement of the United States Supreme Court decisions Morgan v. Virginia (1946) and Boynton v. Virginia (1960), which ruled that segregated public buses were unconstitutional. The Southern states had ignored the rulings and the federal government had done nothing to enforce them. The first Freedom Ride left Washington, D.C., on May 4, 1961, and was scheduled to arrive in New Orleans on May 17.

Boynton outlawed racial segregation in the restaurants and waiting rooms in terminals serving buses that crossed state lines. Five years prior to the Boynton ruling, the Interstate Commerce Commission (ICC) had issued a ruling in Sarah Keys v. Carolina Coach Company (1955) that had explicitly denounced the Plessy v. Ferguson (1896) doctrine of separate but equal in interstate bus travel. The ICC failed to enforce its ruling, and Jim Crow travel laws remained in force throughout the South.

The Freedom Riders challenged this status quo by riding interstate buses in the South in mixed racial groups to challenge local laws or customs that enforced segregation in seating. The Freedom Rides and the violent reactions they provoked bolstered the American civil rights movement, calling national attention to the disregard for federal law and the violence used to enforce segregation in the southern United States. Police arrested riders for trespassing, unlawful assembly, violating state and local Jim Crow laws, and other alleged offenses, but often they first let white mobs of counter-protestors attack the riders without intervention.

The Congress of Racial Equality (CORE) sponsored most of the subsequent Freedom Rides, but some were also organized by the Student Nonviolent Coordinating Committee (SNCC). The Freedom Rides, beginning in 1961, followed dramatic sit-ins against segregated lunch counters conducted by students and youth throughout the South, and boycotts of retail establishments that maintained segregated facilities.

The Supreme Court's decision in Boynton supported the right of interstate travelers to disregard local segregation ordinances. Southern local and state police considered the actions of the Freedom Riders to be criminal and arrested them in some locations. In some localities, such as Birmingham, Alabama, the police cooperated with Ku Klux Klan chapters and other white people opposing the actions, and allowed mobs to attack the riders.

== History ==
=== Prelude ===
The Freedom Riders were inspired by the 1947 Journey of Reconciliation, led by Bayard Rustin and George Houser and co-sponsored by the Fellowship of Reconciliation and the then-fledgling Congress of Racial Equality (CORE). Like the Freedom Rides of 1961, the Journey of Reconciliation was intended to test an earlier Supreme Court ruling that banned racial discrimination in interstate travel. Rustin, Igal Roodenko, Joe Felmet and Andrew Johnnson, were arrested and sentenced to serve on a chain gang in North Carolina for violating local Jim Crow laws regarding segregated seating on public transportation.

The first Freedom Ride began on May 4, 1961. Led by CORE Director James Farmer, 13 young riders (seven black, six white, including but not limited to John Lewis (21), Genevieve Hughes (28), Mae Frances Moultrie, Joseph Perkins, Charles Person (18), Ivor Moore, William E. Harbour (19), Joan Trumpauer Mullholland (19), and Ed Blankenheim), left Washington, DC, on Greyhound (from the Greyhound Terminal) and Trailways buses. Their plan was to ride through Virginia, the Carolinas, Georgia, Alabama, and Mississippi, ending in New Orleans, Louisiana, where a civil rights rally was planned. Many of the Riders were sponsored by CORE and SNCC with 75% of the Riders between 18 and 30 years old. A diverse group of volunteers came from 39 states, and were from different economic classes and racial backgrounds. Most were college students and received training in nonviolent tactics.

The Freedom Riders' tactics were to have at least one interracial pair sitting in adjoining seats, and at least one black rider sitting up front, where seats had been reserved for white customers by local custom throughout the South. The rest of the team would sit scattered throughout the rest of the bus. One rider would abide by the South's segregation rules in order to avoid arrest and to contact CORE and arrange bail for those who were arrested.

Only minor trouble was encountered in Virginia and North Carolina, but John Lewis was attacked in Rock Hill, South Carolina. More than 300 Riders were arrested in Charlotte, North Carolina; Winnsboro, South Carolina; and Jackson, Mississippi.

=== Lives as Freedom Riders ===
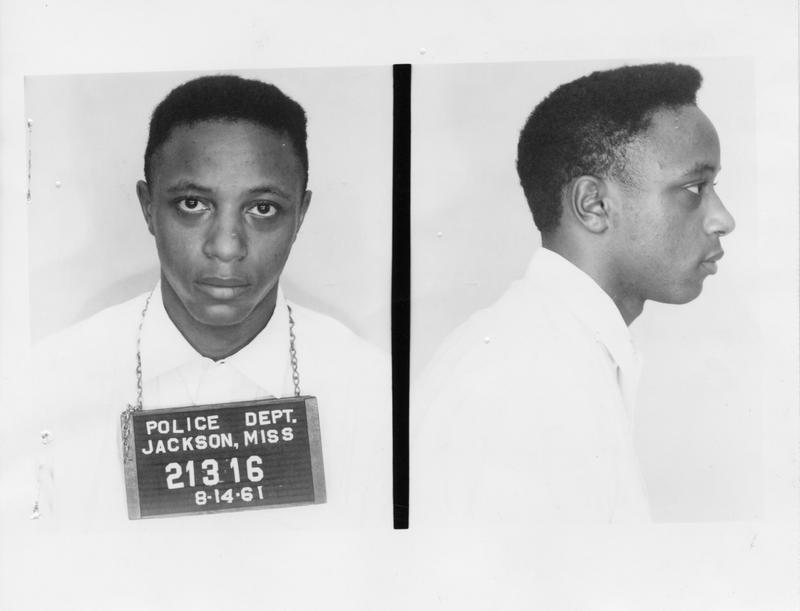
George Raymond Jr. was a CORE activist arrested in the Trailways bus terminal in Jackson, Mississippi, on August 14, 1961.

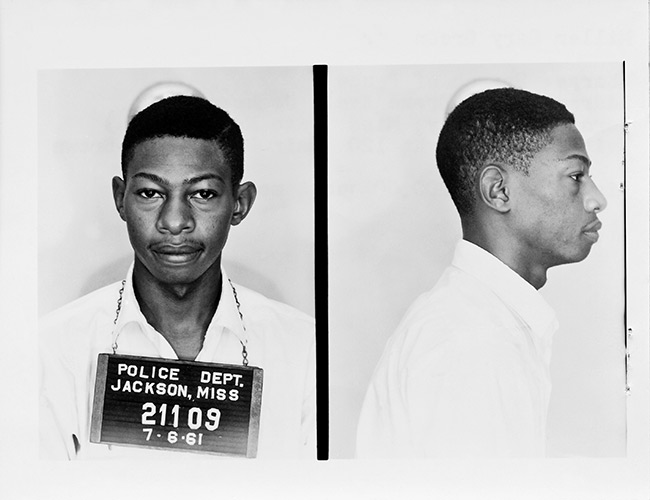
Mugshot of Miller G. Green when arrested for being a part of The Freedom Rides

The Freedom Rides occurred during the spring and summer of 1961. However, the idea of an interracial bus ride through the South, at a time when racial segregation was mandated in public transportation, originated in 1947. Bayard Rustin and George Houser, who were part of a civil rights organization called the Congress of Racial Equality (CORE), came up with a plan to test whether southern long-distance buses were following a 1946 Supreme Court ruling that prohibited segregation on interstate travel.

"Yet the Freedom Rides, in plural, was just the beginning. The Alabama attacks, coupled with the Mississippi arrests, inspired multiple small bands of civil rights supporters from all over the continental United States to head southward too," explains Arsenault.

The riders in 1961 successfully completed their journey through Virginia, the Carolinas, and Georgia. However, they encountered violence in Alabama. A white segregationist mob attacked and burned one of the two buses they were traveling in outside Anniston. The second group of riders faced violence from Ku Klux Klansmen in Birmingham, while the city police deliberately held back.

Due to the pressure from Robert Kennedy's Justice Department, the Interstate Commerce Commission (ICC), which had regulatory power over interstate buses and terminals, declared an end to racial segregation in all waiting rooms and lunch counters, effective from November 1, 1961. Although not everyone immediately followed this rule, Arsenault points out that this directive sent a clear message to southern whites that desegregation of other institutions was likely to happen soon.

=== Mob violence in Anniston and Birmingham ===
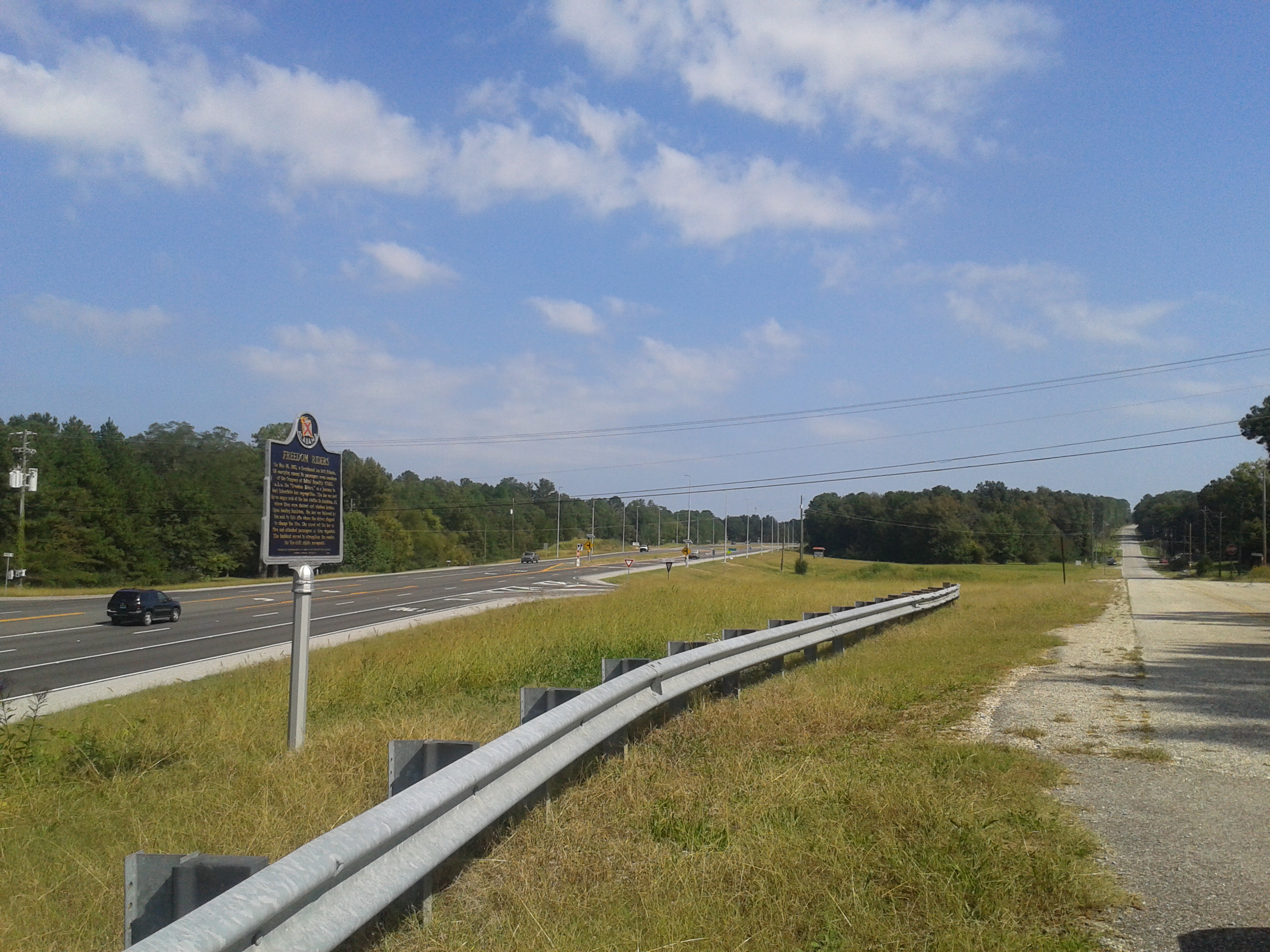
The Greyhound bus attack site (center) is south of Anniston on Old Birmingham Highway (right). See Freedom Riders National Monument (2017 photo)

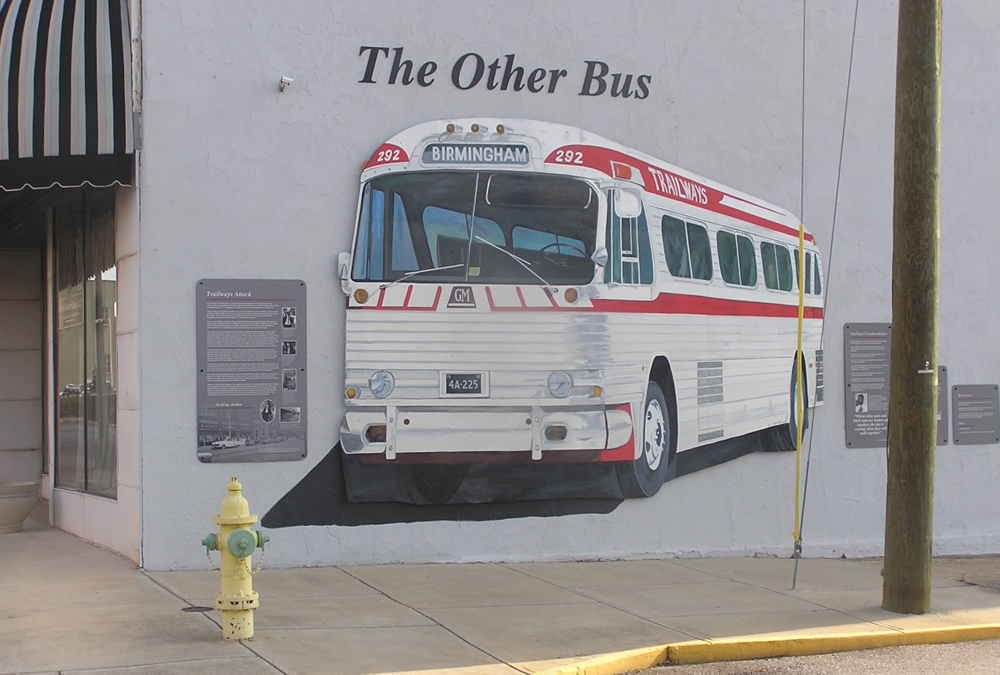
Violence at the Anniston Trailways Terminal, at 901 Noble St., is commemorated with a mural (2012 photo)

The Birmingham, Alabama, Police Commissioner, Bull Connor, together with Police Sergeant Tom Cook (an avid Ku Klux Klan supporter), organized violence against the Freedom Riders with local Klan chapters. The pair made plans to bring the Ride to an end in Alabama. They assured Gary Thomas Rowe, an FBI informer and member of Eastview Klavern #13 (the most violent Klan group in Alabama), that the mob would have fifteen minutes to attack the Freedom Riders without any arrests being made. The plan was to allow an initial assault in Anniston with a final assault taking place in Birmingham.

==== Anniston ====
On Sunday, May 14, 1961, Mother's Day, in Anniston, Alabama, a mob of Klansmen, some still in church attire, attacked the first of the two Greyhound buses. The driver tried to leave the station, but he was blocked until KKK members slashed its tires. The mob forced the crippled bus to stop several miles outside town and then threw a firebomb into it. As the bus burned, the mob held the doors shut, intending to burn the riders to death. Sources disagree, but either an exploding fuel tank or an undercover state investigator who was brandishing a revolver caused the mob to retreat, and the riders escaped the bus. The mob beat the riders after they got out. Warning shots which were fired into the air by highway patrolmen were the only thing which prevented the riders from being lynched. The roadside site in Anniston and the downtown Greyhound station were preserved as part of the Freedom Riders National Monument in 2017.

Some injured riders were taken to Anniston Memorial Hospital. That night, the hospitalized Freedom Riders, most of whom had been refused care, were removed from the hospital at 2 am, because the staff feared the mob outside the hospital. The local civil rights leader Rev. Fred Shuttlesworth organized several cars of black citizens to rescue the injured Freedom Riders in defiance of the white supremacists. The black people were under the leadership of Colonel Stone Johnson and were openly armed as they arrived at the hospital, protecting the Freedom Riders from the mob.

When the Trailways bus reached Anniston and pulled in at the terminal an hour after the Greyhound bus was burned, it was boarded by eight Klansmen. They beat the Freedom Riders and left them semi-conscious in the back of the bus.

==== Birmingham ====
On Sunday morning, May 14, the Freedom Riders embarked on a journey from Atlanta in two buses that also accommodated regular passengers. However, the first bus was unable to reach Birmingham as it was attacked by a group of 200 men. The attackers hurled a firebomb through a rear window of the bus, and the Freedom Riders were taken to a nearby hospital, where they were mostly ignored until being instructed to leave. The bus was left completely destroyed, and this became the first memorable image of the Freedom Ride.

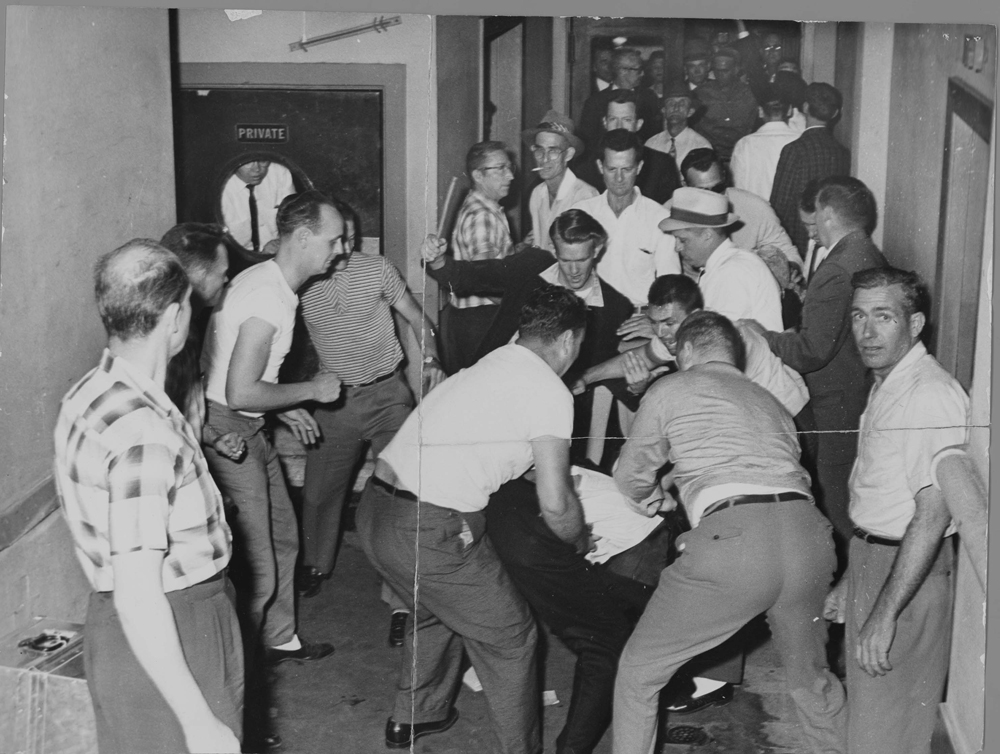
A mob of white people beat Freedom Riders in Birmingham, Alabama. This picture was reclaimed by the FBI from a local journalist who also was beaten and whose camera was smashed.

When the bus arrived in Birmingham, it was attacked by a mob of KKK members aided and abetted by police under the orders of Commissioner Connor. As the riders exited the bus, they were beaten by the mob with baseball bats, iron pipes and bicycle chains. Among the attacking Klansmen was Gary Thomas Rowe Jr., an FBI informant. White Freedom Riders were singled out for especially frenzied beatings; James Peck required more than 50 stitches to the wounds in his head. Peck was taken to Carraway Methodist Medical Center, which refused to treat him; he was later treated at Jefferson Hillman Hospital.

On the afternoon of that same Sunday, the second bus arrived at Birmingham's Trailways station, with James Peck as the captain of this leg. Peck, a 46-year-old descendant of the Peck & Peck New York retail family and one of the two Harvard alums on the ride, had participated in CORE'S 1947 Journey of Reconciliation, where he was surprised by the level of tolerance towards integration among drivers and passengers. However, fourteen years later, he faced a hostile group of white men in sports shirts, who carried lead pipes hidden in paper bags. Peck challenged them, declaring that they would have to kill him before hurting his fellow Freedom Riders. Despite his brave words, he was attacked and severely beaten by five men in an alley. The attackers used a Coke bottle, which was a typical weapon for southern vigilantes. Peck lost consciousness within seconds and needed 53 stitches to close his exposed skull. Meanwhile, inside the station, the Klansmen violently assaulted the Freedom Riders and anyone else who tried to stop them, including a news photographer who arrived at the scene.

When reports of the bus burning and beatings reached the U.S. Attorney General, Robert F. Kennedy, he urged restraint on the part of Freedom Riders and sent an assistant, John Seigenthaler, to Alabama to try to calm the situation.

Despite the violence suffered and the threat of more to come, the Freedom Riders intended to continue their journey. Kennedy had arranged an escort for the Riders in order to get them to Montgomery, Alabama, safely. However, radio reports told of a mob awaiting the riders at the bus terminal, as well as on the route to Montgomery. The Greyhound clerks told the Riders that their drivers were refusing to drive any Freedom Riders anywhere.

=== New Orleans ===
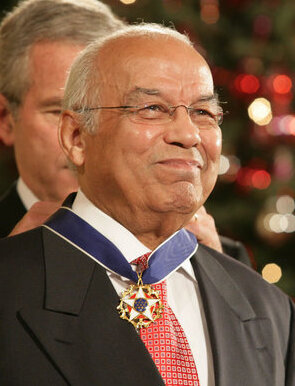
Dr. Norman Francis, who as Dean of Men at Xavier University of Louisiana secretly sheltered the Freedom Riders at St. Michael's Hall upon their arrival in New Orleans in May 1961.

Recognizing that their efforts had already called national attention to the civil rights cause and wanting to get to the rally in New Orleans, the Riders decided to abandon the rest of the bus ride and fly directly to New Orleans from Birmingham. When they first boarded the plane, all passengers had to exit because of a bomb threat.

Upon arriving in New Orleans, local tensions prevented normal accommodations—after which Norman C. Francis, president of Xavier University of Louisiana (XULA), decided to secretly shelter them on campus in St Michael's Hall, a dormitory.

=== Nashville Student Movement continuation ===
Diane Nash, a Nashville college student who was a leader of the Nashville Student Movement and SNCC, believed that if Southern violence were allowed to halt the Freedom Rides the movement would be set back years. She pushed to find replacements to resume the rides. On May 17, a new set of riders, 10 students from Nashville who were active in the Nashville Student Movement, took a bus to Birmingham, where they were arrested by Bull Connor and jailed.

The students kept their spirits up in jail by singing freedom songs. Out of frustration, Connor drove them back up to the Tennessee line and dropped them off, saying, "I just couldn't stand their singing." They immediately returned to Birmingham.

=== Mob violence in Montgomery ===
In answer to SNCC's call, Freedom Riders from across the Eastern US joined John Lewis and Hank Thomas, the two young SNCC members of the original Ride, who had remained in Birmingham. On May 19, they attempted to resume the ride, but, terrified by the howling mob surrounding the bus depot, the drivers refused. Harassed and besieged by the mob, the riders waited all night for a bus.

Under intense public pressure from the Kennedy administration, Greyhound was forced to provide a driver. After direct intervention by Byron White of the Attorney General's office, Alabama Governor John Patterson reluctantly promised to protect the bus from KKK mobs and snipers on the road between Birmingham and Montgomery. On the morning of May 20, the Freedom Ride resumed, with the bus carrying the riders traveling toward Montgomery at 90 miles an hour, protected by a contingent of the Alabama State Highway Patrol.

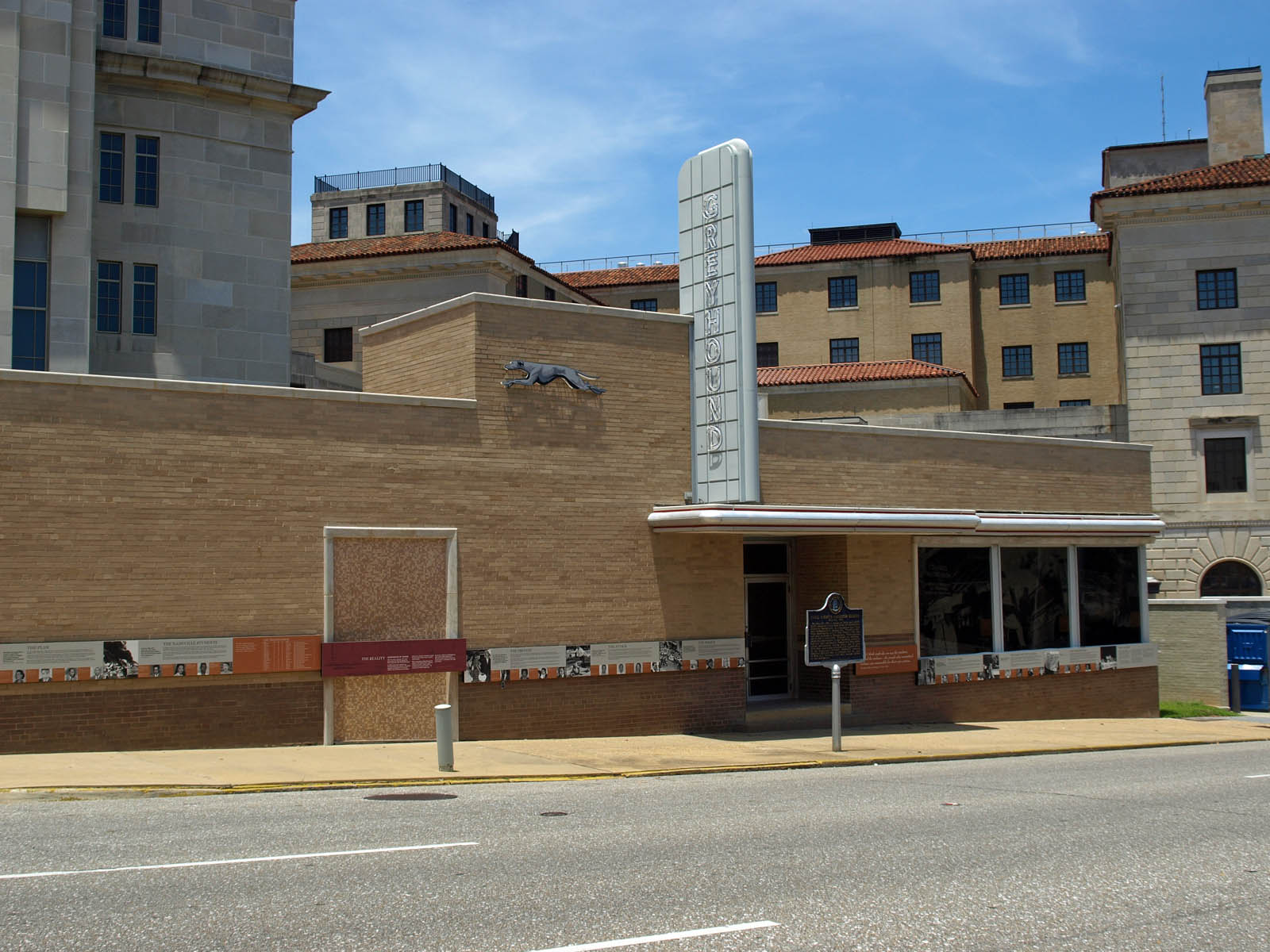
The Old Montgomery Greyhound Station, site of the May 20, 1961 violence, is preserved as the Freedom Rides Museum (2011 photo)

The Highway Patrol abandoned the bus and riders at the Montgomery city limits. At the Montgomery Greyhound station on South Court Street, a white mob awaited. They beat the Freedom Riders with baseball bats and iron pipes. The local police allowed the beatings to go on uninterrupted. Again, white Freedom Riders were singled out for particularly brutal beatings. Reporters and news photographers were attacked first and their cameras destroyed, but one reporter took a photo later of Jim Zwerg in the hospital, showing how he was beaten and bruised. Seigenthaler, a Justice Department official, was beaten and left unconscious lying in the street. Ambulances refused to take the wounded to the hospital. Local black residents rescued them, and a number of the Freedom Riders were hospitalized.

On the following night, Sunday, May 21, more than 1,500 people packed into Reverend Ralph Abernathy's First Baptist Church to honor the Freedom Riders. Among the speakers were Rev. Martin Luther King Jr., who had led the 1955–1956 Montgomery bus boycott, Rev. Fred Shuttlesworth, and James Farmer. Outside, a mob of more than 3,000 white people attacked the black attendees, with a handful of the United States Marshals Service protecting the church from assault and fire bombs. With city and state police making no effort to restore order, the civil rights leaders appealed to the President for protection. President Kennedy threatened to intervene with federal troops if the governor would not protect the people. Governor Patterson forestalled that by finally ordering the Alabama National Guard to disperse the mob, and the Guard reached the church in the early morning.

In a commemorative Op-Ed piece in 2011, Bernard Lafayette remembered the mob breaking windows of the church with rocks and setting off tear gas canisters. He recounted heroic action by King. After learning that black taxi drivers were arming and forming a group to rescue the people inside, he worried that more violence would result. He selected ten volunteers, who promised non-violence, to escort him through the white mob, which parted to let King and his escorts pass as they marched two by two. King went out to the black drivers and asked them to disperse, to prevent more violence. King and his escorts formally made their way back inside the church, unmolested. Lafayette also was interviewed by the BBC in 2011 and told about these events in an episode broadcast on the radio on August 31, 2011, in commemoration of the Freedom Rides. The Alabama National Guard finally arrived in the early morning to disperse the mob and safely escorted all the people from the church.

=== Into Mississippi ===
Freedom Riders Julia Aaron Humbles and Dave Dennis under escort by armed Alabama National Guardsmen aboard an interstate bus from Montgomery, Alabama, to Jackson, Mississippi, on May 24, 1961.

The next day, Monday, May 22, more Freedom Riders arrived in Montgomery to continue the rides through the South and replace the wounded riders still in the hospital. Behind the scenes, the Kennedy administration arranged a deal with the governors of Alabama and Mississippi, where the governors agreed that state police and the National Guard would protect the Riders from mob violence. In return, the federal government would not intervene to stop local police from arresting Freedom Riders for violating segregation ordinances when the buses arrived at the depots.

On Wednesday morning, May 24, Freedom Riders boarded buses for the journey to Jackson, Mississippi. Surrounded by Highway Patrol and the National Guard, the buses arrived in Jackson without incident, but the riders were immediately arrested when they tried to use the white-only facilities at the Tri-State Trailways depot. The third bus arrived at the Jackson Greyhound station early on May 28, and its Freedom Riders were arrested.

In Montgomery, the next round of Freedom Riders, including the Yale University chaplain William Sloane Coffin, Gaylord Brewster Noyce, and southern ministers Shuttlesworth, Abernathy, Wyatt Tee Walker, and others were similarly arrested for violating local segregation ordinances.

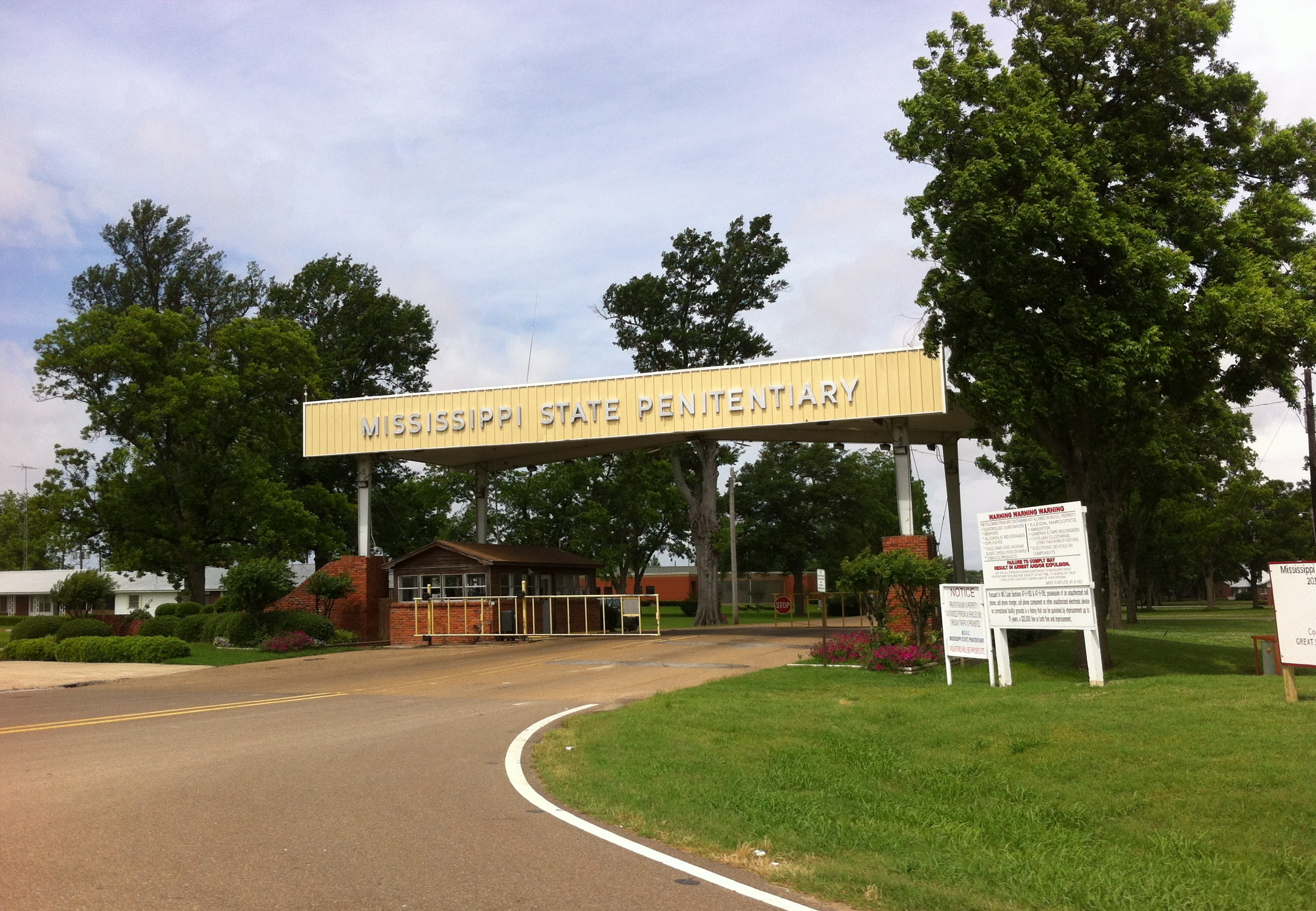
Some Freedom Riders were incarcerated in the Mississippi State Penitentiary

This established a pattern followed by subsequent Freedom Rides, most of which traveled to Jackson, where the Riders were arrested and jailed. Their strategy became one of trying to fill the jails. Once the Jackson and Hinds County jails were filled to overflowing, the state transferred the Freedom Riders to the infamous Mississippi State Penitentiary (known as Parchman Farm). Abusive treatment there included placement of Riders in the Maximum Security Unit (Death Row), issuance of only underwear, no exercise, and no mail privileges. When the Freedom Riders refused to stop singing freedom songs, prison officials took away their mattresses, sheets, and toothbrushes. More Freedom Riders arrived from across the country, and at one time, more than 300 were held in Parchman Farm.

Riders arrested in Jackson included Stokeley Carmichael (19), Catherine Burks (21), Gloria Bouknight (20), Luvahgn Brown (16), Margaret Leonard (19), Helen O'Neal (20), Hank Thomas (20), Carol Silver (22), Hezekiah Watkins (13), Peter Stoner (22), Byron Baer (31), and LeRoy Glenn Wright (19) in addition to many more Nashville Student Movement leader James Lawson, who played a prominent role in coordinating the Freedom Rides, was among the first to be arrested in Jackson.

While in Jackson, Freedom Riders received support from local grassroots civil rights organization Womanpower Unlimited, which raised money and collected toiletries, soap, candy and magazines for the imprisoned protesters. Upon Freedom Riders' release, Womanpower members would provide places for them to bathe while offering them clothes and food. Founded by Clarie Collins Harvey, the group was considered instrumental in the success of the Freedom Riders. Freedom Rider Joan Trumpauer Mulholland said the Womanpower members "were like angels supplying us with just little simple necessities."

=== Kennedy urges "cooling off period" ===
The Kennedys called for a "cooling off period" and condemned the Rides as unpatriotic because they embarrassed the nation on the world stage at the height of the Cold War. James Farmer, head of CORE, responded to Kennedy saying, "We have been cooling off for 350 years, and if we cooled off any more, we'd be in a deep freeze." The Soviet Union criticized the United States for its racism and the attacks on the Riders.

Nonetheless, international outrage about the widely covered events and racial violence created pressure on American political leaders. On May 29, 1961, Attorney General Kennedy sent a petition to the Interstate Commerce Commission (ICC) asking it to comply with the bus-desegregation ruling it had issued in November 1955, in Sarah Keys v. Carolina Coach Company. That ruling had explicitly repudiated the concept of "separate but equal" in the realm of interstate bus travel. Chaired by South Carolina Democrat J. Monroe Johnson, the ICC had failed to implement its own ruling.

=== Summer escalation ===
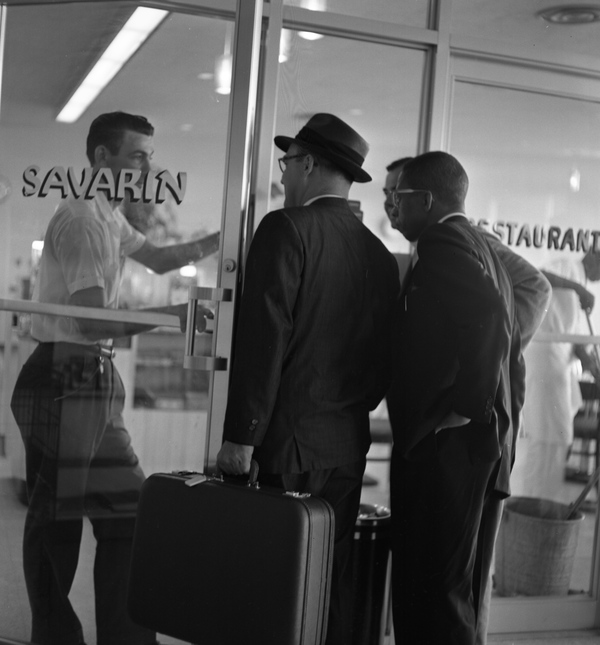
Interracial Freedom Riders Rev. Robert J. Stone (left), Rev. John W. Collier (center), and Rev. Wayne "Chris" Hartmire Jr. (right, facing left) test segregated dining at Tallahassee Municipal Airport on June 15, 1961.

CORE, SNCC, and the SCLC rejected any "cooling off period". They formed a Freedom Riders Coordinating Committee to keep the Rides rolling through June, July, August, and September. During those months, more than 60 different Freedom Rides criss-crossed the South, most of them converging on Jackson, where every Rider was arrested, more than 300 in total. An unknown number were arrested in other Southern towns. It is estimated that almost 450 people participated in one or more Freedom Rides. About 75% were male, and the same percentage were under the age of 30, with about equal participation from black and white citizens.

During the summer of 1961, Freedom Riders also campaigned against other forms of racial discrimination. They sat together in segregated restaurants, lunch counters and hotels. This was especially effective when they targeted large companies, such as hotel chains. Fearing boycotts in the North, the hotels began to desegregate their businesses.

=== Tallahassee ===
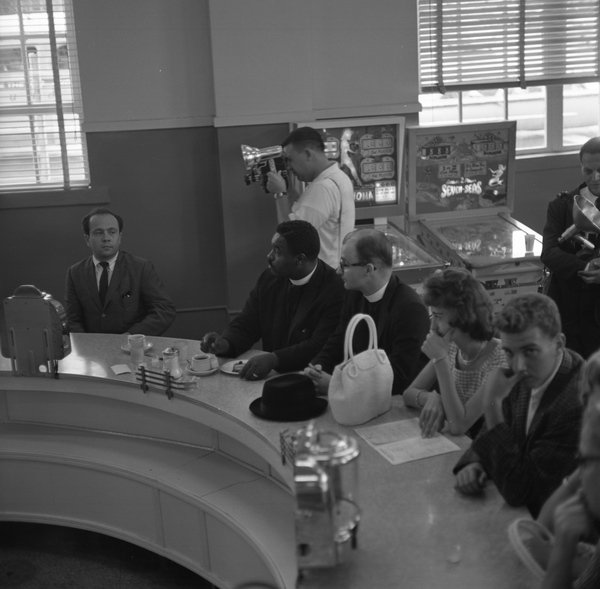
Tallahassee Ten desegregate Greyhound lunch counter 15 June 1961

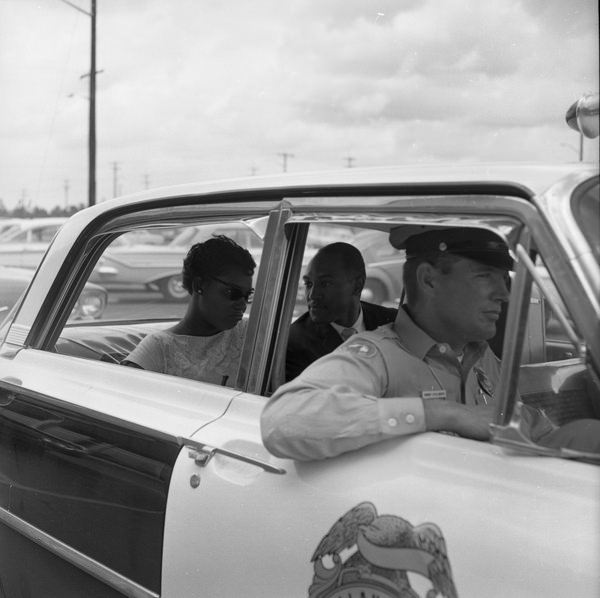
Activists Patricia Stephens and Reverend Petty D. McKinney arrested in Tallahassee, Florida, on June 16, 1961.

In mid-June, a group of Freedom Riders had scheduled to end their ride in Tallahassee, Florida, with plans to fly home from the Tallahassee Municipal Airport. They were provided a police escort to the airport from the city's bus facilities. At the airport, they decided to eat at the Savarin restaurant that was marked "For Whites Only". The owners decided to close rather than serve the mixed group of Freedom Riders. Although the restaurant was privately owned, it was leased from the county government. Canceling their plane reservations, the Riders decided to wait until the restaurant re-opened so they could be served. They waited until 11:00 pm that night and returned the following day. During this time, hostile crowds gathered, threatening violence. On June 16, 1961, the Freedom Riders were arrested in Tallahassee for unlawful assembly. That arrest and subsequent trial became known as Dresner v. City of Tallahassee, named for Rabbi Israel S. Dresner, who was also arrested with the group. The Riders were convicted of unlawful assembly by the Municipal Court of Tallahassee, and the convictions were affirmed in the Florida Circuit Court of the Second Judicial District. The convictions were appealed to the US Supreme Court in 1963, which refused to hear the case based on jurisdictional reasons. In 1964, the Tallahassee 10 protesters returned to the city to serve brief jail sentences.

=== Little Rock (Pulaski County), Arkansas ===
In July 1961, Freedom Riders arrived in Little Rock, Arkansas. The group went to the Trailways bus terminal and entered the 'white' intrastate waiting room . They were arrested by local police for breach of the peace. Although they were convicted and fined, the riders were released after agreeing to leave Arkansas.

=== Monroe, North Carolina, and Robert F. Williams ===
In early August, SNCC staff members James Forman and Paul Brooks, with the support of Ella Baker, began planning a Freedom Ride in solidarity with Robert F. Williams. Williams was an extremely militant and controversial NAACP chapter president for Monroe, North Carolina. After making the public statement that he would "meet violence with violence," (since the federal government would not protect his community from racial attacks) he had been suspended by the NAACP national board over the objections of Williams' local membership. Williams continued his work against segregation however, but now had massive opposition in both black and white communities. He was also facing repeated attempts on his life because of it. Some SNCC staff members sympathized with the idea of armed self-defense, although many on the ride to Monroe saw this as an opportunity to prove the superiority of Gandhian nonviolence over the use of force. Forman was among those who were still supportive of Williams.

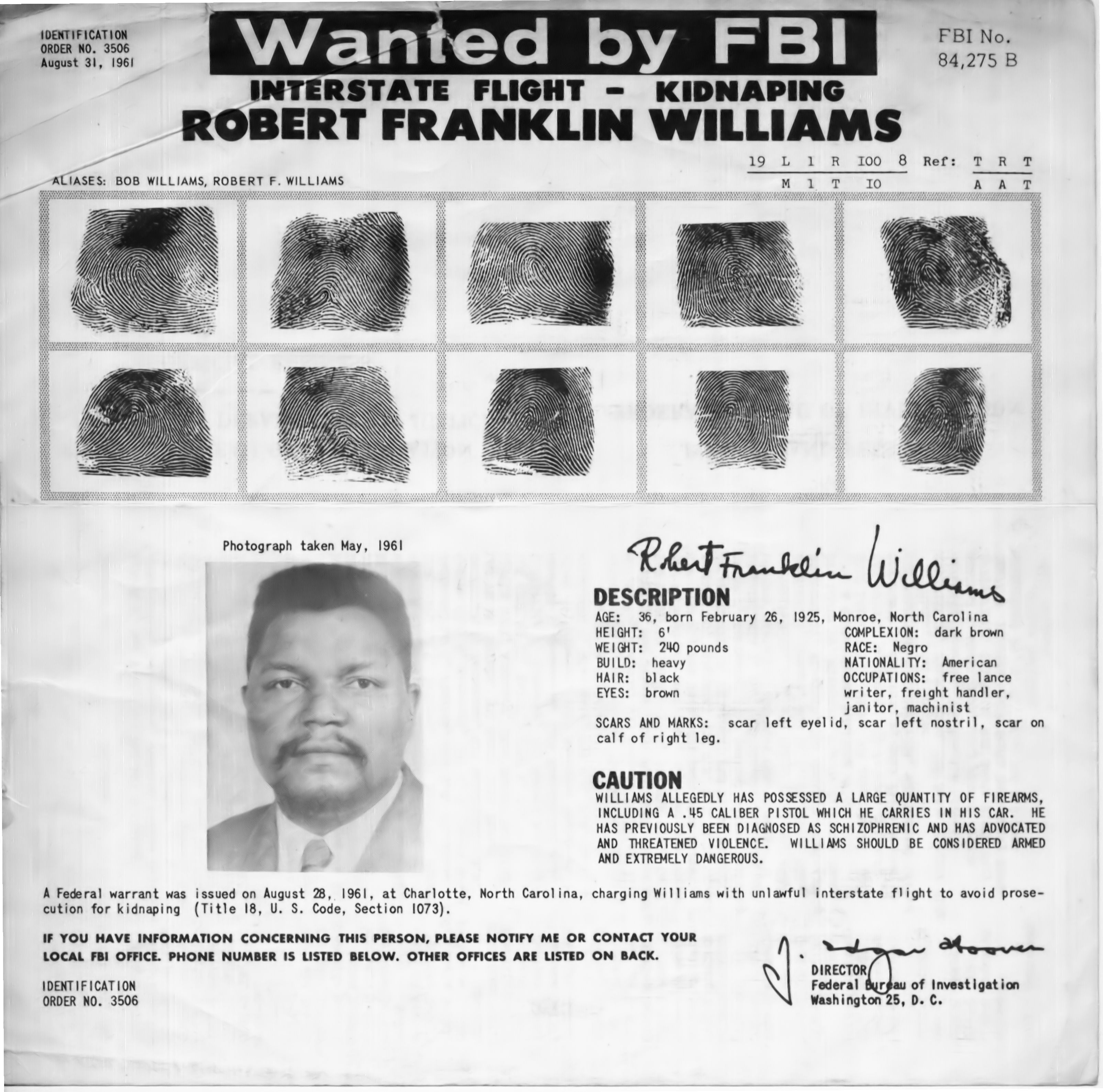
1961 FBI "Wanted" flyer for Robert F. Williams following the August 1961 incidents in Monroe, North Carolina.

The Freedom Riders in Monroe were physically assaulted by white supremacists with the approval of local police. On August 27, James Forman – SNCC's Executive Secretary – was struck unconscious with the butt of a rifle and taken to jail with numerous other demonstrators. Police and white supremacists roamed the town shooting at black civilians, who returned the gunfire. Robert F. Williams fortified the black neighborhood against attack and in the process briefly detained a white couple who had gotten lost there. The police accused Williams of kidnapping and called in the state militia and FBI to arrest him, in spite of the couple being quickly released. To escalate the search, the FBI stepped in and issued a federal warrant for unlawful interstate flight.

Certain he would be lynched, Williams fled and eventually found refuge in Cuba. Movement lawyers, eager to disengage from the situation, successfully urged the Freedom Riders not to practice the normal "jail-no bail" strategy in Monroe. Local officials, also apparently eager to de-escalate, found demonstrators guilty but immediately suspended their sentences. One Freedom Rider however, John Lowry, went on trial for the kidnapping case, along with several associates of Robert F. Williams, including Mae Mallory. Monroe legal defense committees were popular around the country, but ultimately Lowry and Mallory served prison sentences. In 1965, their convictions were vacated due to the exclusion of black citizens from the jury selection.

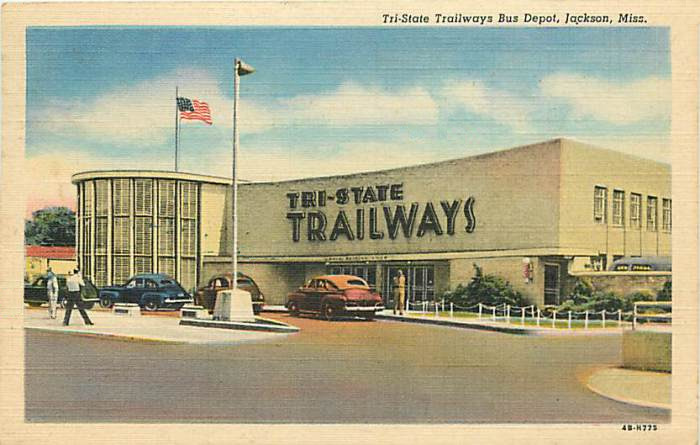
Tri-State Trailways depot, Jackson, Miss. (1940s Postcard)

=== Jackson, Mississippi, and Pierson v. Ray ===
On September 13, 1961, a group of 15 Episcopal priests, including three black priests and twelve white priests, entered the Jackson, Mississippi Trailways bus terminal. Upon entering the coffee shop, they were stopped by two policemen, who asked them to leave. After refusing to leave, all 15 were arrested and jailed for breach of peace, under a now-repealed section of the Mississippi code § 2087.5 that "makes guilty of a misdemeanor anyone who congregates with others in a public place under circumstances such that a breach of the peace may be occasioned thereby, and refuses to move on when ordered to do so by a police officer."

The group included 35-year-old Reverend Robert L Pierson. After the case against the priests was dismissed on May 21, 1962, they sought damages against the police under the Civil Rights Act of 1871. Their claims were ultimately rejected in the United States Supreme Court case Pierson v. Ray (1967), which held that the police were protected by a new court-created legal doctrine, qualified immunity.

=== Resolution and legacy ===
By September it had been more than three months since the filing of the petition by Robert Kennedy. CORE and SNCC leaders made tentative plans for a mass demonstration known as the "Washington Project". This would mobilize hundreds, perhaps thousands, of nonviolent demonstrators to the capital city to apply pressure on the ICC and the Kennedy administration. The idea was pre-empted when the ICC finally issued the necessary orders just before the end of the month. The new policies went into effect on November 1, 1961, six years after the ruling in Sarah Keys v. Carolina Coach Company. After the new ICC rule took effect, passengers were permitted to sit wherever they pleased on interstate buses and trains; "white" and "colored" signs were removed from the terminals; racially-segregated drinking fountains, toilets, and waiting rooms serving interstate customers were consolidated; and the lunch counters began serving all customers, regardless of race.

The widespread violence in response to the Freedom Rides sent shock waves through American society. People were worried that the Rides were evoking widespread social disorder and racial divergence, an opinion supported and strengthened in many communities by the press. The press in white communities condemned the direct action approach that CORE was taking, while some of the national press negatively portrayed the Riders as provoking unrest.

At the same time, the Freedom Rides established great credibility with black and white people throughout the United States and inspired many to engage in direct action for civil rights. Perhaps most significantly, the actions of the Freedom Riders from the North, who faced danger on behalf of southern black citizens, impressed and inspired the many black people living in rural areas throughout the South. They formed the backbone of the wider civil rights movement, engaging in voter registration and other activities. Southern black activists generally organized around their churches, the center of their communities and a base of moral strength.

The Freedom Riders helped inspire participation in subsequent civil rights campaigns, including voter registration throughout the South, freedom schools, and the Black Power movement. At the time, most black Southerners had been unable to register to vote, due to state constitutions, laws and practices that had effectively disfranchised them since the turn of the 20th century. For instance, white administrators supervised reading comprehension and literacy tests that even highly educated black people could not pass.

In Australia, the American Freedom Riders inspired the 1965 Freedom Ride in New South Wales. This event brought attention to the significant social and legal discrimination against Aboriginal Australians in regional, rural and remote areas of New South Wales, including segregation from public facilities and private businesses.

== List of Freedom Rides ==
=== Precursors to Freedom Rides ===
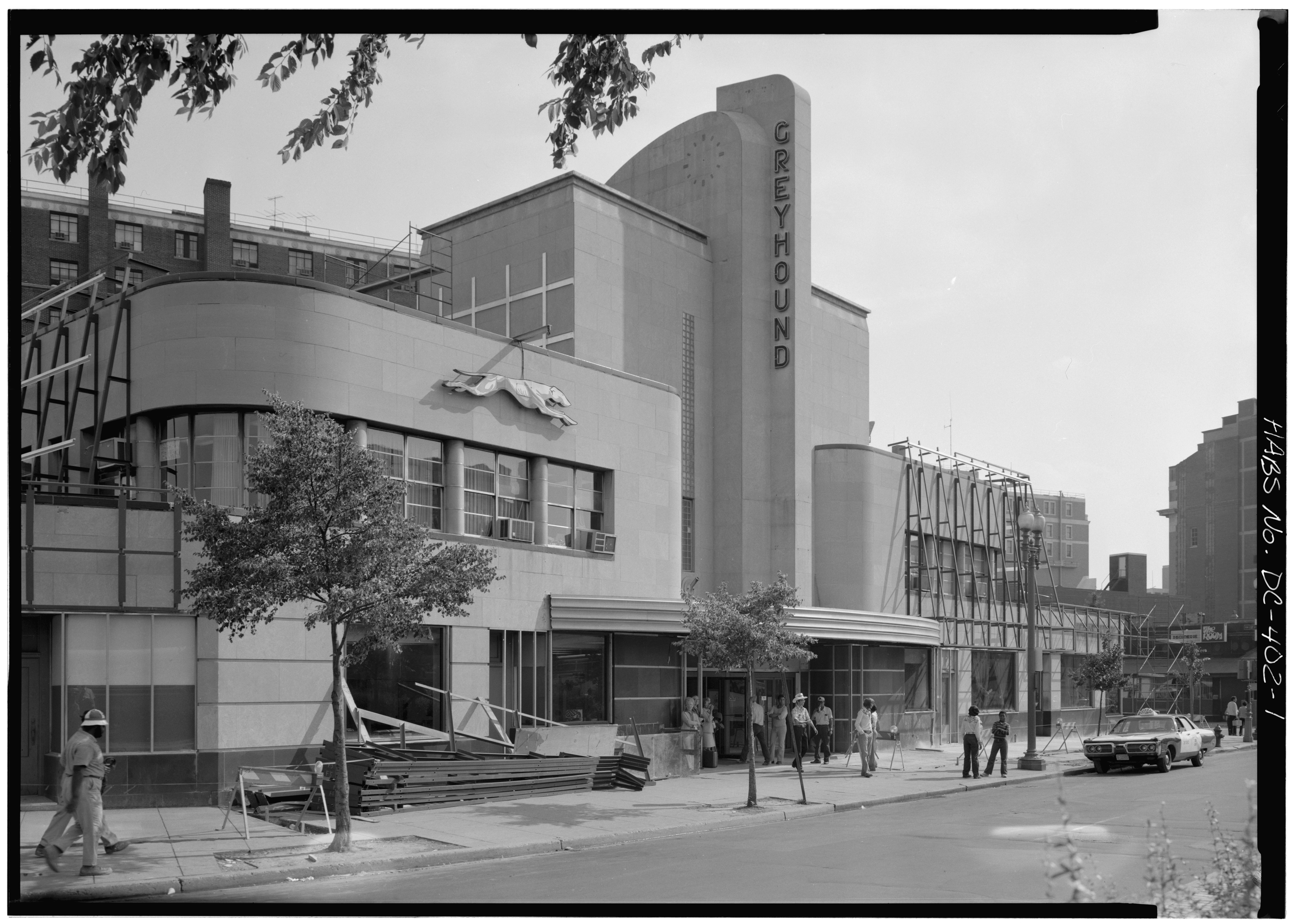
Washington, DC, Greyhound terminal. Northern starting point for several early Freedom Rides

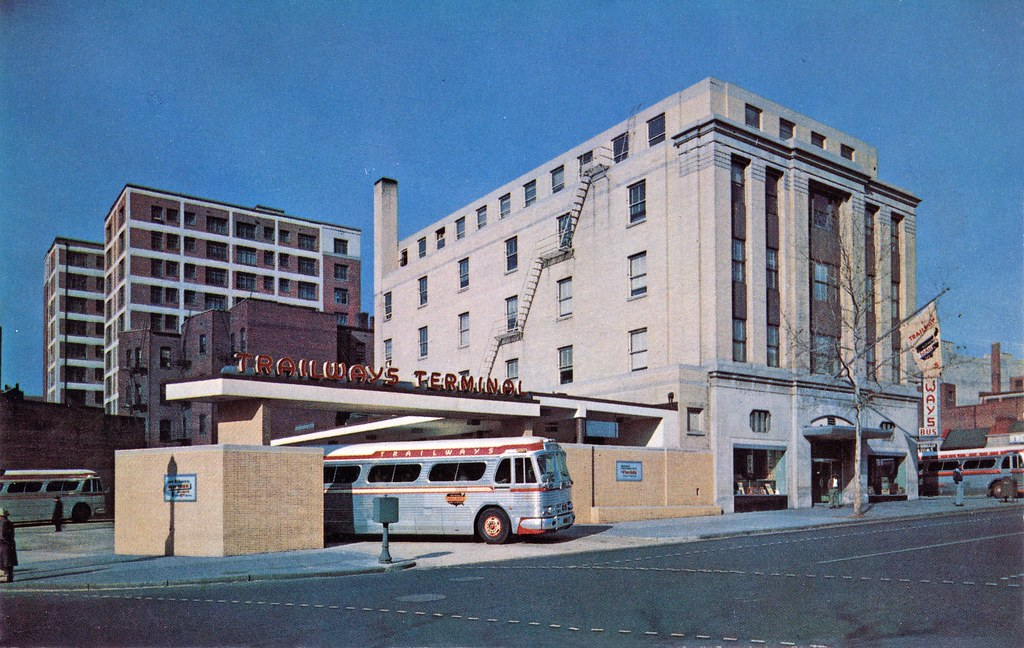
Washington DC Trailways terminal c. 1965 showing a GM PD-4104 "Highway Traveler" bus, such as depicted in Anniston, LA attack on riders

Ride	Date	Carrier	Point of departure	Destination	Ref.	Note
Journey of Reconciliation	April 9–23, 1947	Trailways and Greyhound	Washington, D.C.	Washington, D.C.		(Note: Included 16 participants – Louis Adams, Dennis Banks, Ernest Bromley, Joseph Felmet, George Houser, Homer A. Jack, Andrew S. Johnson, Conrad Lynn, Wally Nelson, James Peck, Worth Randle, Igal Roodenko, Bayard Rustin, Eugene Stanley, William Worthy and Nathan Wright.)
Little Freedom Ride	April 22, 1961		East St. Louis, Illinois	Sikeston, Missouri		(Note: Included 18 participants – Frances Bergman, Walter Bergman, Albert Bigelow, Ed Blankenheim, Benjamin Elton Cox, James Farmer, Robert G. (Gus) Griffin, Herman K. Harris, Genevieve Hughes, John Lewis, Jimmy McDonald, Ivor (Jerry) Moore, Mae Frances Moultrie, James Peck, Joseph Perkins, Charles Person, Isaac (Ike) Reynolds and Hank Thomas.)

=== Original and subsequent Freedom Rides ===
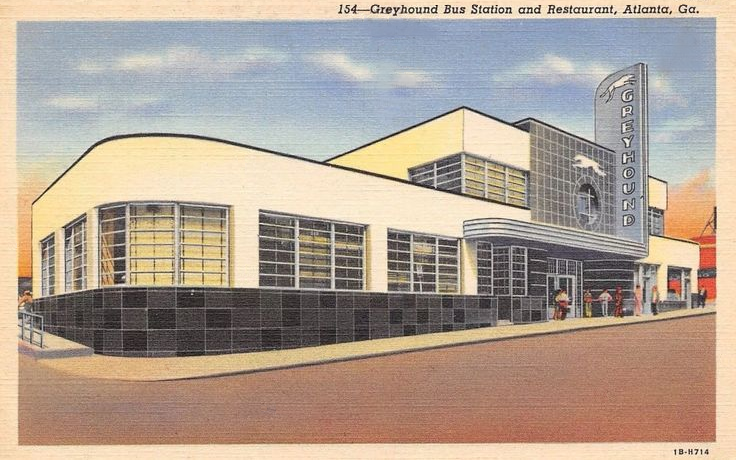
Atlanta, GA, Greyhound Bus Station and Restaurant, c. 1940

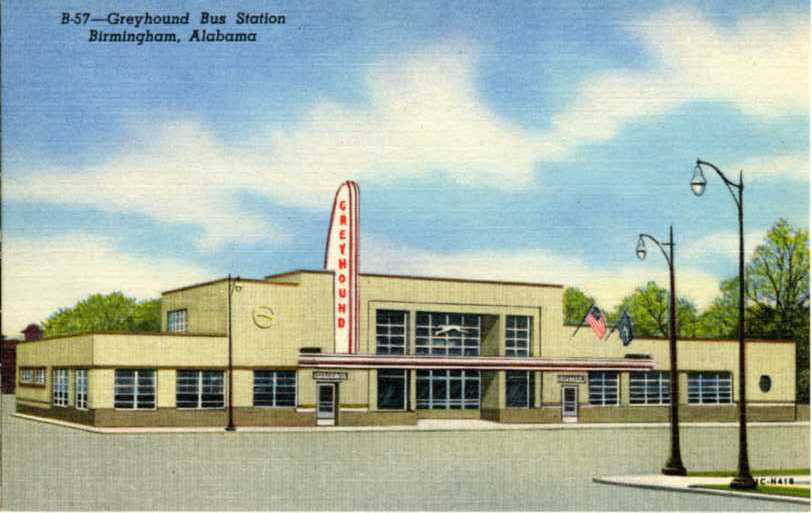
Birmingham, AL, Greyhound Bus Station, c. 1950

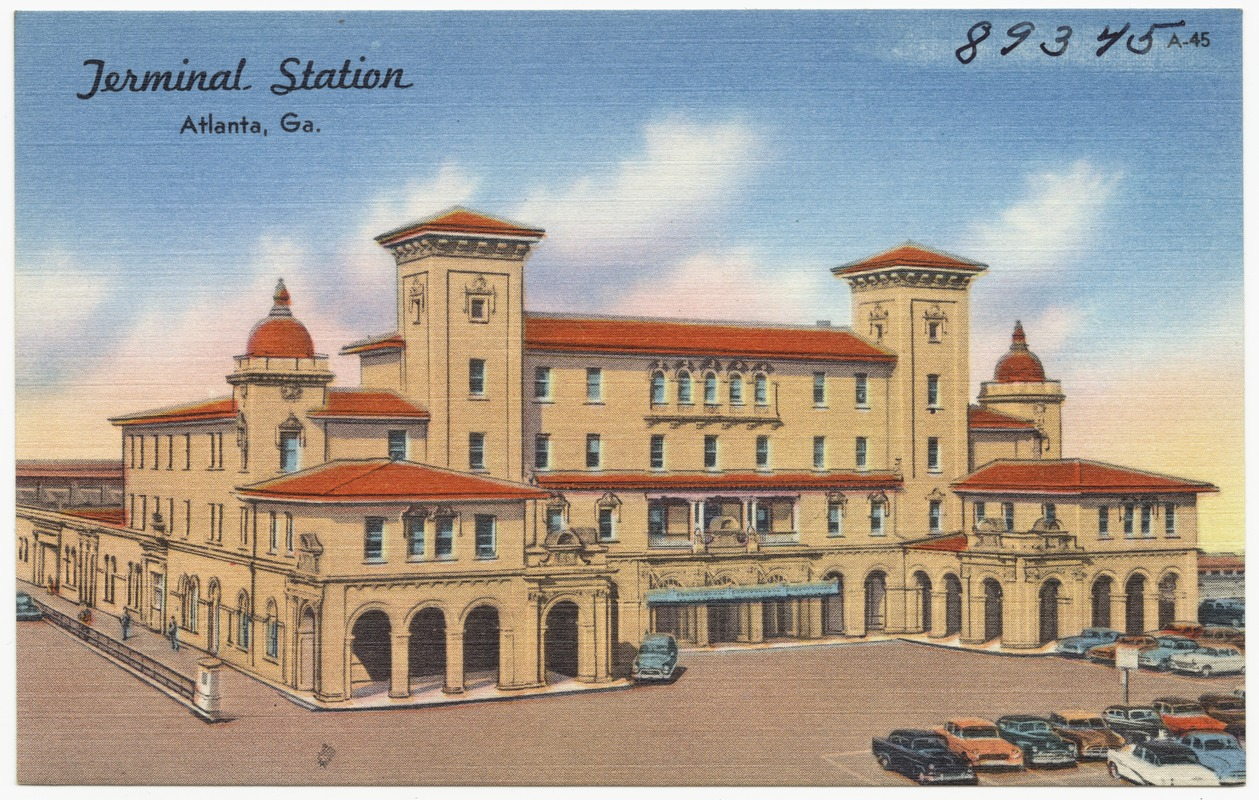
Atlanta's Terminal Station, origin of a Freedom Ride on the Central of Georgia Railway. (postcard view, c. 1949)

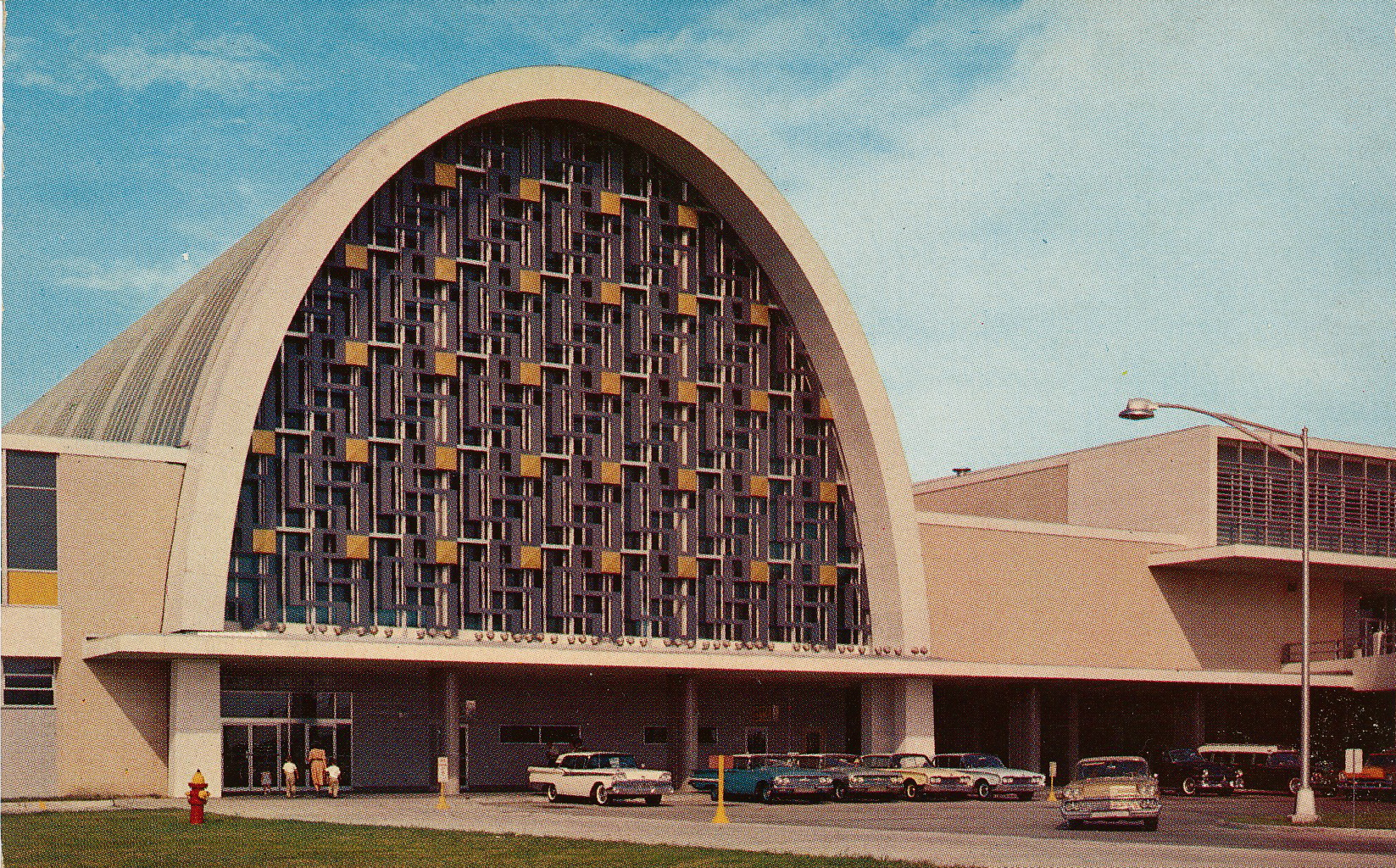
New Orleans (Moisant) airport, alternate terminus for the May 1961 CORE freedom ride.

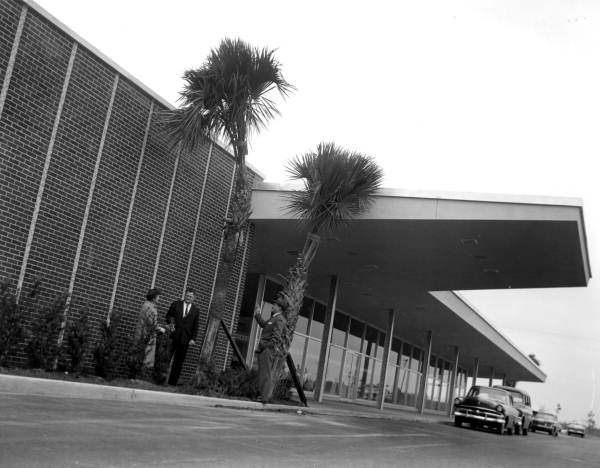
Tallahassee Municipal Airport March 1961.

Denotes location a Freedom Rider tested the compliance of the Boynton v. Virginia (1960) decision at a terminal facility only

Ride	Date	Carrier or terminal	Point of departure	Destination	Ref.	Note
Original CORE Freedom Ride	May 4–17, 1961	Trailways	Washington, D.C.	New Orleans, Louisiana		
Original CORE Freedom Ride	May 4–17, 1961	Greyhound	Washington, D.C.	New Orleans, Louisiana		
Nashville Student Movement Freedom Ride	May 17–21, 1961		Birmingham, Alabama	New Orleans, Louisiana		(Note: Included 23 participants – William Barbee, James Bevel, Paul Brooks, Catherine Burks-Brooks, Carl Bush, Charles Butler, Joseph Carter, Allen Cason Jr., Lucretia Collins, Rudolph Graham, William E. Harbour, Susan Hermann, Patricia Jenkins, Bernard Lafayette, Frederick Leonard, John Lewis, Salynn McCollum, William B. Mitchell Jr., Etta Simpson, Ruby Doris Smith-Robinson, Susan Wilbur, Clarence M. Wright and James Zwerg.)
Connecticut Freedom Ride	May 24–25, 1961	Greyhound	Atlanta, Georgia	Montgomery, Alabama		(Note: Included 7 participants – Clyde Carter, William Sloane Coffin, Joseph Charles Jones, John Maguire, Gaylord Noyce, George B. Smith and David E. Swift.)
Interfaith Freedom Ride	June 13–16, 1961	Greyhound	Washington, D.C.	Tallahassee, Florida		(Note: Included 18 participants – C. Donald Alstork, Robert McAfee Brown, John Collier, Israel S. Dresner, Malcolm Evans, Martin Freedman, Arthur L. Hardge, Wayne "Chris" Clyde Hartmire Jr., George Leake, Allan Levine, Petty McKinney, Walter Plaut, Henry Proctor, Ralph Lord Roy, Perry A. Smith III, Robert J. Stone, A. McRaven (Mack) Warner and Edward White.)
Organized Labor–Professional Freedom Ride	June 13–16, 1961		Washington, D.C.	St. Petersburg, Florida		(Note: Included 14 participants – Jerald Bobrow, Herbert Callender, Ralph Diamond, Joyce Lebowitz, Sheree Massaquoi, Edward Morton, Gordon Negen, James O'Connor, Francis Randall, Laura Randall, Leslie Smith, Daniel N. Stern, Dupree White and Benny Winston.)
Missouri to Louisiana CORE Freedom Ride	July 8–15, 1961		St. Louis, Missouri	New Orleans, Louisiana		(Note: Included 5 participants – Benjamin Elton Cox, Annie Lumpkin, Bliss Anne Malone, John Curtis Raines and Janet Reinitz.)
New Jersey to Arkansas CORE Freedom Ride	July 13–24, 1961		Newark, New Jersey	Little Rock, Arkansas		(Note: Included 5 participants – John C. Harvard, Sidney Shanken, Woollcott Smith, Herman (Chaim) S. Stern and Hank Thomas.)
Los Angeles to Houston Freedom Ride	August 9–11, 1961	Santa Fe Railroad or Southern Pacific Railroad	Los Angeles Union Station	Houston Union Station Coffee Shop		(Note: Eleven riders departed Los Angeles Union Station via train. Upon arriving in Houston, they found the Santa Fe station facilities closed, prompting them to transfer to the Union Station Coffee Shop, where they were arrested testing integration compliance. Included 18 total participants across the campaign timeline – Charles Berrard, Marjorie Dunson, Robert Farrell, Herbert Hamilton, Willie Handy, Holly Hogrobrooks, John Hutchins, Eddie Jones, Robert E. Jones, Robert Paul Kaufman, Ellen Kleinman, Pat Kovner, Ronald La Bostrie, Steven McNichols, Marian Moody, Beverly Radcliffe, Steven Sanfield and Joseph McClendon Stevenson.)
Monroe Freedom Ride	August 17–September 1, 1961			Monroe, North Carolina		(Note: Included 19 participants – Robert M. Baum, Edward J. Bromberg, Paul Brooks, Charles Butler, Price Chatham, Paul David Dietrich, James Forman, Richard P. Griswold, Larry Fred Hunter, Edward W. Kale, Frederick Leonard, John Lowry, William Carl Mahoney, Joseph John Michael McDonald, David Kerr Morton, Heath Cliff Rush, Kenneth Martin Shilman, Daniel Ray Thompson and LeRoy Glenn Wright.)
Prayer Pilgrimage Freedom Ride	September 13, 1961	Trailways	New Orleans, Louisiana	Jackson, Mississippi		(Note: Included 15 participants – Gilbert S. Avery III, Myron B. Bloy Jr., James Pleasant Breeden, John Crocker Jr., James Walker Evans, John Marvin Evans, Quinland Reeves Gordon, James Garrard Jones, John Burnett Morris, Robert Laughlin Pierson, Geoffrey Sedgewick Simpson, Robert Page Taylor, William Adrew Wendt, Vernon P. Woodward and Merrill Orne Young.)
Albany Freedom Rides	November 1, 1961	Trailways (terminal only)	Atlanta, Georgia			(Note: Included 4 participants – James Bevel, James Forman, Joseph Charles Jones and Bernard Lafayette)
Albany Freedom Rides	November 1, 1961	Trailways	Atlanta, Georgia	Albany, Georgia		(Note: Included 3 participants – Salynn McCollum, Cordell Reagon and Charles Sherrod.)
Albany Freedom Rides	November 22, 1961	Trailways (terminal only)	Albany, Georgia			(Note: Included 5 participants – Julian Carswell, Bertha Gober, Blanton Hall, Evelyn Toney and Eddie Wilson.)
Albany Freedom Rides	December 10, 1961	Central of Georgia Railway	Atlanta Terminal Station	Albany, Georgia (Union Station)		(Note: Included 9 participants – Joan Browning, Norma F. Collins, James Forman, Sandra Cason "Casey" Hayden, Tom Hayden, Per Laursen, Bernard Lee, Lenora Taitt and Robert Zellner.)
McComb Freedom Rides	November 29, 1961	Greyhound	New Orleans, Louisiana	McComb, Mississippi		(Note: Included 5 participants – George Raymond Jr., Doratha Smith, Jerome H. Smith, Alice Thompson and Thomas Valentine.)
McComb Freedom Rides	December 1, 1961	Greyhound	Baton Rouge, Louisiana	McComb, Mississippi		(Note: Included 6 participants – Willie Bradford, Thomas Peete, George Raymond Jr., Claude Reese, Patricia Tate and Jean Thompson.)
McComb Freedom Rides	December 2, 1961	Greyhound	Jackson, Mississippi	McComb, Mississippi		(Note: Included 5 participants – James Burnham, Jerome Byrd, MacArthur Cotton, Thomas Gaither and Joe Lewis.)

=== Mississippi Freedom Rides ===
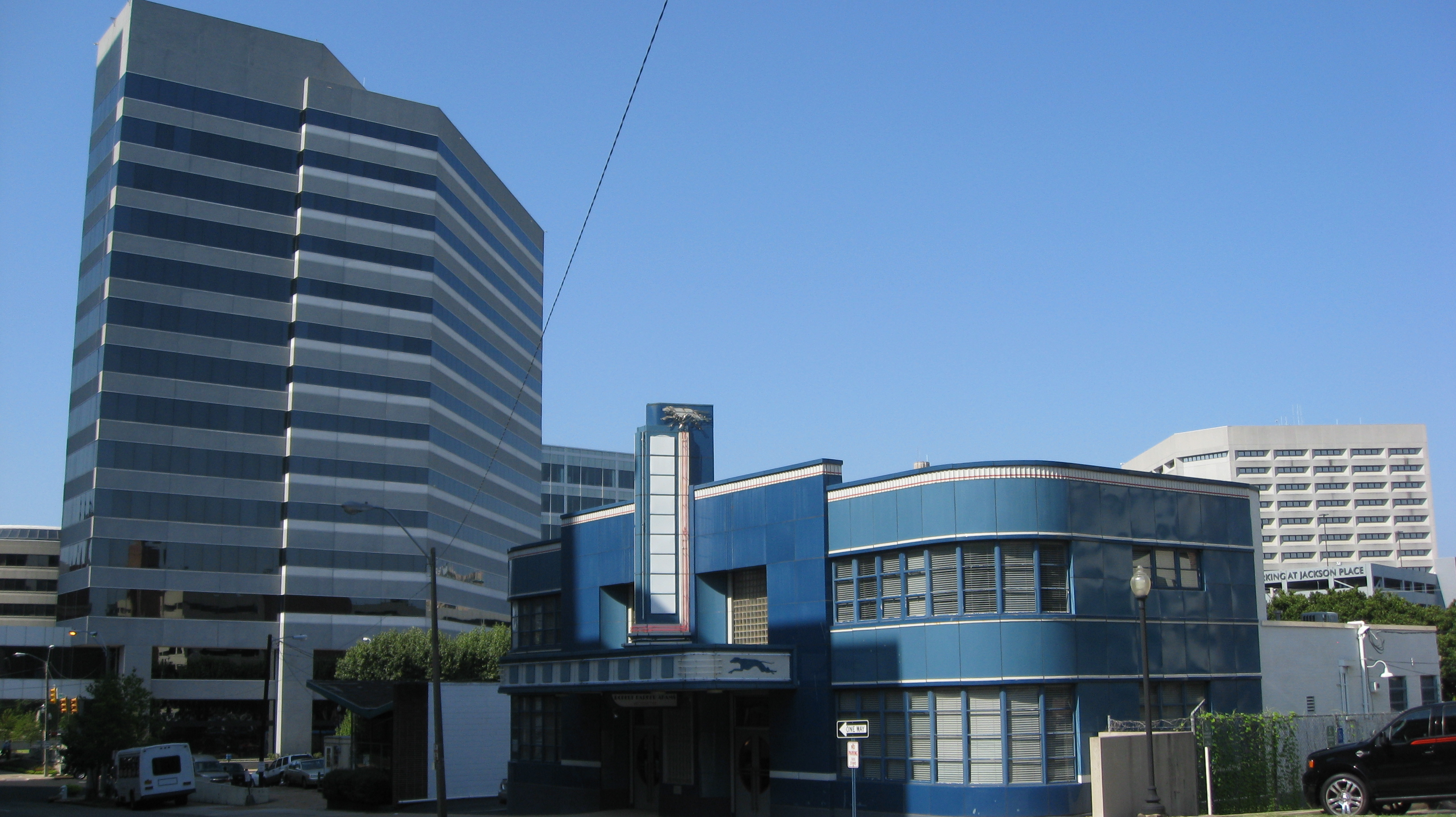
Preserved Greyhound Station, Jackson, Mississippi

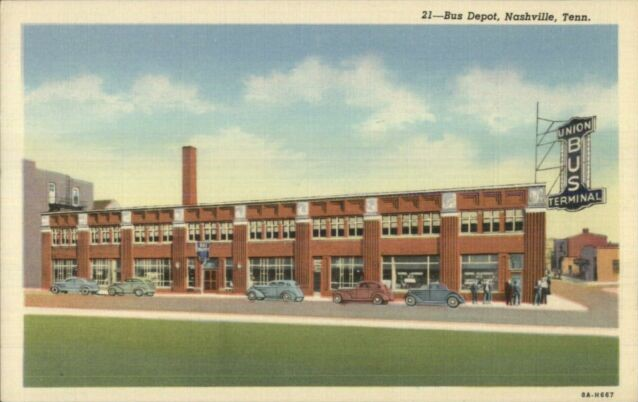
Bus Depot, Nashville, Tennessee c. 1940

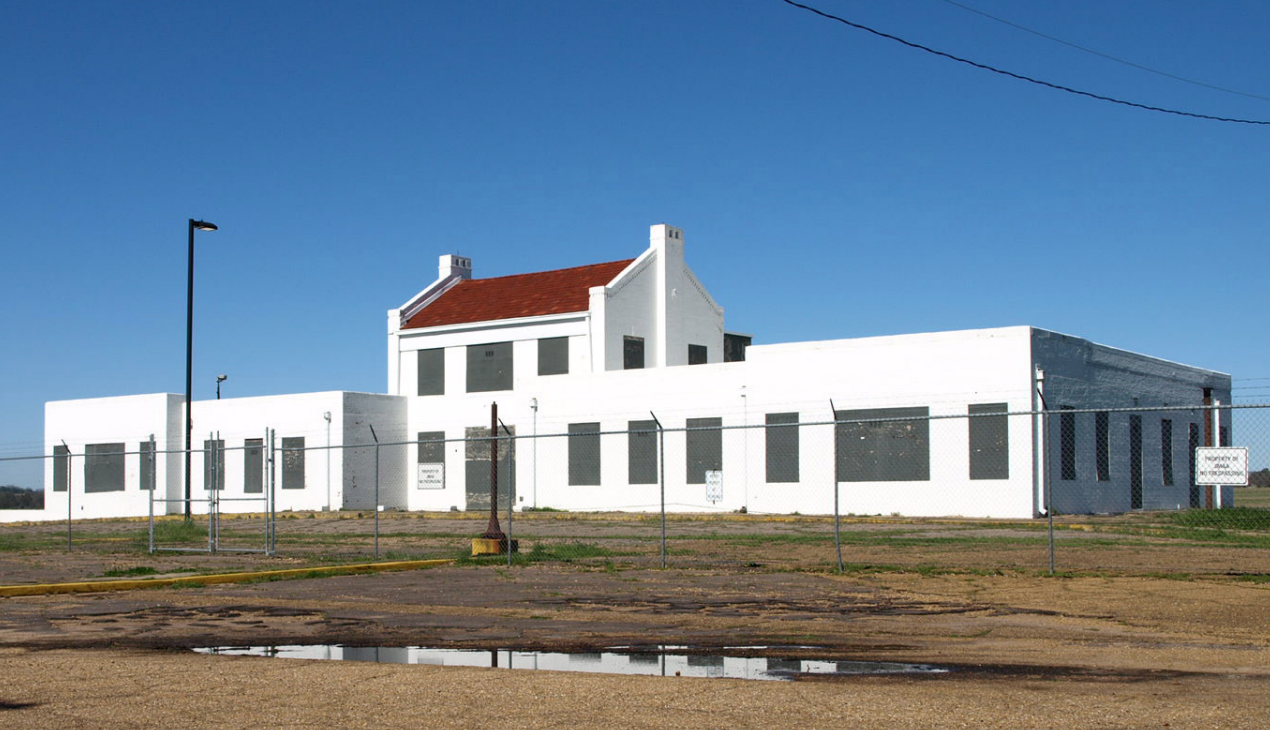
The Hawkins Field terminal building in Jackson, Miss., where several Freedom Riders arrived and were arrested.(2020 photo)

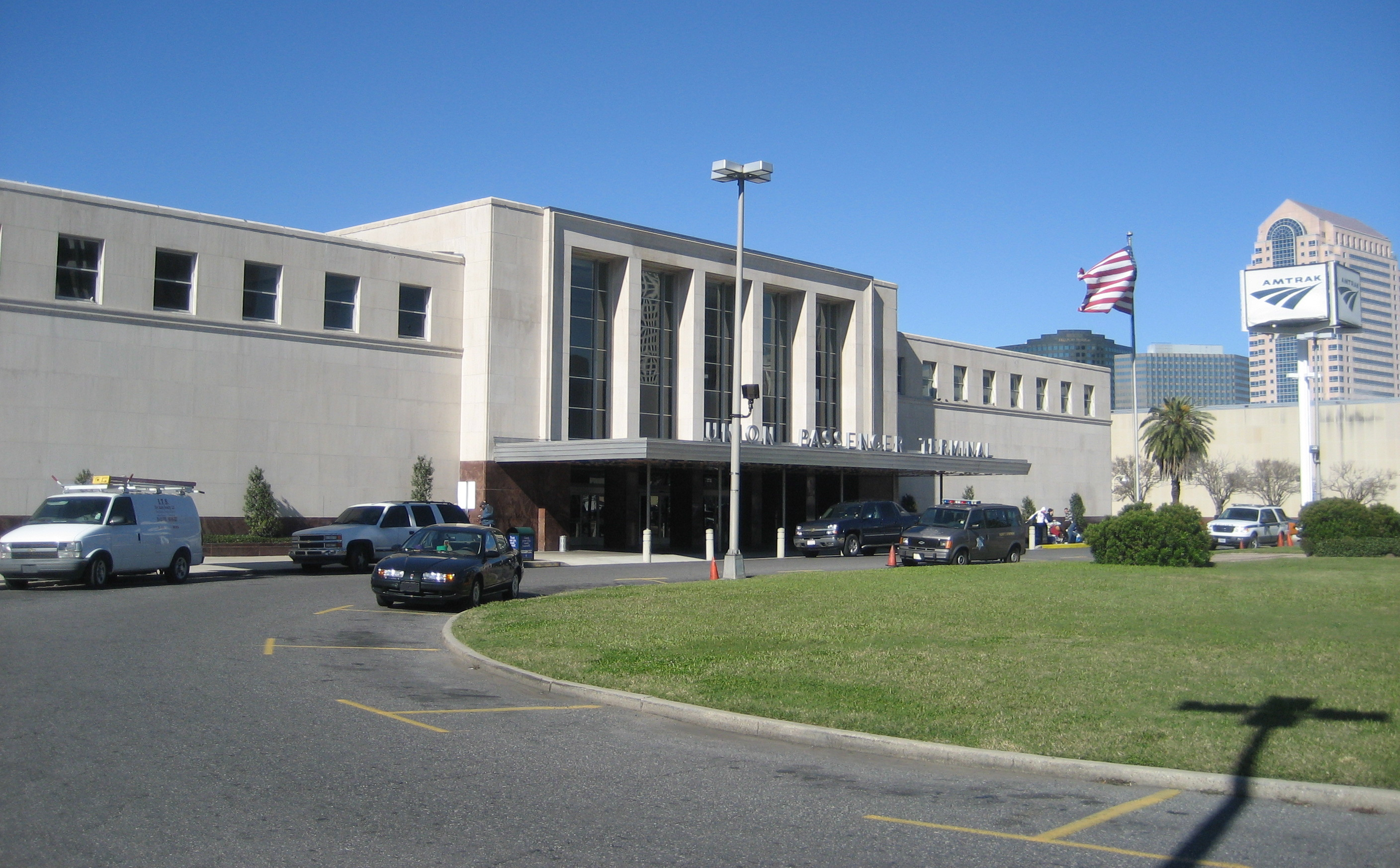
New Orleans Union Passenger Terminal

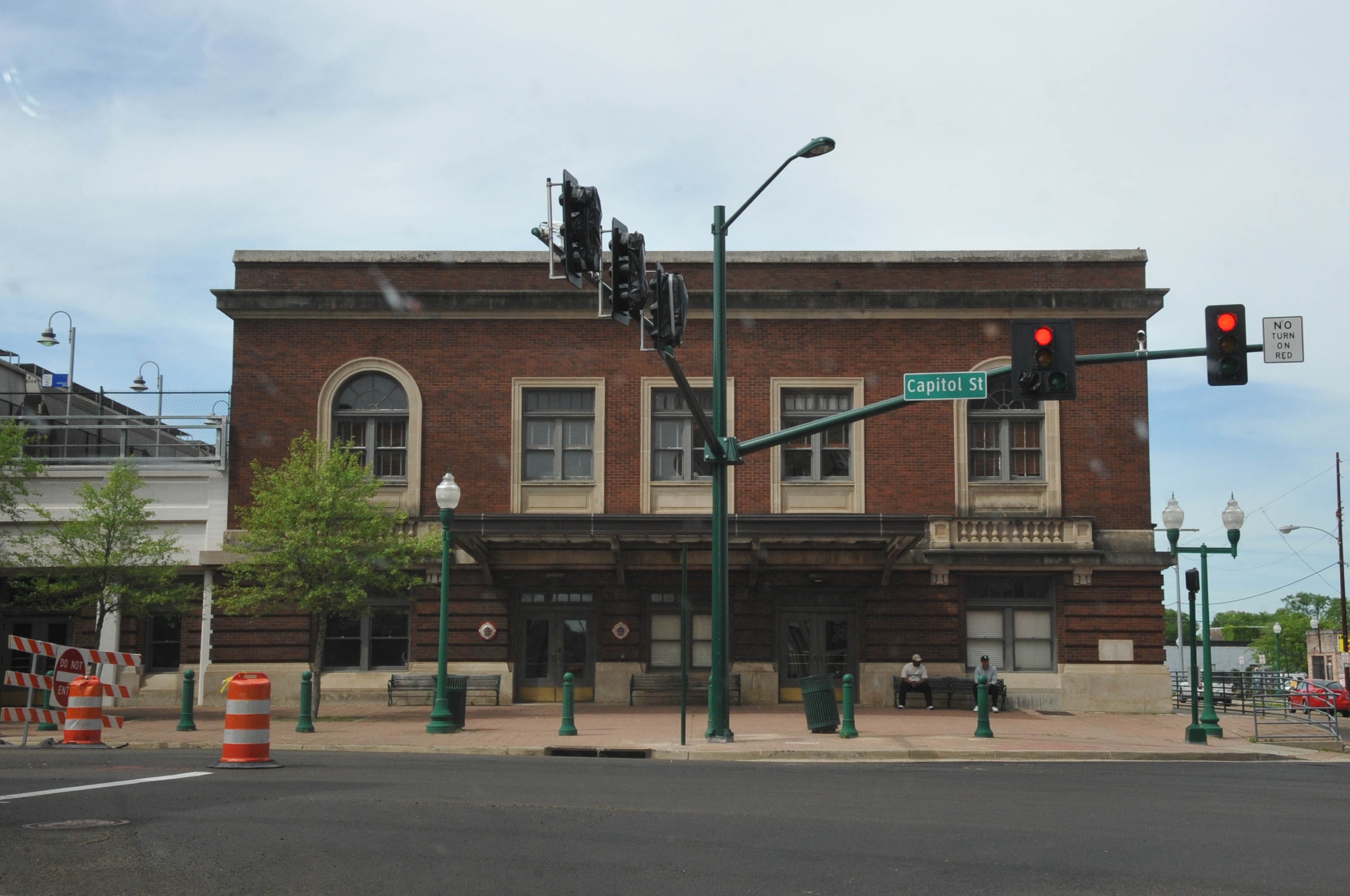
Union Station (Jackson, Mississippi)

Denotes location a Freedom Rider tested the compliance of the Boynton v. Virginia (1960) decision at a terminal facility only

Date	Carrier or terminal	Point of departure	Destination	Ref.	Note
May 24, 1961	Trailways	Montgomery, Alabama	Jackson, Mississippi		(Note: Included 12 participants – Julia Aaron, Alexander M. Anderson, Harold Andrews, James Bevel, Joseph Carter, Dave Dennis, Paul David Dietrich, Bernard Lafayette, James Lawson, Jean Catherine Thompson, C. T. Vivian, Matthew Walker Jr.)
May 24, 1961	Greyhound	Montgomery, Alabama	Jackson, Mississippi		(Note: Included 15 participants – Peter M. Ackerberg, Doris Castle, Lucretia R. Collins, John Lee Copeland, Dion Tyrone Diamond, Grady H. Donald, James Farmer, Frank George Holloway, John Lewis, John H. Moody Jr., Ernest (Rip) Patton Jr., Jerome H. Smith, Clarence Lloyd Thomas, Hank Thomas and LeRoy Glenn Wright.)
May 28, 1961	Greyhound	Nashville, Tennessee	Jackson, Mississippi		(Note: Included 9 participants – Catherine Burks-Brooks, William E. Harbour, Frederick Leonard, Lester G. McKinnie, William B. Mitchell Jr., Etta Simpson, Mary J. Smith, Frances L. Wilson and Clarence M. Wright.)
May 28, 1961	Trailways	Nashville, Tennessee	Jackson, Mississippi		(Note: Included 8 participants – Allen Cason Jr., Albert Lee Dunn, David B. Fankhauser, Franklin W. Hunt, Larry Fred Hunter, Pauline Edythe Knight, William Carl Mahoney and Charles David Myers.)
May 30, 1961	Illinois Central Railroad	New Orleans, Louisiana	Jackson, Mississippi		(Note: Included 8 participants – James Keet Davis Jr., Glenda Jean Gaither, Paul S. Green, Joe Henry Griffith, Charles Haynie, Robert Lawrence Heller, Sandra Marie Nixon and Peter Sterling.)
June 2, 1961	Trailways (#1)	Montgomery, Alabama	Jackson, Mississippi		(Note: Included 6 participants – Charles Butler, Price Chatham, Joseph John Michael McDonald, Meryle Joy Reagon, Kenneth Martin Shilman and Ruby Doris Smith-Robinson.)
June 2, 1961	Trailways (#2)	Montgomery, Alabama	Jackson, Mississippi		(Note: Included 8 participants – Ralph Fertig, Richard LeRoy Gleason, Jesse J. Harris, Cordell Reagon, Carolyn Yvonne Reed, Felix Jacques Singer, Leslie Word and Elizabeth Porter Wyckoff.)
June 6, 1961	Trailways	New Orleans, Louisiana	Jackson, Mississippi		(Note: Included 7 participants – Johnny Frank Ashford, Abraham Bassfordt, James Thomas McDonough, Terry John Sullivan, Shirley Thompson, James Robert Wahlstrom and Ernest Newell Weber.)
June 7, 1961	Trailways	Nashville, Tennessee	Jackson, Mississippi		(Note: Included 6 participants – John Gager, Reginald Malcolm Green, Edward W. Kale, Raymond B. Randolph Jr., Carol Ruth Silver and Obadiah Lee Simms.)
June 7, 1961	Greyhound Bus Station (terminal only)	Jackson, Mississippi			(Note: Included 1 participant – Michael Audain.)
June 7, 1961	Hawkins Field (airport)	St. Louis, Missouri	Jackson, Mississippi		(Note: Included 3 participants – Gwendolyn C. Jenkins, Robert L. Jenkins and Ralph Edward Washington.)
June 8, 1961	Illinois Central Railroad	New Orleans, Louisiana	Jackson, Mississippi		(Note: Included 9 participants – Travis O. Britt, Stokely Carmichael, Gwendolyn T. Greene, Teri Susan Perlman, Jane Ellen Rosett, Jan Leighton Triggs, Joan Harris Trumpauer, Robert Wesby and Helene Dorothy Wilson.)
June 8, 1961	Hawkins Field (airport)	Montgomery, Alabama	Jackson, Mississippi		(Note: Included 2 participants – Mark Lane and Percy Sutton.)
June 9, 1961	Illinois Central Railroad	Nashville Union Station	Jackson Illinois Central Terminal		(Note: Included 5 participants – Margaret Winonah Beamer, Edward J. Bromberg, Patricia Elaine Bryant, Del Greenblatt and Heath Cliff Rush.)
June 10, 1961	Greyhound	Nashville, Tennessee	Jackson, Mississippi		(Note: Included 6 participants – Leora Berman, Stephen John Green, Richard P. Giswold, Leon Daniel Horne, Katherine Pleune and Lowell A. Woods Jr.)
June 11, 1961	Greyhound	Nashville, Tennessee	Jackson, Mississippi		(Note: Included 7 participants – Zev Aelony, Robert M. Baum, Marvin Allen Davidov, David Kerr Morton, Claire O'Connor, Daniel Ray Thompson and Eugine John Uphoff.)
June 16, 1961	Greyhound	Nashville, Tennessee	Jackson, Mississippi		(Note: Included 5 participants – Elizabeth S. Adler, Bob Filner, Elizabeth Slade Hirschfeld, Karen Elizabeth Kytle and Leon N. Rice.)
June 19, 1961	Greyhound Bus Station (terminal only)	Jackson, Mississippi			(Note: Included 1 participant – Eugene Levine.)
June 20, 1961	Illinois Central Railroad	New Orleans, Louisiana	Jackson, Mississippi		(Note: Included 13 participants – Rita J. Carter, Margaret Ann Kerr, Robert Martinson, Paul Duncan McConnell, Frederick Dean Muntean, Grant Harland Muse Jr., Lestra Alene Peterson, Joan Pleune, Joseph Marion Pratt, Jorgia B. Yvonne Siegel, Buren Lewis Teale, Lawrence Triss Jr. and Thomas Van Roland.)
June 21, 1961	Trailways	Montgomery, Alabama	Jackson, Mississippi		(Note: Included 9 participants – Miriam (Mimi) Feingold, Judith Ann Frieze, Margaret Burr Leonard, Samuel Timothy Nash, Henry Schwarzschild, Leon Felton Smith Jr., Theresa Edwards Walker, Wyatt Tee Walker and Melvin Lorenzo White.)
June 23, 1961	Tri-State Trailways station (terminal only)	Jackson, Mississippi			(Note: Included 4 participants – Thomas Madison Armstrong III, Mary Magdalene Harrison, Elnora R. Price and Joseph Lee Ross.)
June 25, 1961	Illinois Central Railroad	New Orleans, Louisiana	Jackson, Mississippi		(Note: Included 20 participants – George Marion Blevins, Gloria Leevare-Dee Bouknight, Arthur Brooks Jr., John Luther Dolan, Mary Lucille Hamilton, Gordon Lau Harris, Louise Jean Inghram, Frank Johnson, Marian Alice Kendall, Norma Libson, Claude Albert Liggins, Eddora Mae Manning, Robert William Mason, Fank Arthur Nelson, Janice Louise Rogers, John Copeland Rogers, Marica Arlene Rosenbaum, Wayne Leslie Taylor, Richard Thorne and Claire Drew Toombs.)
July 2, 1961	Trailways	Montgomery, Alabama	Jackson, Mississippi		(Note: Included 5 participants – Barbara Jane Kay, Robert Allen Miller, Michael Leon Pritchard, Peter Harry Stoner and Leotis Thornton.)
July 5, 1961	Tri-State Trailways station (terminal only)	Jackson, Mississippi			(Note: Included 9 participants – Robert Earl Bass, Ralph Floyd, Eugene Lee, Marshall Bennett, Miller G. Green Jr., Robert Lee Green, Jesse L. Harris, Percy Lee Johnson and James Wilson Jones.)
July 6, 1961	Jackson Union Station (terminal only)	Jackson, Mississippi			(Note: Included 6 participants – Frank Caston, Frankie Lee Griffin, Alpha Zara Palmer, West Davis Phillips, Tommie Watts Jr. and Mack Charles Wells.)
July 6, 1961	Greyhound Bus Station (terminal only)	Jackson, Mississippi			(Note: Included 6 participants – Alfonzo Denson Jr., Samuel Givens, Landy McNair Jr., Earl Vance Jr., Hezekiah Watkins and Paul Edward Young.)
July 7, 1961	Jackson Union Station (terminal only)	Jackson, Mississippi			(Note: Included 1 participant – Morton Bruce Slater.)
July 7, 1961	Trailways	Montgomery, Alabama	Jackson, Mississippi		(Note: Included 8 participants – Charles Biggers, Elmer L. Brown, William Walter Hansen Jr., John Lowry, Norma Matzkin, Isaac (Ike) Reynolds Jr., Daniel Stevens and Willie James Thomas.)
July 9, 1961	Trailways	Montgomery, AL	Jackson, MS (Trailways Terminal)		(Note: Included 8 participants – Daniel E. Bukholder, Lionel Goldbart, Albert Forrest Gordon, Stephen Greenstein, Jeanne H. Herrick, Saul Bernard Manfield, Ralph Robert Rogers and Lula Mae White.)
July 9, 1961	Illinois Central Railroad	New Orleans Union Passenger Terminal	Jackson Illinois Central Terminal		(Note: Included 9 participants – Patricia Dale Baskerville, Larry Bell, Tommie Eldridge Brashear, Edmond Dalbert Jr., Reginald Jackson, Edward B. Johnson, Philip Jonathan Perkins, Roena Rand and John Charles Taylor Jr.)
July 9, 1961	Tri-State Trailways station (terminal only)	Jackson, MS (Blair Methodist Church to Terminal)			(Note: Included 11 participants – Leo Vone Blue, Mildred Juanita Blue, Fred Douglas Clark, Jessie James Davis, Gainnel Hayes, Andrew Horne Jr., Erma Lee Horne, Delores Williams Lynch, Henry Rosell, Oneal Vance and Joe Watts Jr.)
July 15, 1961	Greyhound	New Orleans, Louisiana	Jackson, Mississippi		(Note: Included 12 participants – Carroll Gary Barber, Charles Henry Booth, Ray Allen Cooper, Marilyn Irene Eisenberg, Robert Lewis Owens, Jean Estil Kidwell Pestana, David Lering Richards, Rose Schorr Rosenberg, Leon Russ Jr., Leo Vernon Washington, Douglas Albert Williams and Jack Mikhail Wolfson.)
July 16, 1961	Greyhound	Nashville, Tennessee	Jackson, Mississippi		(Note: Included 8 participants – James Emerson Dennis, Mary Freelon, Phillip Jay Havey, Rudolph Mitaritonna, Shirley B. Smith, Willard Hooker Svanoe, James Edward Warren and Lewis Richard Zuchman.)
July 21, 1961	Hawkins Field (airport terminal only)	Jackson, Mississippi			(Note: Included 9 participants – James T. Carey, Francis L. Geddes, Joseph Henry Gumbiner, Mary Jorgensen, Russell F. Jorgensen, Allan Levine, Orville B. Luster, Charles G. Sellers and John R. Washington.)
July 21, 1961	Greyhound	Nashville, Tennessee	Jackson, Mississippi		(Note: Included 4 participants – Paul Breines, Donna Sage Garde, Joel Ben Greenberg and Ruth Esther Moskowitz.)
July 23, 1961	Trailways	Nashville, Tennessee	Jackson, Mississippi		(Note: Included 7 participants – Albert Roy Huddleston, Margaret Ihra, Candida Lall, Morton G. Linder, Michael Harry Powell, Alexander Weiss and Ralph Alan Williams.)
July 24, 1961	Hawkins Field (airport)	Montgomery, Alabama	Jackson, Mississippi		(Note: Included 4 participants – Alphonso Kelly Petway, Kredelle Petway, Matthew Petway and Cecil A. Thomas.)
July 29, 1961	Greyhound	Nashville, Tennessee	Jackson, Mississippi		(Note: Included 10 participants – Byron Baer, Hilmar Ehrenfreid Pabel, Catherine Jo Prensky, Sally Rowley, Judith Norene Scroggins, Rick Stanley Sheviakov, Woollcott Smith, Widijonaiko Tjokroadisunatto, Norma Wagner and Ellen Lee Ziskind.)
July 30, 1961	Illinois Central Railroad	New Orleans, Louisiana	Jackson, Mississippi		(Note: Included 15 participants – Albert Barough, Winston Fuller, Joseph Edward Gerbac, Michael Grubbs, Alan Kaufman, William Leons, Herbert S. Mann, Max Gregory Pavesic, Philip M. Posner, Helen Singleton, Robert Singleton, Richard C. Steward, Lonnie Thurman, Sam Joe Townsend and Tanya Wren.)
July 31, 1961	Greyhound Bus Station (terminal only)	Jackson, Mississippi			(Note: Included 1 participant – James Robert Wahlstrom.)
August 5, 1961	Trailways (bus and terminal)	Nashville, Tennessee	Jackson, Mississippi		(Note: Included 2 participants – Earl C. Bohannon and Norma Wagner.)
August 13, 1961	Tri-State Trailways station (terminal only)	Jackson, Mississippi			(Note: Included 2 participants – George Raymond Jr. and Pauline K. Sims.)

== Commemorations and monument ==
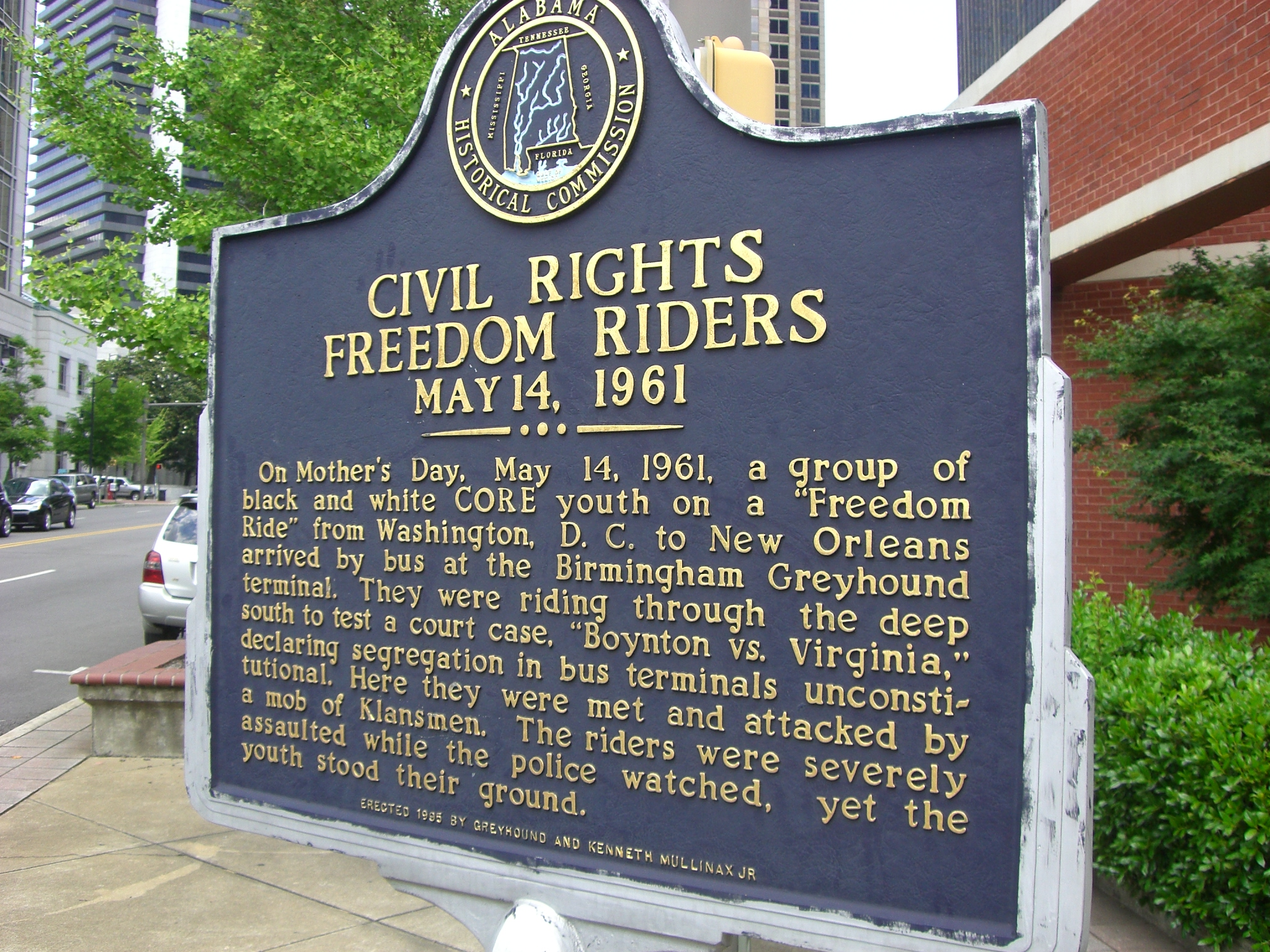
Freedom Riders plaque in Birmingham, Alabama

In celebration of the 50th anniversary of the Freedom Rides, Oprah Winfrey invited all living Freedom Riders to join her television program to celebrate their legacy. The episode aired on May 4, 2011.

On May 6–16, 2011, 40 college students from across the United States embarked on a bus ride from Washington, D.C., to New Orleans, retracing the original route of the Freedom Riders. The 2011 Student Freedom Ride, which was sponsored by PBS and American Experience, commemorated the 50th anniversary of the original Freedom Rides. Students met with civil rights leaders along the way and traveled with original Freedom Riders such as Ernest "Rip" Patton, Joan Mulholland, Bob Singleton, Helen Singleton, Jim Zwerg, and Charles Person. On May 16, 2011, PBS aired a documentary called Freedom Riders.

On May 19–21, 2011, the Freedom Rides were commemorated in Montgomery, Alabama, at the new Freedom Rides Museum in the old Greyhound Bus terminal, where some of the violence had taken place in 1961. On May 22–26, 2011, the arrival of the Freedom Rides in Jackson, Mississippi was commemorated with a 50th Anniversary Reunion and Conference in the city. During commemorative events in February 2013 in Montgomery, Congressman John Lewis accepted the apologies of Chief Kevin Murphy of the Montgomery Police Department; Murphy gave Lewis his own badge, off his uniform, moving Lewis to tears.

In late 2011, Palestinian activists, inspired by the Freedom Riders, used the same methods in Israel by boarding a bus from which they were excluded.

In January, 2017, President Barack Obama declared the Anniston, Alabama bus station the Freedom Riders National Monument.

== Cultural depictions ==
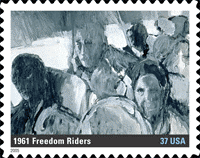
A 2005 U.S. postage stamp featuring a painting of the Freedom Riders by May Stevens

The 1980s PBS documentary series Eyes on the Prize had an episode, "Ain't Scared of Your Jails: 1960-1961", that gave attention to the Freedom Riders. It included an interview with James Farmer.

The title of the 2007 film Freedom Writers is an explicit pun on the Freedom Riders, a fact made clear in the film itself, which references the campaign.

PBS in 2012 broadcast Freedom Riders as part of its American Experience series. It included interviews and news footage from the Freedom Riders movement.

Dan Shore's 2013 opera Freedom Ride, set in New Orleans, celebrates the Freedom Riders.

The Boondocks aired a 2014 episode about the Freedom Rides with the title "Freedom Ride or Die".

The Freedom Riders: The Civil Rights Musical is a theater musical retelling the story of the Freedom Rides. The musical was created by Los Angeles screenwriter/director Richard Allen, and San Diego native music artist Taran Gray. Richard and Taran finalized the music in March 2016, and by April of the same year were asked to perform excerpts from their musical as a BETA Event at the New York Musical Festival (NYMF). The FREEDOM RIDERS musical received NYMF's inaugural BETA Event Award, and is scheduled to return to New York, summer of 2017, for an Off-Broadway run as part of NYMF's festival.

== Notable Freedom Riders ==
- Zev Aelony
- James Bevel
- Albert Bigelow
- Malcolm Boyd
- Amos C. Brown
- Gordon Carey
- Stokely Carmichael
- William Sloane Coffin
- Benjamin Elton Cox
- Israel S. Dresner
- James Farmer
- Bob Filner
- James Forman
- Tom Hayden
- Mary Hamilton
- William E. Harbour
- Genevieve Hughes
- Bernard Lafayette
- James Lawson
- Frederick Leonard
- Margaret Burr Leonard
- John Lewis
- Robert Martinson
- Salynn McCollum
- Charles McDew
- Winonah Myers
- Diane Nash
- Wally Nelson
- James Peck
- Charles Person
- Robert Laughlin Pierson
- John Curtis Raines
- Cordell Reagon
- Meryle Joy Reagon
- Charles Grier Sellers
- Charles Sherrod
- Fred Shuttlesworth
- Carol Ruth Silver
- Helen Singleton
- George Bundy Smith
- Jerome Smith
- Ruby Doris Smith-Robinson
- Peter Sterling
- Daniel N. Stern
- Hank Thomas
- Joan Trumpauer Mulholland
- C. T. Vivian
- Wyatt Tee Walker
- James Zwerg
- Janet Braun-Reinitz

== See also ==
- The Freedom Rider, a 1964 album by Art Blakey and the Jazz Messengers, named in honor of the Freedom Riders
- "He Was My Brother", a 1964 Simon & Garfunkel song about the Freedom Riders
- Breach of Peace: Portraits of the 1961 Mississippi Freedom Riders, a 2008 book by Eric Etheridge
- Redlining
- Reverse Freedom Rides
- George Lincoln Rockwell Hate Bus
- Freedom Ride (Australia)

== Bibliography ==
- Arsenault, Raymond (2006). Freedom Riders: 1961 and the Struggle for Racial Justice. Oxford University Press. ISBN 9780199755813. - Article on the book: Freedom Riders: 1961 and the Struggle for Racial Justice
- Branch, Taylor (2007). Parting the Waters: America in the King Years 1954–63. Simon and Schuster. ISBN 9781416558682.
- Forman, James (1972). The Making of Black Revolutionaries. University of Washington Press. ISBN 9780295976594.
- Morgenroth, Florence (1966). Organization and Activities of the American Civil Liberties Union in Miami, 1955–1966 (M.A. thesis). University of Miami. OCLC 15796239.
- Morris, Tiyi (2015). Womanpower Unlimited and the Black Freedom Struggle in Mississippi. Athens, Georgia: The University of Georgia Press. ISBN 978-0-8203-4731-8.
- Tyson, Timothy B. (2001). Radio Free Dixie: Robert F. Williams and the Roots of Black Power. University of North Carolina Press. ISBN 9780807849231.
- Upchurch, Thomas Adams (2008). Race Relations in the United States, 1960–1980. Westport, Connecticut: Greenwood Press. ISBN 9780313341717.
