= Sally Rowley =

American jeweler and civil rights activist (1931–2020)

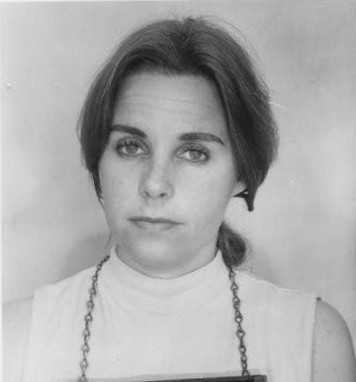
- Rowley's 1961 mugshot
- Born: Sara Jane Rowley; October 20, 1931; Trenton, New Jersey, U.S.
- Died: May 14, 2020 (aged 88); Tucson, Arizona, U.S.
- Education: Stephens College
- Occupations: Civil rights advocate, aircraft pilot, flight attendant, secretary, jeweler, hawker
- Employer: American Airlines

Sara Jane "Sally" Rowley (October 20, 1931 – May 14, 2020) was an American jewelry-maker and civil rights activist.

== Early life and education ==
Rowley was born in Trenton, New Jersey, the daughter of Emos Rowley and Sara Rowley. She graduated from Stephens College in Missouri. At Stephens, she learned to fly small planes and worked as a flight attendant for American Airlines after graduation.

== Activism ==
Rowley worked as a secretary in New York in the 1950s and early 1960s. In 1959, she was aboard a plane hijacked by Cuban gunmen. She joined the Freedom Riders, who rode interstate buses into the segregated Southern United States to challenge the non-enforcement of the Supreme Court's ruling that segregated public buses were unconstitutional. She was arrested with other Freedom Riders by Jackson County police in July 1961. After serving time in Mississippi State Penitentiary she returned to New York, but later lived in Mexico, Guatemala, Hawaii, California, and New Mexico, making and selling her jewelry.

== Personal life and death ==
Rowley's partner was artist Felix Pasilis; they never formally married, but lived and worked together from the 1960s until his death in 2018. They had children, Sofie and Oliver, and raised his daughter, Beatrice.

She died from COVID-19 in May 2020, at age 88, after it swept through her Tucson, Arizona, nursing home amid the COVID-19 pandemic in Arizona. Her granddaughter, Anika Pasilis, wrote an op-ed essay about attending Rowley's deathbed through a window at the nursing home.
