= Catherine Burks-Brooks =

American civil rights activist (1939–2023)

- Born: October 8, 1939 near Selma, Alabama, U.S.
- Died: July 3, 2023 (aged 83); Birmingham, Alabama, U.S.
- Occupations: Civil rights activist, teacher, social worker, jewelry retailer, and newspaper editor
- Known for: Freedom Rides

Catherine Burks-Brooks (October 8, 1939 – July 3, 2023) was an American civil rights movement activist, teacher, social worker, jewelry retailer, and newspaper editor.

== Early life ==
Burks was born on October 8, 1939, near Selma, Alabama, she was however raised in Birmingham, Alabama.

Burks was a student at Tennessee State University. Burks was active in the Mississippi movement and was the co-editor of Mississippi Free Press from 1962 to 1963. Burks taught as an elementary school teacher in 1964. In 1965–1966 she worked as a social worker in Detroit, she later became a jeweler specializing in African jewelry and clothing.

== Involvement in the Civil Rights Movement ==
Burks participated in multiple Freedom Rides including a Freedom Ride from Nashville, Tennessee to Montgomery, Alabama from May 17–21, 1961.

Burks heard about the Freedom Rides from a man named John Lewis. She began to participate in demonstrations he led. In an interview, she states "We had been demonstrating, we had been to jail several times as a matter of fact. I've also been in jail here in Birmingham before the Freedom Ride".

On the second day of the Freedom Ride, May 18, Burks recalled bantering with a segregationist and Birmingham Public Safety Commissioner, Bull Connor as he drove Nashville freedom riders back to the Tennessee state line from jail.

Two days later Burks was caught in the middle of a riot at the Montgomery Greyhound Bus Station. In the film Freedom Riders, Burks clearly recalled an assault on fellow Freedom Rider, Jim Zwerg.

Burks later witnessed a siege of the First Baptist Church by angry segregationists on the following day.

Later in August 1961, she married Freedom Rider Paul Brooks. They later participated in the Mississippi voter registration movement, and co-edited the Mississippi Free Press from 1962 to 1963.

== Personal life ==
Burks lived in the Bahamas in the 1970s before relocating back to Birmingham, Alabama in 1979.

Burks became a district sales manager for Avon cosmetics in 1982, until 1998. Burks worked as a substitute teacher in Birmingham.

Burks resided in a suburb outside of Birmingham, Alabama, volunteering her time by speaking to groups about her involvement in the Freedom Rides until her death on July 3, 2023, at the age of 83.
