= Gordon Carey =

American civil rights worker (1932–2021)

Gordon Ray Carey (January 7, 1932 – November 27, 2021) was an American civil rights worker and Freedom Rider.

== Life ==
Carey was born on January 7, 1932, in Grand Rapids, Michigan to Marguerite (Jellema) Carey and Howard Ray Carey. His mother was a homemaker and his father was a Methodist minister and pacifist active in the local chapter of the Congress of Racial Equality (CORE).

In 1953, Carey registered as a conscientious objector and was consequently arrested by the Federal Bureau of Investigation and charged with draft evasion. Sentenced to 3 years, he spent a year in a minimum-security prison outside Tucson, Arizona. Upon his release, he took courses at Pasadena City College.

As part of the Civil Rights movement, Carey participated in sit-ins at segregated lunch counters and ran workshops to train hundreds of other people in civil disobedience. Carey also helped conceive of the idea for Freedom Rides - groups of Black and white activists who rode together on interstate buses to draw attention to a landmark 1960 U.S. Supreme Court decision that barred segregation by race on all forms of public transportation.

In the 1970s, Carey played a role in ultimately unsuccessful attempt to create a racially integrated utopian community called "Soul City."

== Personal life ==
Carey married Betye Boyd in 1959. They had two children, Kristina and Anthony Carey. Carey and Boyd divorced and he married Karen Wilken in 1974. Wilken and Carey had a daughter, Ramona.

Carey died on November 27, 2021, in Arlington County, Virginia.
