= Ralph Lord Roy =

American pastor (1928–2020)

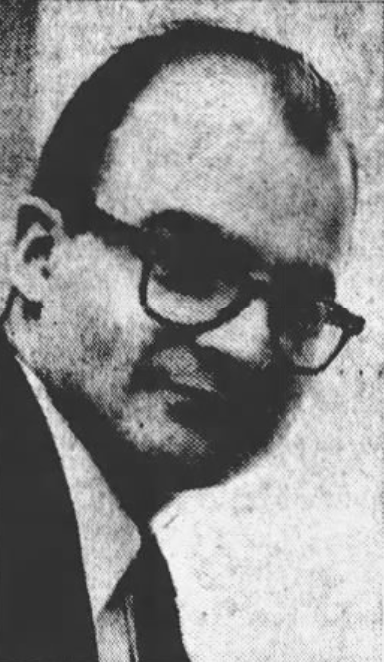
Roy circa 1960

Ralph Lord Roy (September 30, 1928 – 2020) was a Methodist pastor and author, as well as a Freedom Rider and activist in the Civil rights movement. Roy's 1953 book, Apostles of Discord, was based on his doctoral dissertation at Union Theological Seminary. It included the first published history of the Christian Identity movement.

== Background ==
Ralph Lord Roy was born on September 30, 1928, in St. Albans, Vermont. He was the son of Howard Allen and Olive Lydia (Corliss) Roy. He graduated from Swarthmore College in 1950. After graduation, he began attending Columbia Law school. After a year, he felt called to attend Union Theological Seminary.

He was ordained by bishop Garfield Bromley Oxnam. After his ordination, he served several churches in New York City and Connecticut.

Roy's first book, Apostles of Discord, began as his doctoral thesis. It discussed some of the racist elements hiding within American Protestantism and was the first published history of the emerging Christian Identity movement.

In 1953, he covered Oxnam's appearance before the House Un-American Activities Committee in 1953. A copy of Roy's book, Apostles of Discord, was included with materials Oxnam used when testifying before the committee.

In 2005, he received a Doctor of Humanitarian Services from Briarwood College.

== Civil rights movement ==
Roy was part of the Interfaith Freedom Ride from Washington, D.C. to Tallahassee, Florida June 13–16, 1961, an act that resulted in jail time.

After meeting with Martin Luther King Jr. in the summer of 1962, Roy and Israel Dresner organized a "prayer pilgrimage" on August 28, 1962, in Albany, Georgia. The pilgrimage resulted in the largest jailing of clergy in American history.

In 1994, he received the Unitarian Universalist Church Humanitarian of the Year award, recognizing his work with the civil rights movement, and his activism with MLK.

== Writer and author ==
Ralph Lord Roy was a writer and an author.

For 20 years, he was a columnist covering social, political, and religious topics for the Record Journal in Meriden, Connecticut.

=== Books ===
- Apostles of Discord (1953)
- Communism and the Churches (1960)
