= William E. Harbour =

American civil rights activist (1942–2020)

- Born: Piedmont, Alabama
- Known for: Civil rights activist

William E. Harbour (January 9, 1942 – August 27, 2020) was an American civil rights activist who participated in the Freedom Rides. He was one of several youth activists involved in the latter actions, along with John Lewis, William Barbee, Paul Brooks, Charles Butler, Allen Cason, Catherine Burks, and Lucretia Collins.

== Early life and education ==
Harbour was born on January 9, 1942, in Piedmont, Alabama. His father was a cotton mill worker at the Standard Coosa Thatcher mill and the owner of the OK Barbershop — Piedmont’s only black barbershop at the time —, while his mother worked as a cook to local families.

Although his father hoped that he would take over the barbershop, Harbour was determined to become the first person in his family to attend college. Following a rejection by Jacksonville State University in 1960, he was able to fulfill this dream upon admission to Tennessee State University the following year.

== Civil Rights activism ==
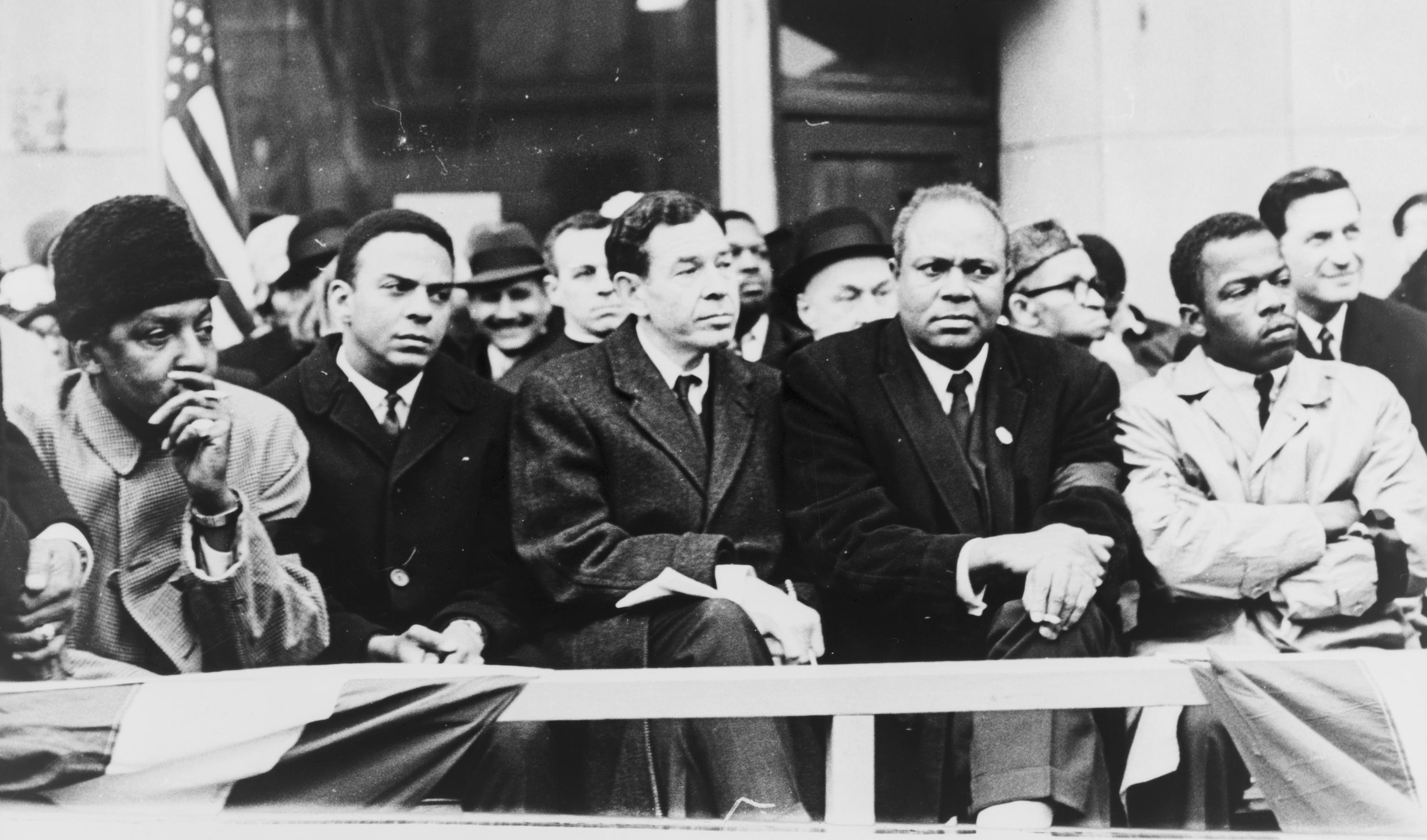

Soon after arriving in Tennessee, Harbour joined the Student Central Committee of the Nashville Christian Leadership Council at the behest of John Lewis, a fellow activist and close friend (the two had met on a bus ride to a rally in Rock Hill, South Carolina). While at the university, he participated in numerous acts of civil disobedience, including "sit-in, stand-in, picketing and marching activities as a function of the civil rights movement." His activism brought him to Rock Hill, SC where he served jail time with other students imprisoned after a lunch counter sit-in.

Out of a large number of volunteers, Harbour was one of only a few selected to take part in the first Freedom Rides; other participants included seven blacks — John Lewis, William Barbee, Paul Brooks, Charles Butler, Allen Cason Jr., Catherine Burks and Lucretia Collins —, and two whites — James Zwerg and Salynn McCollum. Harbour's involvement led to his arrest twice in rapid succession. The first arrest occurred in Montgomery at the tail end of a Nashville (May 17) – Montgomery (May 21) Freedom Ride. The second arrest occurred on May 28, 1961, at the end of a Nashville (via Memphis) – Jackson, Mississippi Freedom Ride, and resulted in Harbour's imprisonment for 30 days.

In Montgomery, Harbour was the first activist to exit the bus as it arrived at the Montgomery Greyhound Bus Station – and thus the first to encounter the waiting mob. Although he survived the resultant riot (and subsequent imprisonment in Jackson), upon return to Tennessee he and 14 other students were expelled from Tennessee State University due to their involvement in the civil rights movement.

While Harbour’s difficulties were far from unique, the pattern of "brutality and jail terms" which he and his fellow activists encountered not only strengthened the Freedom Riders' resolve, but also increased publicity and motivated others to join them.

== After the Freedom Ride ==
Following his expulsion from Tennessee State University, Harbour’s mother advised him against returning to Piedmont due to fear for his safety. Consequently, from 1961 to 1966 he made only "one brief visit" home.

In late 1961, Harbour was reinstated to Tennessee State University. After a short stint as a Georgia school teacher, and a period of involvement in the War on Poverty under President Johnson, he became a federal civil servant "specializing in U.S. Army base closings".

Residing in Atlanta, Georgia, Harbour remained "an active alumnus" of Tennessee State University. The Atlanta Alumni Association sponsors a scholarship named in his honor, The William E. Harbour Academic Scholarship.
