= Winonah Myers =

American political activist (1941–2018)

Winonah Beamer
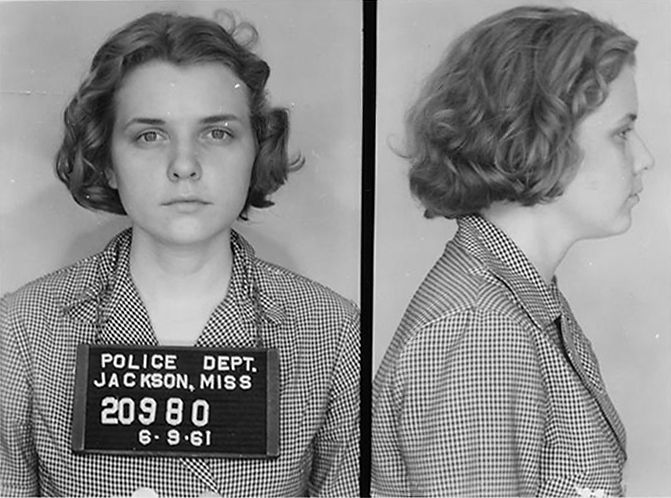
- Born: September 10, 1941; Cleveland, Ohio, U.S.
- Died: March 16, 2018 (aged 76)
- Occupation: activist
- Spouse: David Myers (m. 1962)

Margaret Winonah Beamer Myers (September 10, 1941 – March 16, 2018) was an American political activist, who, in 1961 at the age of 19, became a Freedom Rider. Freedom Riders were civil rights activists who rode interstate buses into the segregated southern United States in 1961 and following years to challenge the non-enforcement of the United States Supreme Court decisions Irene Morgan v. Commonwealth of Virginia (1946) and Boynton v. Virginia (1960). She was arrested in Jackson, Mississippi and spent almost six months in Mississippi State Penitentiary, better known as Parchman Farm, the oldest prison and the only maximum-security prison for men in the state of Mississippi. Of all the Freedom Riders, white or black, Winonah Beamer served the longest sentence and was the only Freedom Rider who served her full term.

A white student at historically black Central State University in Wilberforce, Ohio, she joined the Freedom Riders in the summer of 1961. Winonah Beamer joined four other activists on a train from Nashville, Tennessee to Jackson, Mississippi, where they were arrested in the Illinois Central terminal on June 9, 1961. While in prison she refused bail and refused to file an appeal, later saying, "I didn't think it would be recorded if no one had done the time." Jailed on June 11, 1961, she was in prison system until Christmas Day of that year. She spent most of her time in prison near the men's death row and was able to talk to some of the death row inmates through the vents.

Winonah Beamer was among 436 black and white activists who eventually and successfully broke the system. She said, "Our feeling at the time was, 'We're going to keep coming and we're going to flood your jails, cram your dockets and break you financially,' "

David Myers and Winonah Beamer married in 1962. She spent most of her life working with people with intellectual disabilities at a number of places in Ohio, including 22 years with the Montgomery County Board of Mental Retardation. She lived in Tampa Bay, Florida, with her husband until her death.
