= Joan Pleune =

Civil rights activist

Joan Pleune was one of the original Freedom Riders during the Civil Rights Movement in 1961. She was arrested for participating in the bus trip against segregation from New Orleans, Louisiana to Jackson, Mississippi. Now Pleune participates in the Granny Peace Brigades and has been arrested several times for her activist work.

== Early life and education ==
Joan Pleune was born in Newark, New Jersey and grew up in Livingston, New Jersey. She has younger sister named Kit. She first attended the University of North Carolina and then attended the University of California, Berkeley where she majored in experimental psychology.

== Freedom Rides ==
The Freedom Riders were a group of people, both black and white, who sat on a bus, completely rejecting the idea of segregation. When the buses would arrive at their destination stop, the group would be met by rioting mobs and KKK members. People were attacked as soon as they stepped off the bus. The police were of little help as well, leading the group of riders to be beaten and arrested. Pleune herself was arrested and spent time in jail and faced being a "race traitor."

== Granny Peace Brigade ==
In recent years, Pleune has continued to remain active in fighting for human life. The Granny Peace Brigades is an organization that was started by a group of women who wanted to enlist in war so grandchildren overseas could come home. Now the group partakes in various protests against war and to initiate peace instead. Within the past several years, she has been arrested at least fifteen times and still remains active. In an interview, Pleune notes that the Granny Peace Brigade is a global movement compared to the civil rights Freedom Rides, where the group was targeting a specific single issue.
