= Janet Braun-Reinitz =

American painter

- Born: Janet Braun
- Occupations: Painter, muralist
- Years active: 1961–2023
- Known for: Freedom Riders
- Notable work: "An Interracial Journey"

Janet Braun-Reinitz (1938 – 2023) was a muralist, painter and activist committed to social justice. Her ongoing involvement in civil rights activism began in 1961 when she was a Freedom Rider. During one incident in Little Rock, Arkansas, she was arrested and was jailed from July 8 to 15. She subsequently worked at the national office of CORE and was the head of the CORE chapter in Rochester, NY in 1962–3. She was the subject of the documentary, Interview with Janet Braun-Reinitz for the Freedom Riders 40th Anniversary Oral History Project, 2001, published by the University of Mississippi, excerpts are included in the film, The Children Shall Lead (2001).

In 1983, she co-founded Tasteful Ladies for Peace of Ithaca, New York. This organization was involved in peaceful protests promoting reproductive choice and protesting against the proliferation of nuclear weapons.

Braun-Reinitz then worked as a muralist and studio artist based in New York City. Since she began creating murals in 1984, Braun-Reinitz had painted more than 60 murals in seven countries, including India, Ghana, England, Georgia, Italy, Nicaragua and the United States. Her 3,300-square-foot mural titled "When Women Pursue Justice"' can be found in Brooklyn's Bedford-Stuyvesant neighborhood. This mural was created in collaboration with 12 other women artists and Artmakers Inc. (see documentary films, The Women of Nostrand and Greene, Dave Reinitz, H2F Productions, 2006; Beyond the Walls, Gail Embrey, Power Surge Productions, 2014.)

Her studio work is in collections as diverse as the Rock and Roll Hall of Fame, Oakland Museum of California, Bristol-Myers Squibb, PAD/D Archives and MOMA.

Braun-Reinitz died on May 3, 2023, at age 85.

== Publications ==
- ON THE WALL: Four Decades of Community Murals in New York City, Janet Braun-Reinitz and Jane Weissman, University Press of Mississippi, February 2009, ISBN 9781604731118
- The Mural Book: A Practical Guide for Educators, Janet Braun-Reinitz and Rochelle Shicoff, November 7, 2001, ISBN 978-1-56290-241-4.
