= Margaret Burr Leonard =

American journalist and activist

- Born: January 5, 1942
- Died: November 14, 2022 (aged 80)
- Education: Sophie Newcomb College
- Occupation: Journalist
- Known for: Freedom Rider

Margaret Burr Leonard (January 5, 1942 – November 14, 2022) was an American civil rights activist and journalist. She participated in Freedom Rides from Alabama to Mississippi, being noted as the first Southern white student to participate. She later worked as a reporter and editor for Florida newspapers.

== Early life and education ==
Leonard was born on January 5, 1942. Both her parents were newspaper reporters, with her mother being a proponent of racial integration. Leonard's mother was the first white woman to join the NAACP in Macon, Georgia. As a teenager, Leonard met both Martin Luther King Jr. and John Lewis.

While studying at Sophie Newcomb College in 1960, Leonard joined the Congress of Racial Equality (CORE). Through CORE, she began participating in protests and sit-ins, which included receiving training on "what to do when they try to kill you". Leonard was a Freedom Rider and rode bus routes between Southern cities to protest segregation laws. She was the first Southern white student to participate, causing authorities to worry "other white Southern dissidents would follow her lead". She was arrested in Jackson, Mississippi and spent time in Parchman Prison. She also spent time in Hinds County jail.

Leonard graduated from Sophie Newcomb College in 1963.

== Career ==
After graduation, Leonard worked as a writer for the U.S. Commission on Civil Rights. She went on to report for the Miami Herald and St. Petersburg Times in the 1970s and the Tallahassee Democrat in the 1980s. She worked as the editor for the Florida State Times, retiring in 2003.

Leonard cited both her time as a Freedom Rider and being incarcerated as inspiring her later journalist work. She was honored by Tulane University as an Outstanding Alumna of 2013 for her efforts to challenge racial segregation.
