= Ed Blankenheim =

American civil rights activist

- Born: March 16, 1934; Lake Benton, Minnesota
- Died: September 26, 2004 (aged 70); San Francisco, California
- Known for: Civil rights activist

Edward Norval "Ed" Blankenheim (March 16, 1934 – September 26, 2004) was an American civil rights activist and one of the original 13 Freedom Riders who rode Greyhound buses in 1961 as part of the Civil Rights Movement, in an effort to desegregate transit systems.

== Biography ==
Blankenheim was born on March 16, 1934, in Lake Benton, Minnesota. He moved with his family to Chicago at age 10. He served in the US Marine Corps at the age of 16 in the Korean War and observed Southern racism during his time in the Corps.

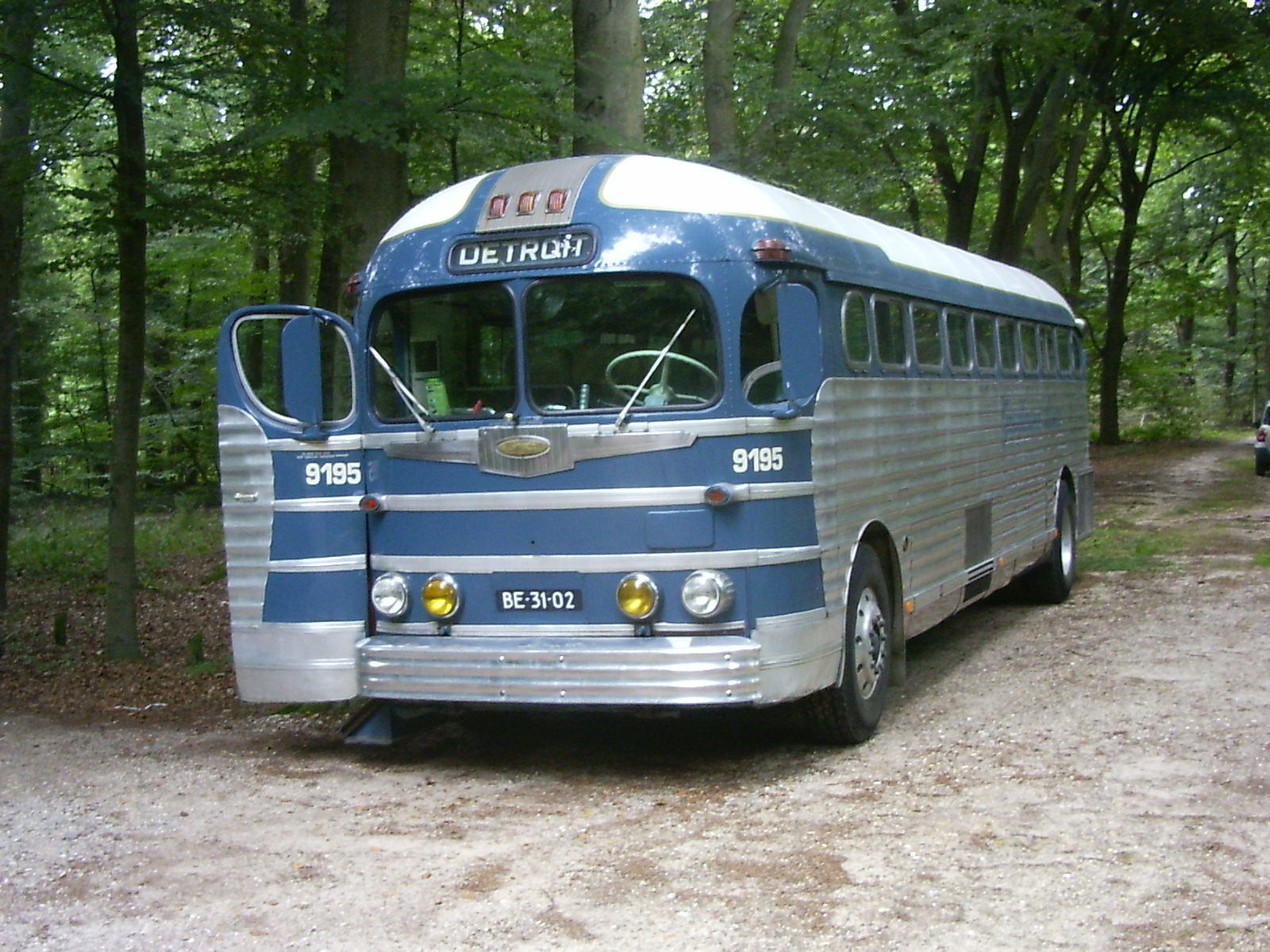
A Greyhound bus during the 1950s, similar to the ones that the Freedom Riders would have traveled on.

While studying chemistry at the University of Arizona and being a carpenter's apprentice, he became involved with the Civil Rights Movement, and joined the Congress of Racial Equality (CORE). Ed was one of the few white people who participated in local civil rights activities. He started out by becoming involved with NAACP Youth Council in Tucson, Arizona and later became a leader for a division of CORE known as Students for Equality. In 1961, thirteen civil rights workers boarded buses to test the United States Supreme Court ruling Boynton v. Virginia (1960) that outlawed segregation in all interstate public facilities. The objective was to travel on interstate buses into the southern United States practicing non-violent protests that challenged the practice of Jim Crow travel laws. The participants encountered violent protests the further south they traveled and endured countless violent actions, threats, beatings, and even the risk of death every time they traveled to a new bus station.

During the journey and upon arriving in Anniston, Alabama an angry mob attacked the Greyhound bus. The mob firebombed the bus, but the passengers managed to escape. The riders were regrouped by the mob and severely beaten. Ed was hit in the face with a tire iron and lost several teeth. Police looked away as the riders were severely beaten by the angry mob. The mob even threatened to blow up the plane the freedom riders were getting on to head for Montgomery the next day. Facing danger, injury, and death Ed managed to survive the attack.

He was interviewed on National Public Radio in 2001 on the 40th anniversary of the Freedom Rides. That year he rode on a bus to recreate the first Freedom Ride, but this time was welcomed as a hero, in contrast to the beatings and bus burning of 1961. He and his wife Nancy had one son and two daughters.

After the attack, Ed later lost the use of the right side of his body. He also suffered a stroke which is believed to be a result of the injuries he suffered from the attack. Ed died of cancer at 70 years old on Sunday September 26, 2004.
