= Charles Haynie =

Charles Haynie (1935–2001) was a long-time faculty member in the State University of New York at Buffalo's Social Sciences Interdisciplinary Degree Programs until his death in 2001. He provided advisement, taught statistics, and engaged students in a range of popular courses about grass roots organizing for social change, 20th century political movements, the environment, and social justice. Haynie graduated from Cornell University with a degree in Engineering Physics and in 1959 entered its graduate program in Mathematics. His specialty was the Lie algebras. His involvement in the social justice movements of the 1960s kept him from completing his graduate work. Nonetheless, math education continued to be an active interest of his.

== Tolstoy College ==
From 1969 to the mid-1980s, Haynie was the academic leader of Tolstoy College, also known as College F, which sponsored courses on left politics and social justice. Prior to Buffalo, he was active in the Civil Rights Movement, working as a field director to register Black voters in Tennessee and Mississippi. Haynie left his doctoral studies in mathematics and engineering research at Cornell University to join the movement. Tolstoy College was profiled by Jennifer Wilson in a piece for The New Yorker.

== Political activity ==
Haynie was one of the "Faculty 45"—faculty members arrested during an anti-war sit-in in Hayes Hall in 1970. He was a reform Democratic candidate for the Buffalo Common Council in 1979.

== Memorial award ==
Each year the Interdisciplinary Degree Program offers the Charles Haynie Memorial Award to honor a student who exemplifies Haynie's commitment to social justice. "Charles is remembered by his colleagues because he cared deeply about each individual student and demonstrated this concern through his involvement in the university, the local community and the nation," says the IDP.

== Personal life ==
Mr. Haynie was working on his memoir during the time he was struggling with cancer. They were published by the University of Tennessee Press in 2009 as A Memoir of the New Left: The Political Autobiography of Charles A. Haynie (edited by Aeron Haynie and Timothy S. Miller). The memoir highlight four periods of his life: (1) his political awakening at Cornell University (1959-1961), (2) his involvement in the Civil Rights Movement in the Deep South (1961-1964), (3) his experiences with the New Left and anti-war movement (late 1960s), and (4) his involvement in experimental education in Buffalo, New York (early 1970s).

Haynie retired in 2000 and died from cancer in 2001.
