= Deaths in May 2014 =

The following is a list of notable deaths in May 2014.

Entries for each day are listed alphabetically by surname. A typical entry lists information in the following sequence:

- Name, age, country of citizenship and reason for notability, established cause of death, reference.

== May 2014 ==
=== 1 ===
- John Allan, 86, Canadian naval officer.
- Adamu Atta, 86, Nigerian politician, Governor of Kwara State (1979–1983), member of the House of Representatives (1976–1979).
- Bjørn Barth, 83, Norwegian diplomat.
- Juan de Dios Castillo, 63, Mexican football player and coach (Cruz Azul, Honduras, El Salvador), skin cancer.
- Chou Meng-tieh, 92, Taiwanese poet and writer, multiple organ dysfunction syndrome.
- Clive Clark, 73, English footballer (West Bromwich Albion).
- Mel Clark, 87, American baseball player (Philadelphia Phillies).
- Radhia Cousot, 66, French computer scientist.
- Arthur Cromarty, 94, American judge, member of the New York Supreme Court, heart failure.
- Helgi Daníelsson, 85, Icelandic footballer.
- Assi Dayan, 68, Israeli film director and actor.
- Mark Elvins, 74, British priest and author, Warden of Greyfriars, Oxford (2007–2008).
- Hellmut Federhofer, 102, Austrian musicologist.
- Gordon H. Fitzgerald, 87, Canadian politician and lawyer, Nova Scotia MLA for Halifax (1960–1970), Speaker (1969–1970).
- Juan Formell, 71, Cuban musician, composer and director (Los Van Van).
- James A. Goodson, 93, American fighter pilot.
- Allen Kent, 92, American computer scientist.
- Spike Maynard, 71, American judge, member of the Supreme Court of Appeals of West Virginia (1996–2008).
- Salynn McCollum, 74, American civil rights activist (Freedom Riders).
- Peggy O'Shea, 91, American television writer (One Life to Live), complications from a stroke.
- John Wash Pam, 73, Nigerian politician, Senator for Plateau State, complications from prostate cancer.
- William F. Poe, 82, American politician, Mayor of Tampa, Florida (1974–1979).
- Paul Ramsay, 78, Australian billionaire health care (Ramsay Health Care), football (Sydney FC) and media (Prime Television) executive and philanthropist, heart attack.
- Peter Ruscuklic, 58, Australian VFL player (Fitzroy, Geelong).
- Heinz Schenk, 89, German television presenter and actor.
- Howard Smith, 77, American columnist (The Village Voice) and filmmaker (Marjoe), cancer.
- Albert Stokes, 81, English footballer (Grimsby Town, Ashford United, Southport).
- David Stoliar, 91, Romanian World War II soldier, sole survivor of the Struma disaster.
- Georg Stollenwerk, 83, German football player and coach (1. FC Köln).
- Kenneth Tomlinson, 69, American magazine editor (Reader's Digest) and media executive, chairman of the Corporation for Public Broadcasting, melanoma.
- Michael Travis, 86, American costume designer (Rowan & Martin's Laugh-In).
- Manfred von Richthofen, 80, German sports official, Director of the Deutscher Olympischer Sportbund (1994–2006).
- Paul Whetnall, 67, English badminton player and coach.
- Eli Woods, 91, English comedian and comic actor.
- Barbara Worley, 79, Australian sports administrator.
- Kōji Yada, 81, Japanese voice actor (One Piece, Dragon Ball, Saint Seiya), kidney failure.

=== 2 ===
- Tomás Balduino, 91, Brazilian Roman Catholic prelate, Bishop of Goiás (1967–1998).
- Sir Bill Benyon, 84, British politician, MP for Buckingham (1970–1983) and Milton Keynes (1983–1992).
- George Herbert Borts, 86, American economist.
- Chelokee, 10, American thoroughbred racehorse, euthanized.
- Jaroslav Cihlář, 90, Czech Olympic cyclist.
- Jessica Cleaves, 65, American singer (The Friends of Distinction, Earth, Wind & Fire), complications from a stroke.
- Martin Dent, 88, British academic, co-founder of Jubilee 2000.
- George Digby, 96, American baseball scout (Boston Red Sox).
- John E. Dolibois, 95, American diplomat, Ambassador to Luxembourg (1981–1985), last survivor of Nuremberg trials interrogation team.
- John Dungs, 62, Nigerian military officer, Governor of Delta State (1996–1998).
- Elio Guzzanti, 93, Italian doctor and politician, Minister of Health (1995–1996).
- Anwar Ahmed Khan, 80, Pakistani field hockey player, Olympic champion (1960) and dual silver medalist (1956, 1964).
- Andrey Korneyev, 40, Russian swimmer, Olympic bronze medalist (1996) and European aquatics champion (1995, 1997), stomach cancer.
- Mohammad-Reza Lotfi, 67, Iranian classical musician, cancer.
- Charles Marowitz, 80, American playwright, stage director and theatre critic, complications from Parkinson's disease.
- Moni Maker, 21, American trotter horse, Harness Horse of the Year (1998, 1999), complications from colic surgery.
- Marin Niculescu, 91, Romanian Olympic cyclist.
- Žarko Petan, 85, Slovene writer.
- Pom, 94, Belgian comic writer and artist.
- Nigel Stepney, 55, British Formula One mechanic (Ayrton Senna, Michael Schumacher), involved in 2007 Formula One espionage controversy, traffic collision.
- Ilse von Glatz, 55, Canadian actress (War of the Worlds).
- Pauline Wagner, 103, American actress and glamour girl.
- Efrem Zimbalist Jr., 95, American actor (The F.B.I., 77 Sunset Strip, Batman: The Animated Series).

=== 3 ===
- Agshin Alizadeh, 76, Soviet and Azerbaijani composer.
- Kofi Ansah, 62, Ghanaian fashion designer.
- Gary Becker, 83, American economist, Nobel Prize laureate in Economics (1992), complications following surgery.
- Les Carlson, 81, American-born Canadian actor (A Christmas Story, The Fly, The X-Files), cancer.
- Bruce Crabtree, 90, American architect and politician.
- Imre Danka, 83, Hungarian footballer.
- Vicki Darken, 91, Australian painter.
- James H. Daughdrill Jr., 80, American educator, President of Rhodes College (1973–1999).
- Dick Douglas, 82, Scottish politician, MP for Clackmannan and Eastern Stirlingshire (1970–1974), Dunfermline (1979–1983) and Dunfermline West (1983–1992).
- Bobby Gregg, 78, American drummer (Bob Dylan, Simon & Garfunkel) and record producer.
- Ben Hoberman, 92, American radio executive (KABC, ABC Radio), pioneered talk radio format in the United States, complications from lung cancer.
- Francisco Icaza, 83, Mexican modernist artist and writer.
- Chet Jastremski, 73, American swimmer, Olympic bronze medalist (1964) and 100-meter breaststroke world-record holder.
- Trine Krogh, 59, Norwegian Olympic swimmer (1972).
- Jim Oberstar, 79, American politician, member of the US House of Representatives for Minnesota's 8th District (1975–2011).
- John Westergaard, 86, British sociologist.
- John Hartley Williams, 72, British poet, cancer.

=== 4 ===
- Jack Agüeros, 79, American community activist, Alzheimer's disease.
- Eddie Andreini, 77, American stunt pilot, air crash.
- Kojo Armah, 68, Ghanaian diplomat, lawyer and politician.
- Dick Ayers, 90, American comic book artist (Fantastic Four, Ghost Rider, Sgt. Fury and his Howling Commandos).
- Elena Baltacha, 30, Ukrainian-born British tennis player, liver cancer.
- William Bender, 83, American entertainment critic and magazine editor (Time), heart failure.
- Edgar Cortright, 90, American scientist and engineer.
- Pierre Derivery, 88, French Olympic sprint canoer.
- Alan J. Friedman, 71, American physicist, pancreatic cancer.
- Harrison G. Gough, 93, American psychologist.
- Mike Hawker, 77, English songwriter.
- Nestor Jacono, 89, Maltese Olympic sprinter (1948).
- Helga Königsdorf, 75, East German physicist and author, Parkinson's disease.
- Ross Lonsberry, 67, Canadian hockey player (Philadelphia Flyers, Los Angeles Kings, Pittsburgh Penguins), cancer.
- Jean-Paul Ngoupandé, 65, Central African politician, Prime Minister (1996–1997).
- Al Pease, 92, British-born Canadian Hall of Fame racing driver (Formula One).
- Andrew Quintero, 51, American scientist and entrepreneur (JumpStartFund), drowned.
- Stanley Rosen, 84, American philosopher.
- Tatiana Samoilova, 80, Soviet-born Russian actress (The Cranes Are Flying, Anna Karenina), People's Artist (1993), complications from a heart condition.
- Dana Seetahal, 58, Trinidadian politician and legal academic, MP (2002–2010), shot.
- Tony Settember, 87, Filipino-born American racing driver and engineer.
- Bohdan Skaradziński, 83, Polish writer and social activist.
- Phyllis Stern, 88, American professor and nursing theorist.
- William Worthy, 92, American newspaper journalist, challenged travel restrictions to Communist countries, complications from Alzheimer's disease.

=== 5 ===
- Timothy John Byford, 72, British-born Serbian television director, multiple myeloma.
- Butler Derrick, 77, American politician, member of the House of Representatives for South Carolina (1975–1995) and SC House of Representatives (1969–1975), cancer.
- Dave Diamond, 77, American radio disc jockey and rock music journalist, pneumonia.
- Gerhard Dommrich, 81, German Olympic sport shooter.
- Billy Frank Jr., 83, American Nisqually tribal fishing rights activist.
- Jean Gaven, 92, French film actor.
- Daniel R. Gernatt Sr., 97, American businessman.
- Elaine Green, 73, American television journalist (WCPO), recipient of the Peabody Award (1981).
- Harold Haering, 83, American politician, member of the Kentucky House of Representatives, Senator (1983–1988).
- Amik Kasoruho, 81, Albanian author and publicist, pulmonary disease.
- Eduardo Mac Entyre, 85, Argentine artist.
- Lorne Maeck, 88, Canadian politician.
- István Major, 64, Hungarian Olympic high jumper (1972, 1976).
- Clifton Mayne, 80, American tennis player.
- Michael Otedola, 87, Nigerian politician, Governor of Lagos State (1999–2007), complications from a stroke.
- Sven Sønsteby, 80, Norwegian illustrator.
- Jackie Lynn Taylor, 88, American actress and television personality (Our Gang), Alzheimer's disease.
- Lynn R. Williams, 89, Canadian labor unionist, President of the United Steelworkers (1983–1994), Parkinson's disease.

=== 6 ===
- Wil Albeda, 88, Dutch politician, Minister of Social Affairs (1977–1981), member of the Senate (1966–1977, 1981–1983).
- Virginia Belmont, 92, American actress.
- William Costello, 81, American politician.
- William H. Dana, 83, American NASA test pilot (X-15 rocket), complications from Parkinson's disease.
- Georges Delahaie, 80, French sculptor.
- Roger Dimmock, 78, British rear admiral, Naval Secretary (1985–1987).
- Jimmy Ellis, 74, American boxer, WBA heavyweight champion (1968–1970), dementia.
- Billy Harrell, 85, American baseball (Cleveland Indians) and basketball player (Siena Saints).
- Antony Hopkins, 93, British composer, conductor and pianist.
- Larry Ivie, 77, American comic artist and writer, lung cancer.
- Maria Lassnig, 94, Austrian artist.
- Livio Maritano, 88, Italian Roman Catholic prelate, Bishop of Acqui (1979–2000).
- Farley Mowat, 92, Canadian author (People of the Deer, Lost in the Barrens, Never Cry Wolf).
- Bill Nunn, 89, American editor (Pittsburgh Courier) and football executive (Pittsburgh Steelers), complications from a stroke.
- William Olvis, 56, American film and television music composer (Dr. Quinn, Medicine Woman), throat cancer.
- Bud Osborn, 66, Canadian poet and activist.
- Học Phi, 101, Vietnamese dramatist and scriptwriter.
- Aziz Sattar, 88, Malaysian actor, complications from a heart attack.
- Joyce Stevens, 86, Australian activist and historian.
- Leslie Thomas, 83, Welsh author (The Virgin Soldiers).
- Cedric Thornberry, 77, British lawyer, Assistant-Secretary-General of the United Nations.
- Lex Watson, 71, Australian LGBT rights activist and political scientist.
- Lois Rhame West, 92, American healthcare and physical fitness advocate (Muscular Dystrophy Association), First Lady of South Carolina (1971–1975).

=== 7 ===
- Al Bahathri, 32, American-bred British-trained Thoroughbred racehorse. (death announced on this date)
- Nazim Al-Haqqani, 92, Cypriot Islamic Sufism prelate and scholar, multiple organ failure.
- G R 'Jock' Bryce, 93, British pilot.
- Raúl Baca Carbo, 82, Ecuadorian engineer and politician.
- Sir George Christie, 79, British opera manager (Glyndebourne Festival Opera).
- Stanford Darger, 93, American politician, member of the Utah House of Representatives.
- Manuel Jiménez de Parga, 85, Spanish politician.
- Pierre Descaves, 89, French politician.
- Dale Evans, 77, American football player.
- Tony Genaro, 72, American actor (Tremors, World Trade Center, The Mask of Zorro).
- Ramón Vega Hidalgo, 80, Chilean military officer and politician, Commander-in-chief of the Air Force (1991–1995).
- Zundel Kroizer, 89, Israeli rabbi.
- Edward Laufer, 75, Canadian music theorist and composer.
- Sir Neville McNamara, 91, Australian defence chief.
- Samrath Lal Meena, 79, Indian politician, Rajasthan MLA for Rajgarh, Speaker (1998–1999).
- William Meyers, 70, South African featherweight boxer, Olympic bronze medalist (1960).
- Colin Pillinger, 70, British planetary scientist, brain haemorrhage.
- David Prentice, 77, British artist.
- Wilbur Rakestraw, 85, American race car driver (NASCAR), heart failure.
- Rashid Rehman, 55, Pakistani lawyer, shot.
- Paul Stalder, 84, Swiss Olympic sprinter.
- Elaine Sturtevant, 89, American pop and minimalist artist.
- Kelly E. Taggart, 81, American rear admiral and civil engineer, director of the National Oceanic and Atmospheric Administration Commissioned Officer Corps.
- Dick Welteroth, 86, American baseball player (Washington Senators).
- Martha Wilkinson, 72, American literacy campaigner, First Lady of Kentucky (1987–1991), natural causes.
- Lawrence Williams, 59, Guyanese finance official, Governor for the Bank of Guyana (since 2005), cancer.

=== 8 ===
- Bill Coughlin, 91, American newspaper journalist (Los Angeles Times), editor (Washington Daily News) and novelist, Pulitzer Prize winner for Public Service (1990).
- Roger L. Easton, 93, American scientist, inventor and designer of GPS.
- Jens Christian Hansen, 82, Norwegian geographer.
- Robert Hess, 78, American sculptor.
- George Kohut, 70, Ukrainian-born American camera operator (Batman Begins, Ferris Bueller's Day Off, The Fugitive).
- Yago Lamela, 36, Spanish Olympic athlete (2000, 2004), heart attack.
- Homero Leite Meira, 82, Brazilian Roman Catholic prelate, Bishop of Itabuna (1978–1980) and Irecê (1980–1983).
- Beverly Long, 81, American actress (Rebel Without a Cause, Father Knows Best).
- Herb Lotman, 80, American businessman, complications from heart failure.
- Nancy Malone, 79, American television producer and director (Dynasty) and actress (Naked City), leukemia-induced pneumonia.
- Leo Marentette, 73, American baseball player (Detroit Tigers, Montreal Expos), heart attack.
- Charlie Mead, 93, Canadian baseball player (New York Giants).
- Harry Potter, 72, Australian television journalist (Ten Eyewitness News), cancer.
- Allan Potts, 79, New Zealand Olympic track and field coach, official and runner, President of Athletics New Zealand (2002–2003), bone cancer.
- Delbert Rice, 86, American missionary.
- Geoff Richards, 85, English footballer (West Brom), pneumonia.
- Jair Rodrigues, 75, Brazilian musician and singer, heart attack.
- Mercedes Salisachs, 97, Spanish writer.
- Malcolm Shaw, 66, New Zealand-born Australian Olympic rower.
- Vladimir Nikolaevich Smirnov, 67, Russian footballer.
- Robert D. Stuart Jr., 98, American food executive and diplomat, CEO of Quaker Oats Company (1966–1981), Ambassador to Norway (1984–1989), heart attack.
- Robert Symms, 83, American photographer.
- Joseph P. Teasdale, 78, American politician, Governor of Missouri (1977–1981), complications from pneumonia.
- Harry Weltman, 81, American basketball executive (Cleveland Cavaliers, New Jersey Nets), complications from Alzheimer's disease.
- Alan Woodman, 58, Australian VFL football player (Geelong).
- Tommie Wright, 95, American pianist and composer (Florida State Seminoles fight song).

=== 9 ===
- Graeme Acton, 63, Australian cattle baron, injuries sustained in campdrafting accident.
- Giacomo Bini, 75, Italian Franciscan priest, Minister General of the Order of Friars Minor (1997–2003).
- Eugen Dombois, 82, German lutenist and music teacher.
- Bob Duynstee, 93, Dutch politician, member of the House of Representatives (1956–1967) and State Secretary for Defence (1967–1971).
- Terry Farmer, 82, English footballer (Rotherham United, York City).
- Flossie Gomile-Chidyaonga, Malawian diplomat involved in leaked diplomatic cable controversy, High Commissioner to Tanzania (since 2011).
- Stephen Hall, 72, American politician.
- Bob Hoysted, 88, Australian racehorse trainer (Manikato, Rose of Kingston, Sydeston).
- Donald Kirkpatrick, 90, American academic and author.
- Harlan Mathews, 87, American politician, US Senator from Tennessee (1993–1994), brain cancer.
- Galindo Mellado Cruz, 41, Mexican drug lord, a founder of Los Zetas, shot.
- Roger Millsap, 59, American psychometrician.
- Jules Mutebutsi, 54, Congolese militant.
- Janaky Athi Nahappan, 89, Malaysian independence fighter, founding member of the MIC, pneumonia.
- Mel Patton, 89, American sprinter, double Olympic champion (1948) and world record holder for 100- and 220-yard dashes.
- N. Janardhana Reddy, 79, Indian politician, AP MLA (1989–1994) and Chief Minister (1990–1992), RS MP (1972–1978, 2009–2014), LS MP (1998–2009), liver disease.
- Selim Sesler, 57, Turkish clarinet player.
- Mary Stewart, 97, British novelist (Merlin series), heart failure.
- Frank Strazzeri, 84, American jazz pianist.
- Donald Tandy, 95, British actor (EastEnders).
- Joe Wilder, 92, American jazz trumpeter, heart failure.
- Jorge Zavala, 91, Ecuadorian politician.

=== 10 ===
- Carmen Alardín, 80, Mexican poet, writer and translator.
- Yeso Amalfi, 88, Brazilian footballer (Olympique de Marseille).
- Carmen Argibay, 74, Argentine judge, member of the Supreme Court (since 2005), heart attack.
- Marie Dean Arrington, 80, American convicted murderer.
- George Behlman, 70, American racing driver, Pulmonary fibrosis.
- Miguel Brascó, 87, Argentine writer.
- Andrés Carrasco, 67, Argentine neurologist, challenged Monsanto over safety of glyphosate.
- Maurice Casey, 71, British scholar.
- Ronnie Caveness, 71, American football player (Arkansas Razorbacks), melanoma.
- José Cestero, 76, Puerto Rican basketball player.
- Brij Bihari Chaubey, 73, Indian academic.
- Gene Chyzowych, 79, Ukrainian-born American soccer player and coach (national team, New York Apollo), cancer.
- Rhoda Dorsey, 86, American historian and college president.
- Jadiel, 28, Puerto Rican singer.
- Lem Johns, 88, American Secret Service agent (Lyndon B. Johnson).
- Mari Kinsigo, 67, Estonian chess player.
- Patrick Lucey, 96, American politician and diplomat, Governor of Wisconsin (1971–1977), Ambassador to Mexico (1977–1979).
- Shigeru Nakayama, 85, Japanese historian.
- Nash the Slash, 66, Canadian rock musician (FM).
- Lane Penn, 74, New Zealand rugby union executive, President of the NZRU (2001–2003).
- Gottlieb Perren, 88, Swiss Olympic skier.
- André Popp, 90, French composer.
- José Falcó Sanmartín, 97, Spanish fighter pilot.
- Patrick Woodroffe, 74, British fantasy, surrealist and record jacket artist, Pick's disease.
- Viktor Yerokhin, 74, Russian football coach and player.

=== 11 ===
- Sidney Blatt, 85, American psychotherapist.
- Ismail Boçari, 96–97, Albanian professor.
- Marcel Bon, 89, French mycologist.
- Yvonne Cartier, 86, New Zealand ballet dancer and instructor.
- Gérard Drainville, 83, Canadian Roman Catholic prelate, Bishop of Amos (1978–2004).
- Thelma Eisen, 92, American baseball player (AAGPBL).
- Corinne Freeman, 87, American politician, Mayor of St. Petersburg, Florida (1977–1985), cancer.
- Ed Gagliardi, 62, American bass guitarist (Foreigner), cancer.
- Reg Gasnier, 74, Australian Hall of Fame rugby league player (St. George Dragons) and national team captain.
- A. C. Golden, 44, American professional wrestler.
- Tarakant Jha, 86, Indian politician.
- Paul Kinsman, 83, Canadian politician, Nova Scotia MLA for West Kings (1963–1967), Kings South (1984).
- Barbara Knudson, 86, American actress (Meet Danny Wilson, The Jayhawkers!, The Cry Baby Killer).
- Kaare Kroppan, 81, Norwegian actor.
- Camille Lepage, 26, French photojournalist.
- Jeb Stuart Magruder, 79, American presidential aide (Richard Nixon), convicted for conspiracy to obstruct justice and wiretapping (Watergate scandal), complications from a stroke.
- Guy Morton Jr., 83, American baseball player (Boston Red Sox).
- Celso Pereira de Almeida, 86, Brazilian Roman Catholic prelate, Bishop of Porto Nacional (1976–1995) and Itumbiara (1995–1998).
- Margareta Pogonat, 81, Romanian actress.
- Sir David Rowlands, 66, British civil servant.
- Francisco Sobrino, 82, Spanish sculptor.
- Martin Špegelj, 86, Croatian politician and army officer, Minister of Defence (1990–1991).
- Harry Stopes-Roe, 90, British philosopher and humanist, Vice President of the British Humanist Association.
- Alan Wills, 52, British record label owner, head injury sustained in bicycle collision.
- Ivan Wingreen, 52, South African-born Australian cricketer, brain tumour.

=== 12 ===
- Babis Angourakis, 63, Greek politician, MP for Athens (1997–2000), MEP for the KKE (since 2009), aneurysm.
- Alan Bestic, 92, Irish journalist.
- Cornell Borchers, 89, Lithuanian-born German actress (The Big Lift, Istanbul).
- Isabel Carrasco, 59, Spanish politician, shot.
- Marco Cé, 88, Italian Roman Catholic cardinal, Patriarch of Venice (1978–2002).
- Petro Chernyaha, 68, Ukrainian scientist and public figure.
- Jacinto Convit, 100, Venezuelan physician, scientist and researcher, developed vaccines against leprosy and leishmaniasis.
- Lynne Cohen, 69, American-born Canadian photographer, lung cancer.
- Terry Cook, 66, Canadian archivist, cancer.
- Keith Crisco, 71, American politician, fall.
- Abdoulaye Djiba, 75, Senegalese Olympic judoka.
- William J.D. Escher, 82, American aerospace engineer.
- Billie Fleming, 100, English long-distance cyclist.
- H. R. Giger, 74, Swiss surrealist artist (Alien), Oscar winner (1980), injuries from a fall.
- Melvin J. Glimcher, 88, American biomedical engineer.
- Svetlana Grigoryan, 83, Armenian actress.
- Tom Hafey, 82, Australian AFL football player (Richmond) and coach (Richmond, Collingwood, Geelong, Sydney), cancer.
- Cornelia Groefsema Kennedy, 90, American judge, 6th Cir. Court of Appeals (1979–1999), member (1970–1979) and Chief Judge (1977–1979) of the US District Court of E. Mich.
- Ineke Lambers-Hacquebard, 68, Dutch politician, cancer.
- Ľudovít Lehen, 88, Slovak painter and chess composer.
- Brian Marchinko, 65, Canadian ice hockey player (Toronto Maple Leafs, New York Islanders).
- Hugh McLeod, 81, Scottish rugby union player.
- Joe Mence, 93, British cricketer (Berkshire).
- Min Huifen, 69, Chinese erhu master and composer, cerebral hemorrhage.
- Daud Mirza, 45, Pakistani-born Norwegian actor.
- Pál Orosz, 80, Hungarian football player and coach, Olympic bronze medalist (1960).
- Ralph Peduto, 72, American actor (The Rock, Mrs. Doubtfire, The Godfather) and playwright, leukemia.
- Ruben T. Profugo, 76, Filipino Roman Catholic prelate, Bishop of Lucena (1982–2003).
- Sarat Pujari, 79, Indian actor, heart attack.
- Leroy Serisier, 86, Australian politician, member of the New South Wales Legislative Council (1970–1978).
- Betty Sherrill, 91, American interior designer.
- Hugh Smyth, 73, Northern Irish politician, Leader of the Progressive Unionist Party (1979–2002), Lord Mayor of Belfast (1994–1995).
- Sudhir, 70, Indian film actor (Satte Pe Satta).
- James Walston, 65, British political scientist, cancer.
- A. J. Watson, 90, American Hall of Fame race car builder and mechanic (Pat Flaherty).
- Lorenzo Zambrano, 70, Mexican building material executive, CEO of Cemex.

=== 13 ===
- Máximo Alcócer, 81, Bolivian footballer.
- David Malet Armstrong, 87, Australian philosopher.
- Martin Barreras, 49, American noncommissioned officer, Army Ranger Sergeant Major in charge of the rescue of Jessica Lynch, wounds sustained in combat.
- John Barritt, 98, British Bermudian politician, BMP for Devonshire South, Speaker (1979–1989).
- Malik Bendjelloul, 36, Swedish documentarian (Searching for Sugar Man), Oscar winner (2013), suicide by train.
- Gilles Cloutier, 85, Canadian physicist, Rector of the Université de Montréal (1985–1993).
- J. F. Coleman, 95, American military and test pilot (Convair XFY Pogo), winner of the Harmon Trophy (1954), natural causes.
- Fred Dunsmore, 84, Canadian ice hockey player (Winnipeg Maroons).
- Mary Lou Harkness, 88, American librarian.
- Hamad Khalaily, 85, Israeli politician, member of the Knesset (1981–1984).
- Ben H. Radcliffe, 98, American politician.
- Miodrag Rakić, 39, Serbian politician.
- Altamiro Rossato, 88, Brazilian Roman Catholic prelate, Bishop of Marabá (1985–1989), Archbishop of Porto Alegre (1991–2001).
- Bob Sessions, 82, American winemaker.
- Mohammad Baqer Shirazi, 82, Iranian Grand Ayatollah.
- Rowena Spencer, 91, American pediatric surgeon.
- Ron Stevens, 64, Canadian politician, Alberta MLA for Calgary-Glenmore (1997–2009).
- Anthony Villanueva, 69, Filipino featherweight boxer, Olympic silver medalist (1964), heart attack.
- Tessa Watts, 68, British music video producer ("Sledgehammer"), pancreatic cancer.
- Morning Glory Zell-Ravenheart, 65, American neopagan, author and priestess (Church of All Worlds), multiple myeloma.

=== 14 ===
- Diane Barz, 70, American judge, first female member of the Montana Supreme Court (1989–1990), cancer.
- Hazel Rodney Blackman, 93, American fashion designer, quilter, and painter.
- Bruce Bowley, 92, Australian cricketer.
- Douglas Cummings, 67, British cellist (London Symphony Orchestra).
- David Dusing, 71, American tenor, conductor, and composer.
- John M. Fitzpatrick, 65, British urologist, subarachnoid haemorrhage.
- Gisela Kessler, 78, German trade unionist.
- Jeffrey Kruger, 83, British music business executive (Flamingo Club, Ember Records).
- Dolores Lee, 79, American baseball player (Rockford Peaches).
- Emanuel Raymond Lewis, 85, American librarian and author.
- Alexander Murray MacBeath, 90, British mathematician.
- Trevor Peck, 75, Welsh footballer (Cardiff City).
- Leonard Quilty, 94, Canadian politician, member of the Legislative Assembly of Ontario (1958–1975).
- Sam W. Russell, 68, American politician, member of the Texas House of Representatives (1983–1992).
- Morvin Simon, 70, New Zealand Māori composer, kapa haka leader and historian.
- Warren Keith Sinclair, 90, New Zealand physicist.
- Martin Skowroneck, 87, German harpsichord builder.
- Stephen Sutton, 19, British charity fundraiser, colorectal cancer.
- Freddie Williams, 58, American football player (Saskatchewan Roughriders).
- Terry Wire, 73, British politician, Mayor of Northampton, cancer.

=== 15 ===
- Charles Angell, 84, American politician.
- George J. Armelagos, 77, American anthropologist, pancreatic cancer.
- Peter Ayerst, 93, British World War II fighter and test pilot (Supermarine Spitfire).
- Terry Bell, 69, English footballer (Reading).
- Hans Breidbach-Bernau, 93, Austrian Olympic writer 1948.
- Robert Burns, 77, Canadian politician, Quebec MNA for Maisonneuve (1970–1979).
- Jean-Luc Dehaene, 73, Belgian politician, Prime Minister (1992–1999), fall.
- M. B. Etheredge, 98, American politician and World War II army officer, awarded Texas Legislative Medal of Honor.
- Robert J. Flynn, 76, American naval officer, Vietnam War POW held in China (1967–1973).
- Greg Hughes, 75, Irish Gaelic football player (Offaly GAA).
- M B Manik, 43, Bangladeshi filmmaker, shot.
- Michael Mence, 70, British cricketer (Berkshire).
- Jan Mucha, 72, Polish speedway motorcycle rider, cancer.
- Susumu Nakayama, 66, Japanese serial killer.
- Jean Oury, 90, French psychiatrist and psychoanalyst, pancreatic cancer.
- I. M. Jayarama Shetty, 63, Indian politician, MP for Udupi (1998–1999).
- Norifumi Suzuki, 80, Japanese film director (Torakku Yarō).
- Ed Swearingen, 88, American aeronautical engineer.
- Carlo Weber, 80, German architect (Auer+Weber+Assoziierte).
- Nahum Zolotov, 88, Israeli architect.
- Robert Zwanzig, 86, American physicist.

=== 16 ===
- Charlie Boney, 89, American architect.
- Benaouda Boudjellal, Algerian footballer.
- Vera Dajht-Kralj, 85, Croatian sculptor.
- Amalendu De, 84–85, Indian historian.
- Dehere, 23, American Thoroughbred racehorse.
- Chris Duckworth, 81, South African cricketer.
- Vito Favero, 81, Italian road racing cyclist.
- Allan Folsom, 72, American novelist (The Day After Tomorrow), metastatic melanoma.
- Nicola Ghiuselev, 77, Bulgarian operatic bass.
- Sandy Gilliam, 81, American football and baseball coach.
- Bud Hollowell, 71, American baseball player and manager.
- Zil-e-Huma, 70, Pakistani singer, renal disease and diabetes.
- Oleksiy Korobeinikov, 36, Ukrainian Olympic biathlete.
- Russi Mody, 96, Indian steel and airline executive, President of Tata Steel, Indian Airlines and Air India, recipient of the Padma Bhushan (1989).
- Aleksandr Shumeyko, Kyrgyzstani Soviet football manager.
- Clyde Snow, 86, American forensic anthropologist, cancer and emphysema.
- Viktor Sukhodrev, 81, Soviet-born Russian interpreter (Nikita Khrushchev, Leonid Brezhnev).
- Ruth Tarvydas, 66–67, Australian fashion designer, fall.
- Louise Wilson, 52, British fashion academic (Central Saint Martins).

=== 17 ===
- Catherine M. Abate, 66, American politician, member of the New York Senate (1994–1998), uterine cancer.
- David Abbott, 76, British advertising executive and copywriter.
- Ursula Benedix, 91, German politician.
- Jack Burke Jr., 82, American politician.
- Olivier Chesneau, 42, French astronomer.
- Gerald Edelman, 84, American biologist, Nobel Prize laureate (1972), natural causes.
- Hussein el-Imam, 63, Egyptian actor and musician.
- Clarence Ellis, 71, American computer scientist.
- John Gardiner, 71, Australian Olympic basketball player.
- Jerry Henderson, 72, American basketball coach.
- Matt Kailey, 59, American author and transgender activist, heart failure.
- Jerrold E. Lomax, 87, American architect.
- Hiram Mann, 92, American military officer and pilot, Army Lt. Col. for the Tuskegee Airmen 332nd Fighter Group.
- Bongani Masuku, 50, South African singer (Johnny Clegg), shot.
- Miss Beazley, 9, American-born Scottish terrier, co-First Dog (2005–2009), euthanized due to lymphoma.
- C. P. Krishnan Nair, 92, Indian hotelier, founder and chairman of The Leela Palaces, Hotels and Resorts, recipient of the Padma Bhushan (2010).
- Paul Victor Obeng, 66, Ghanaian economic advisor, asthma.
- Bob Odom, 78, American politician and power broker.
- Anna Pollatou, 30, Greek rhythmic gymnast, Olympic bronze medalist (2000), traffic collision.
- Notable Laotian people killed in the Lao People's Liberation Army Air Force An-74 crash:
  - Soukanh Mahalath, 59, Governor of Vientiane, Minister of Finance (2001–2006), Governor of the Bank of the Lao P.D.R. (1999–2001).
  - Douangchay Phichit, 70, Deputy Prime Minister, Minister of Defense (since 2001).
  - Thongbanh Sengaphone, 61, Minister of Public Security (since 2005).
  - Cheuang Sombounkhanh, Secretariat of the Central Party Committee, Governor of the Bank of the Lao P.D.R. (1997–1999).

=== 18 ===
- Per Almar Aas, 84, Norwegian politician.
- Lykourgos Angelopoulos, 73, Greek cantor (Greek Byzantine Choir).
- Arizal, 71, Indonesian director.
- Roland Ayers, 81, American painter.
- General Baker, 72, American labor unionist and politician.
- Dobrica Ćosić, 92, Serbian writer and politician, President of the Federal Republic of Yugoslavia (1992–1993).
- Hans-Peter Dürr, 84, German physicist.
- Michel Feron, 91, Belgian Olympic alpine skier.
- Radu Florescu, 88, Romanian-born French historian, complications from pneumonia.
- André Goursolle, 82, French Olympic rower.
- Hussein Isaac, Syrian Major General.
- Kaiketsu Masateru, 66, Japanese sumo wrestler (Ozeki) and executive, Chairman of the Japan Sumo Association (2010–2012), ischemic heart disease.
- A. Malarmannan, 77, Indian politician.
- Don Meyer, 69, American basketball coach (Hamline Pipers, Lipscomb Bisons, Northern State Wolves), carcinoid cancer.
- Chukwuedu Nwokolo, 93, Nigerian doctor and medical researcher.
- Wubbo Ockels, 68, Dutch physicist and astronaut, first Dutch citizen in space, renal cell cancer.
- Francis T. Purcell, 95, American politician, member of the New York Assembly (1964–1965).
- Claude Lavoie Richer, 84, Canadian Olympic cross country skier (1952).
- Per Rollum, 85, Norwegian Olympic alpine skier (1952).
- Jerry Vale, 83, American singer ("Have You Looked into Your Heart", "The Star-Spangled Banner") and actor.
- Morris Weiss, 98, American cartoonist (Mickey Finn).
- Gordon Willis, 82, American cinematographer (The Godfather, Annie Hall, Manhattan), cancer.

=== 19 ===
- Michael Aldrich, 72, British inventor.
- Simon Andrews, 31, British motorcycle racer, head injuries sustained in a race collision.
- Sir Jack Brabham, 88, Australian racing driver, triple Formula One world champion (1959, 1960, 1966).
- Elombe Brath, 77, American activist.
- Peter Buchanan, 70, Australian judge.
- Count Suckle, 82, Jamaican-born British sound system operator and club owner, heart attack.
- Peter Curtin, 70, Australian actor.
- Franz-Paul Decker, 90, German-born Canadian conductor (Montreal Symphony Orchestra, Cologne Opera).
- Rabah Khaloufi, 71, French Olympic boxer.
- Eurico Dias Nogueira, 91, Portuguese Roman Catholic prelate, Archbishop of Braga (1977–1999).
- Sam Greenlee, 83, American writer and filmmaker (The Spook Who Sat by the Door), natural causes.
- Vincent Harding, 82, American civil rights activist and speechwriter (Martin Luther King, Jr.), complications from a heart aneurysm.
- April Jace, 40, American athlete, shot.
- Sante Kimes, 79, American murderer.
- Gabriel Kolko, 81, American historian and author, passive euthanasia.
- Biff Manard, 71, American actor (The Flash, Trancers, Bonanza).
- Mario Missiroli, 80, Italian director.
- Zbigniew Pietrzykowski, 79, Polish boxer, Olympic silver (1960) and bronze medalist (1956, 1964).
- Christine Quinn-Brintnall, 62, American judge, member (2000–2014) and Chief Judge (2012–2013) of the Washington Court of Appeals, melanoma.
- Shekar, 48, Indian cartoonist.
- Antanas Šurna, 75, Lithuanian actor.
- Nima Varasteh, 35, Iranian Musician.

=== 20 ===
- Sandra Bem, 69, American psychologist, suicide by drug overdose.
- Ross Brown, 79, New Zealand rugby union player (Taranaki, national team).
- William Edgar Cohen, 72, American director.
- Robyn Denny, 83, British artist.
- Tadeusz Dominik, 86, Polish artist.
- Chhanda Gayen, 34, Indian mountain climber, avalanche.
- Arthur Gelb, 90, American newspaper editor and critic (The New York Times), complications from a stroke.
- Jim Gulley, 75, American politician, member of the North Carolina House of Representatives (1996–2010).
- Herbert Klausmeier, 98, American educational psychologist.
- Prince Rupert Loewenstein, 80, British-German financial adviser (The Rolling Stones), Bavarian aristocrat.
- Barbara Murray, 84, English actress (Passport to Pimlico, The Plane Makers), heart attack.
- Rupert Pate, 96, American football player (Chicago Cardinals, Philadelphia Eagles).
- Charles W. Robinson, 94, American businessman and diplomat, Deputy Secretary of State (1976–1977).
- Phil Sharpe, 77, English cricketer (Yorkshire, national team).
- Peter Woon, 82, British journalist, heart failure.

=== 21 ===
- Poni Adams, 95, American actress (House of Dracula, Batman and Robin).
- Tunku Annuar, 74, Malaysian royal, heart attack.
- Samuel A. Beatty, 91, American judge, member of the Alabama Supreme Court.
- Mehroo Bengalee, 84, Indian academic.
- Bi Hao, 86–87, Chinese military commander.
- Paul-Émile Charbonneau, 92, Canadian Roman Catholic prelate, Bishop of Hull (1963–1973).
- Duncan Cole, 55, English-born New Zealand footballer (national team).
- Penny Dunbabin, 55, Australian field hockey player.
- Johnny Gray, 87, American baseball player (Philadelphia Athletics/Kansas City Athletics).
- Mack Herewini, 74, New Zealand rugby union player (Auckland, New Zealand Māori, All Blacks).
- Susan J. Herlin, 74, American academic and Dagbon royal.
- James Jones, 87, American politician, member of the South Dakota House of Representatives (1987–1988).
- Abbas Kamandi, 62, Iranian Kurdish singer.
- Karl-Hans Kern, 81, German politician.
- Harmon Elwood Kirby, 80, American diplomat, Ambassador to Togo (1990–1994).
- Ray Kunze, 86, American mathematician.
- João Filgueiras Lima, 82, Brazilian architect, prostate cancer.
- Jaime Lusinchi, 89, Venezuelan politician, President (1984–1989).
- Hélène Pastor, 76–77, Monégasque heiress and businesswoman, injuries sustained in a shooting.
- Alireza Soleimani, 58, Iranian Olympic freestyle wrestler (1992), world champion (1989), heart attack.
- Than Nyein, 76, Burmese politician, founded the National Democratic Force, liver cancer.
- R. Umanath, 92, Indian politician and political leader (CPI(M)), MP for Pudukottai (1962–1971), Tamil Nadu MLA for Nagapattinam (1977–1984).
- Ruth Ziolkowski, 87, American museum executive, CEO of the Crazy Horse Memorial (since 1982), cancer.

=== 22 ===
- Farid Akasheh, 93, Jordanian politician, Minister of Social Development and Labour (1967), Minister of Health (1972–1973).
- Leonardo Andam, 55, Filipino pool player, motorcycle accident.
- Vyacheslav Artashin, 42, Russian rugby league footballer.
- Ted Blanchard, 84, Canadian politician.
- Sergio Bustamante, 79, Mexican actor, heart attack.
- Bobby Clark, American singer.
- Matthew Cowles, 69, American actor and playwright (All My Children, Shutter Island, Oz).
- Edward Howel Francis, 89, British geologist.
- Imre Gedővári, 62, Hungarian fencer, Olympic champion (1988) and bronze medalist (1980).
- Alicia Ghiragossian, 77, Argentine poet and translator.
- Laurie Hill, 71, Australian VFL football player (Collingwood).
- Donald Levine, 86, American toy executive, developer of the first action figure and G. I. Joe, cancer.
- Wes Lofts, 71, Australian VFL football player and administrator (Carlton), emphysema.
- Gordon Swann, 82, American geologist.
- Dragoljub Velimirović, 72, Serbian chess grandmaster.
- Paolo Viganò, 64, Italian footballer.
- Saleh Wreikat, 74, Jordanian politician, MP for Amman's fifth district.

=== 23 ===
- Ranjith Abeysuriya, 82, Sri Lankan lawyer.
- Mikhail Alekseev, 64, Russian linguist.
- Joel Camargo, 67, Brazilian footballer (Santos), renal failure.
- Herman Dillon, 82, American Puyallup tribal executive, chairman and tribal leader, heart failure.
- Mona Freeman, 87, American film actress.
- Michael Gottlieb, 69, American film director and screenwriter (Mannequin, A Kid in King Arthur's Court, Mr. Nanny), traffic collision.
- Rolf Hermichen, 95, German Luftwaffe fighter ace, recipient of the Knight's Cross of the Iron Cross with Oak Leaves.
- Richard Kolitsch, 24, German footballer, traffic collision.
- Vivi Krogh, 94, Norwegian political activist.
- Madhav Mantri, 92, Indian cricketer, was oldest-living Indian Test player, heart attack.
- John McCormack, 79, Scottish light middleweight boxer, Olympic bronze medalist (1956) and European middleweight champion (1961-1962).
- Anand Modak, 63, Indian musician and film composer, heart attack.
- Gerald O'Leary, 81, American politician.
- Andy Olsen, 83, American baseball umpire.
- Nikolai Pastukhov, 91, Russian actor.
- Panagiotis Poikilidis, 49, Greek Olympic wrestler (1984, 1992, 1996), stroke as a complication of an aortic aneurysm.
- Uña Ramos, 80, Argentine musician.
- Ramón Reyes, 76, Panamanian Olympic basketball player.
- Elliot Rodger, 22, English-American mass murderer (2014 Isla Vista killings), suicide by gunshot.
- Walter Romberg, 85, East German politician, Minister of Finance (1990).
- Hugh Roy, 78, South African cricketer.
- John Satterthwaite, 88, English Anglican prelate, Bishop of Gibraltar (1970–1993).
- Ernst Strupler, 95, Swiss Olympic diver.
- Judith Young, 61, American physicist and astronomer, complications from multiple myeloma.

=== 24 ===
- Joe Aitcheson Jr., 85, American steeplechase jockey.
- Tariq Aziz Brisam, 68, Iraqi football player.
- Lakshmi Kumari Chundawat, 97, Indian author and politician, MP (1972–1978) and Rajasthan MLA (1962–1971) for Devgarh, recipient of Padma Shri (1984), lung infection.
- Stormé DeLarverie, 93, American LGBT activist, involved in the Stonewall Riots, dementia.
- Arthur Getagazhev, 38, Russian Ingush militant leader, shot.
- Billy Glide, 43, American pornographic actor, alcohol intoxication.
- Klaus Herm, 89, German actor.
- Mahafarid Amir Khosravi, 45, Iranian billionaire industrialist, convicted of embezzlement, execution by hanging.
- Maurizio Mannelli, 84, Italian Olympic water polo player (1952).
- Andrei Mironov, 60, Russian journalist and human rights activist, mortar attack.
- Steve Moore, 59, American comedian.
- Knowlton Nash, 86, Canadian journalist, author and news anchor (The National).
- Nitya Pibulsonggram, 72, Thai diplomat, Foreign Minister (2006–2008), Ambassador to the United States (1984–2000) and United Nations, stroke.
- Andrea Rocchelli, 30, Italian photojournalist, mortar attack.
- Conrad Rochat, 86, Swiss Olympic ski jumper.
- Mark Selbee, 45, American kickboxer, drowning.
- Freydis Sharland, 93, British pilot.
- Roger Stanley, 71, American politician and informant, member of the Illinois House of Representatives (1977–1982), informant in George Ryan corruption case.
- E. Don Taylor, 76, Jamaican Anglican prelate, Bishop of the Virgin Islands (1986–1994), Vicar of New York City (1994–2009), heart disease.
- John Vasconcellos, 82, American politician, member of the California State Assembly (1966–1996) and Senate (1996–2004), organ failure.

=== 25 ===
- David Allen, 78, English cricketer (Gloucestershire, national team).
- Lila Ramkumar Bhargava, 92, Indian freedom fighter, social worker, and educationist.
- Tommy Blom, 67, Swedish radio host and singer (Tages).
- Lee Chamberlin, 76, American actress (The Electric Company, All My Children), cancer.
- John Cole, 81, South African cricketer.
- Marcel Côté, 71, Canadian economist and politician.
- Raymond Crisara, 93, American trumpeter.
- Peter Dunfield, 82, Canadian figure skater and Olympic coach (Elizabeth Manley).
- Bertha Gilkey, 65, American community activist, cancer.
- Wojciech Jaruzelski, 90, Polish military officer and politician, Prime Minister (1981–1985), Chairman of the Council of State (1985–1989), President (1989–1990).
- Herb Jeffries, 100, American actor and jazz and traditional pop singer, heart failure.
- Sir Toaripi Lauti, 85, Tuvaluan politician, Prime Minister of Tuvalu (1978–1981), Governor-General of Tuvalu (1990–1993).
- John Maginnis, 66, American political writer, commentator and journalist.
- Elmer Osmar Ramón Miani, 81, Argentinian Roman Catholic prelate, Bishop of Catamarca (1989–2007).
- Berniece Baker Miracle, 94, American writer.
- Matthew Saad Muhammad, 59, American Hall of Fame light heavyweight boxer, WBC champion (1979–1980), amyotrophic lateral sclerosis.
- Jhonny Perozo, 29, Venezuelan footballer, shot.
- Sir Robert Porter, 90, Northern Irish politician, Minister of Home Affairs and Health and Social Services (1969), MP (NI) for Queen's University of Belfast (1966–1969) and Lagan Valley (1969–1973).
- Washington César Santos, 54, Brazilian footballer (national team), amyotrophic lateral sclerosis.
- Malcolm Simmons, 68, British motorcycle speedway racer (Poole Pirates), World Team Cup Winner (1974, 1975, 1977), World Pairs Champion (1976, 1977, 1978), emphysema.
- Tom Smith, 87, American politician.
- Robert Steinberg, 92, American mathematician.
- Tang Yuhan, 101, Hong Kong oncologist.
- Bunny Yeager, 85, American model and photographer, heart failure.

=== 26 ===
- Albert Attalla, 82, American nuclear physicist.
- Tommy Baxter, 84, New Zealand rugby league footballer.
- Anna Berger, 91, American actress (Ghost World, The Sopranos, You Don't Mess with the Zohan).
- Francesco d'Avalos, 84, Italian conductor and composer.
- Baselios Marthoma Didymos I, 92, Indian Orthodox Church hierarch, Catholicos of The East and Malankara Metropolitan (2005–2010).
- Roland Dille, 89, American educator, President of Minn. St. Moorhead (1968–1994).
- Arthur E. Drumm, 84, American inventor, environmentalist, and military subcontractor.
- Mike Gordon, 60, American baseball player (Chicago Cubs), acute myeloid leukemia.
- Sir John Gorman, 91, Northern Irish politician, MLA for North Down (1998–2003).
- Princess Jin Moyu, 95, Chinese Manchurian royal (Qing dynasty).
- Frances Kornbluth, 93, American painter.
- Robert L. Letsinger, 92, American biochemist.
- Ma Man-kei, 94, Chinese Macanese politician.
- Marcial Mes, 64, Belizean politician, first Mayan appointed to cabinet, member of the House of Representatives for Toledo West, traffic collision.
- William R. Roy, 88, American politician and physician, member of the U.S. House of Reps for Kansas's 2nd District (1971–1975), complications following heart surgery.
- Hooshang Seyhoun, 93, Iranian architect.
- Manuel Uribe, 48, Mexican obese man, was world's third-heaviest person, liver failure.
- Trevor C. Weekes, 74, Irish-born American astronomer.
- Westmead Hawk, 10–11, English Greyhound, winner of the English Greyhound Derby (2005, 2006).
- Peter Williams, 56, South African cricketer.
- Shinichi Yamaji, 50, Japanese racing car driver.
- Yu Chen Yueh-ying, 87, Taiwanese politician and judge, MP for Kaohsiung (1982–1985).

=== 27 ===
- Dagfinn Aarskog, 85, Norwegian physician.
- Shehu Abubakar, 76, Nigerian chieftain, Emir of Gombe (since 1984).
- Giancarlo Bacci, 82, Italian footballer.
- Harold Baer Jr., 81, American judge, S.D.N.Y. federal judge (since 1994), New York Supreme Court justice (1982–1992), internal bleeding after a fall.
- Kevin Bourke, 92, Australian rugby union player.
- Aurora Bretón, 65, Mexican Olympic archer (1972, 1984, 1988, 1992) and executive, President of the Mexican Archery Federation.
- Alan Callan, 67, British businessman, record producer and music executive.
- Roy Clyde Clark, 93, American bishop.
- Hugh Austin Curtis, 81, Canadian politician, British Columbia MLA for Saanich and the Islands (1972–1986), cancer.
- Dejan Drakul, 26, Bosnian-Herzegovinian football player, cancer.
- Andor Elbert, 79, Canadian canoeist.
- Ruth Flowers, 74, British disc jockey.
- Robert Genn, 78, Canadian landscape artist.
- Jack Joyce, 71, American business executive (Nike, Inc.), co-founder of Rogue Ales.
- Kōji Kojima, 83, Japanese Olympic volleyball coach (1972), pneumonia.
- Lochsong, 26, British thoroughbred sprinter racehorse, Horse of the Year (1993), Champion Sprinter (1993, 1994), colic.
- Malcolm MacDonald, 66, Scottish music critic.
- Mosoeu Magalefa, 65, South African navy officer, Chief of Naval Staff (2005–2009).
- Miodrag Radulovacki, 81, Serbian medical research scientist.
- Alf Ramsøy, 88, Norwegian long-distance runner, cross-country skier and actor.
- Helma Sanders-Brahms, 73, German film director (Germany, Pale Mother).
- Sigmund Kvaløy Setreng, 79, Norwegian philosopher.
- Janice Scroggins, 58, American jazz pianist.
- Charles Swithinbank, 87, British glaciologist.
- Roberto Vargas, 84, American Puerto Rican baseball player (Milwaukee Braves).
- Massimo Vignelli, 83, Italian graphic designer (New York City Subway map, American Airlines).

=== 28 ===
- Maurice Agulhon, 87, French historian.
- Maya Angelou, 86, American author (I Know Why the Caged Bird Sings), poet ("On the Pulse of Morning") and civil rights activist.
- Fauzi Ayub, 47, Lebanese-Canadian militant (Hezbollah), FBI most wanted terrorist. (death announced on this date)
- Azlan Shah of Perak, 86, Malaysian royal, Yang di-Pertuan Agong (1989–1994), Sultan of Perak (since 1984), Lord President of the Supreme Court (1982–1984), Chief Justice (1979–1982).
- Pierre Bernard, 81, French footballer.
- Rachel Berman, 68, American-born Canadian painter.
- Bert A. Betts, 90, American politician.
- Stan Crowther, 78, English footballer.
- Hernán Cruz Barnica, Honduran journalist, shot.
- Ciro de Quadros, 74, Brazilian physician, cancer.
- Christine Daure-Serfaty, 87, French human rights activist and writer.
- Oscar Dystel, 101, American book publishing executive (Bantam Books), pioneered mass marketing of paperbacks.
- Malcolm Glazer, 85, American real estate executive (First Allied Corporation) and sports franchise owner (Manchester United, Tampa Bay Buccaneers).
- Clara W. Hall, 83, American research chemist.
- Dave Herman, 78, American radio personality (WNEW-FM), aneurysm.
- Bob Houbregs, 82, Canadian Hall of Fame basketball player (University of Washington, Milwaukee Hawks, Detroit Pistons).
- Ertuğrul Işınbark, 73, Turkish stage magician.
- Isaac Kungwane, 43, South African football player (Kaizer Chiefs, national team) and commentator (SuperSport), complications from diabetes.
- David Nadien, 88, American violinist.
- Fazlollah Nikkhah, 83, Iranian Olympic boxer.
- Wyc Orr, 67, American politician, member of the Georgia House of Representatives (1988–1992).
- Lawrence Paul, 79, Canadian Mi'kmaq politician, Chief and Chairman of Millbrook First Nation (1984–2012).
- Jāzeps Pīgoznis, 79, Latvian landscape artist and academic, recipient of the Order of the Three Stars (2011).
- Mordechai Piron, 92, Austrian-born Israeli chief military rabbi (Israel Defense Forces, 1969–1980).
- James K. Randall, 84, American composer.
- Jimmy Saxton, 74, American Hall of Fame football player (Texas Longhorns), dementia.
- Peter Van de Wetering, 82, Dutch-born American horticulturist (Park Avenue, United Nations Plaza).

=== 29 ===
- Bern Bennett, 92, American radio and television announcer.
- Karlheinz Böhm, 86, Austrian actor (Peeping Tom, The Wonderful World of the Brothers Grimm).
- Christine Charbonneau, 70, Canadian singer and songwriter.
- Walter Jakob Gehring, 75, Swiss developmental biologist.
- Peter Glaser, 90, Czech-born American scientist and aerospace engineer.
- Maxine Greene, 96, American educational philosopher.
- Stefans Grové, 91, South African composer.
- Alfred Jaretzki III, 94, American surgeon and academic.
- Serhii Kulchytskyi, 50, Ukrainian National Guard major general, shot down.
- Rafael Mendiluce, 74, Spanish footballer.
- Grigori Mints, 74, Russian philosopher and mathematician.
- Ian Norman, 75, Australian businessman and retail executive, co-founder of Harvey Norman.
- Miljenko Prohaska, 88, Croatian composer.
- Herman W. Rattliff, 88, American politician.
- William M. Roth, 97, American shipping executive (Matson, Inc.), conservationist (Ghirardelli Square) and diplomat, U.S. Trade Representative (1967–1969).
- Ken Schram, 66, American television (KOMO-TV) and radio journalist (KOMO-AM), infection.
- Tito Torbellino, 33, American banda singer and musician, shot.
- Willem van Asselt, 68, Dutch theologian, complications from a stroke.
- Felisa Vanoff, 89, American dancer, choreographer, and theatrical producer, cancer.

=== 30 ===
- Don Barry, 82, Canadian football player (Edmonton Eskimos).
- Brian Blackburn, 85, Australian Olympic gymnast.
- Hienadz Buraukin, 77, Belarusian poet, journalist and diplomat, Ambassador to the United Nations (1990–1994), cancer.
- Henning Carlsen, 86, Danish Bodil Award-winning film director (Hunger, People Meet and Sweet Music Fills the Heart).
- Robert Costello, 93, American TV and film producer, writer, and director.
- Richard Dürr, 75, Swiss footballer (Lausanne Sports).
- Tod Ensign, American military veterans' rights lawyer.
- Peter Hall, 86, New Zealand cricketer.
- Jacques-André Hochart, 65, French cyclist.
- Ron Kleemann, 76, American photorealist painter.
- Joan Lorring, 88, British Hong Kong-born American actress (The Corn Is Green, Three Strangers).
- Lyudmila Makarova, 92, Soviet-born Russian actress, People's Artist of the USSR (1977).
- Hanna Maron, 90, German-born Israeli actress, recipient of the Israel Prize (1973).
- Brad Mooney, 83, American rear admiral, Chief of Naval Research (1983–1987).
- Satao, 45–46, Kenyan African elephant, poisoned arrow.
- Michael Szameit, 64, German science fiction writer.
- Idrissa Timta, 71–72, Nigerian chieftain, Emir of Gwoza (since 1981), shot.
- Leonidas Vasilikopoulos, 82, Greek naval officer, Admiral and Chief of the Hellenic Navy General Staff (1986–1989) and the National Intelligence Service (1993–1996).

=== 31 ===
- Mary Anthony, 97, American choreographer, modern dancer and dance teacher (Arthur Mitchell, Donald McKayle).
- Marilyn Beck, 85, American syndicated entertainment journalist and columnist, lung cancer.
- Jiří Bruder, 86, Czech actor.
- Jack Casley, 88, English football player (Torquay, Headington) and scout.
- Marinho Chagas, 62, Brazilian footballer (Botafogo, national team), gastrointestinal bleeding.
- Jack Dittmer, 86, American baseball player (Boston Braves/Milwaukee Braves).
- Joseph Dowling, 92, Irish politician.
- Hoss Ellington, 79, American race car driver and team owner (NASCAR), cancer.
- Esyllt Harker, 67, Welsh singer and actress, cancer.
- Martha Hyer, 89, American actress (Some Came Running, Sabrina).
- Lewis Katz, 72, American media (The Philadelphia Inquirer, Philadelphia Daily News, YES Network) and sport franchise owner (New Jersey Nets and Devils), plane crash.
- Michael Kay, 86, American historian.
- Chuck Lumsden, 81, Canadian football player (Winnipeg Blue Bombers).
- Maitland Mackie, 76, Scottish farmer and academic administrator.
- Pat McDonagh, 80, British-born Canadian fashion designer, cancer.
- Brajanath Ratha, 78, Indian Oriya poet.
- Margaret Rodgers, 75, Australian deaconess.
- Jon Sandsmark, 72, Norwegian textile artist.
- Steven H. Scheuer, 88, American film and television historian and critic, heart failure.
- Mary Soames, Baroness Soames, 91, British aristocrat.
- Sir Godfrey Taylor, 88, British local government leader.
- Max Wehrli, 84, Swiss Olympic decathlete.
- Leslie Zines, 83, Australian legal scholar.
