= Delahaie =

Delahaie is a French surname. Notable people with the surname include:

- Agnès Delahaie (1920–2003), French film producer
- Felix Delahaie (1767–1829), French gardener
- Georges Delahaie (1933–2014), French sculptor

== See also ==
- Delahaye (surname)
