= Akasheh =

Akasheh is a surname. Notable people with the surname include:

- Abolfazl Akasheh (born 1999), Iranian footballer
- Bahram Akasheh (1936–2025), Iranian geophysicist and seismologist
- Farid Akasheh (1921–2014), Jordanian politician
