= Delbert Rice (missionary) =

American missionary and activist

- Born: January 24, 1928; Corvallis, Oregon
- Died: May 8, 2014 (aged 86); Santa Fe, Nueva Vizcaya
- Education: Oregon State College

Arthur Delbert Rice, Jr. (January 24, 1928 – May 8, 2014) was an American missionary, anthropologist, and environmental activist. He is best known for his environmental and human rights advocacy work with the Ikalahan community in Nueva Vizcaya, Philippines.

Rice co-founded the Philippine Association for Intercultural Development and the Kalahan Educational Foundation in Santa Fe, Nueva Vizcaya, and formerly served as chair of the Philippine Council for Sustainable Development.

== Biography ==
=== Early life and education ===
Born January 24, 1928 in Corvallis, Oregon, Delbert was the first child of Arthur Delbert Rice, Sr. and Linne Opal Shipley. His parents come from a German Evangelical Lutheran background. Rice is a ninth generation descendant of German theologian Anthony Jacob Henckel.

Rice and his family moved to San Diego, California in 1940 after his father accepted a new job handling supplies for the United States Navy. During World War II, the Rice family again moved to Liberty Lake, Washington after his father was reassigned to the Navy Supply Depot (now Industrial Park) in Spokane Valley. Rice graduated from Central Valley High School in absentia after enlisting for the United States Coast Guard at age 17.

In 1946, Rice went to Oregon State College where he majored in electrical engineering. While in college, Rice joined the Inter-Varsity Christian Fellowship in his first year which inspired him to pursue a Bachelor of Divinity degree and serve as an engineer and missionary in China.

After graduating as an electrical engineer in 1950, Rice married fellow student Esther Rhoda Bernham, the daughter of Christian missionaries in China who were killed during the war in 1940. Rice then joined the Western Evangelical Seminary to work on his divinity degree, while Esther worked as an office clerk and high school teacher to support themselves. Rice graduated from the seminary in 1955, and accepted a call to work as a missionary in the Philippines. By then Esther had already given birth to their first son Harold in 1953 and their second son Alfred in 1955.

=== Move to the Philippines and environmental activism ===
Delbert, Esther and their two children boarded a ship in Seattle bound for Manila on March 16, 1956. While on the ship, Rice was informed that he will be working with the United Church of Christ in the Philippines, temporarily assigned to Laoag, the capital of Ilocos Norte to learn the Ilocano language. Later he was reassigned to the town of Alicia, Isabela, where they had two more sons.

In 1965, Rice and his family moved from Alicia to the indigenous mountain community of Imugan in Santa Fe, Nueva Vizcaya, where he since resided permanently. Rice witnessed the struggles of the local Ikalahan community, including legal battles, from several attempts by wealthy land developers and even government officials to seize portions of their ancestral land.

In 1970, the national government of the Philippines planned to convert 6,300 hectares of ancestral lands into a vacation destination to be known as "Marcos City", named after then President, Ferdinand Marcos. With the support of Rice, the local community filed a legal case to force the government to recognize their ancestral land claims, which resulted in a legal victory in 1972 forcing the government to abandon its plans to develop the area.

The legal victory also resulted in the issuance of Memorandum of Agreement (MOA) No. 1 between the former Bureau of Forest Development and the Ikalahan people, which legitimized the claims of the Ikalahan to the ancestral lands, established the Kalahan Forest Reserve, and provided them with control and authority in land and natural resource management. In turn, the Ikalahan were given the responsibility of protecting the watershed.

Rice co-founded the Philippine Association for Intercultural Development. Along with Ikalahan tribal elders, Rice co-established the Kalahan Educational Foundation (KEF), a people's organization composed of the total population of Imugan. He also served as a founding board member of the Non-Timber Forest Products – Exchange Programme and chair of the civil society counterpart of the government-sanctioned Philippine Council for Sustainable Development.

Rice also spearheaded the Ikalahan community's venture into fruit-processing with the help of Esther, who was a food technologist. Through the KEF, the community started processing products in 1980 from guava, dagwey (Saurauia subglabra), dikay (Embelia philippinensis), ginger, passion fruit, roselle and santol. Rice also facilitated the marketing and importation of the products to Metro Manila and in other countries.

According to lawyer and environmentalist Tony La Viña, Rice faced as many as three dozen cases for his deportation filed by "vested interests" in large projects that Rice campaigned against such as golf courses and mining operations. None of the cases ever prospered.

== Personal life ==
Rice died on May 8, 2014 in Imugan, Santa Fe, Nueva Vizcaya. He was survived by his five children: Harold, Alfred, Eugene, Tim and Flora Joy; and thirteen grandchildren.

== Legacy ==
An earthworm species discovered in the Philippines, Archipheretima ricei, was named after Rice in 2009 in recognition for his work in preserving the forests of the Caraballo Mountains where the specimen was collected.

In September 2014, the Ateneo de Manila University posthumously awarded Rice the Parangal Lingkod Sambayanan (Public Service Award) for his "pioneering efforts in sustainable upland development, agroforestry, land rights protection, education for indigenous peoples and institution building."

The Pastor Rice Small Grants Fund, which provides funding to women-led indigenous community initiatives in Southeast Asia, was named after Rice.

== Published works ==
- Anthropology in Development and Integration: The Kalahan Experience (1977)
- Development and Ethics: The Kalahan Experience (1982)
- An Ecology Manual for Upland Farmers (1993)
- Ecology: Ti Urnos Ti Lubong (1998)
- The Quiet Ones Speak: Testimonies Concerning Christian Beginnings (2001)
- Basic Upland Ecology (2007)
- Life in the Forest: Ikalahan Folk Stories (2011)
- Walking with a Troublemaker (2011)
