= Hugh Roy (cricketer) =

South African cricketer (1935–2014)

Personal information
- Born: 28 September 1935; Newcastle upon Tyne, England
- Died: 23 May 2014 (aged 78); Knysna, South Africa
- Source: ESPNcricinfo, 21 April 2016

Hugh Roy (28 September 1935 – 23 May 2014) was a South African cricketer. He played fourteen first-class matches for Western Province between 1952 and 1957.
