= Susumu Nakayama =

Japanese serial killer (1948–2014)

- Born: January 13, 1948; Shinjuku, Tokyo, Occupied Japan
- Died: May 15, 2014 (aged 66); Osaka Medical Prison, Osaka, Osaka Prefecture, Japan
- Convictions: Murder x3 Theft; Attempted arson
- Penalty: Death (2001); Death; commuted to life imprisonment (1973)

Details
- Victims: 3
- Span of crimes: 1969–1998
- Country: Japan
- States: Kōchi, Osaka
- Date apprehended: For the final time on February 19, 1998

Susumu Nakayama (中山 進, Nakayama Susumu; January 13, 1948 – May 15, 2014) was a Japanese serial killer who killed his girlfriend's estranged husband and the latter's girlfriend in 1998, after being paroled from prison for a previous murder conviction in 1969. For the latter crimes, Nakayama was sentenced to death, but died in prison before the sentence could be carried out.

== Early life and first murder ==
Susumu Nakayama was born on January 13, 1948, in Shinjuku, Tokyo. Little is known about his upbringing, by the time he was a young adult, he had moved to Kōchi and worked an unspecified job. At the time, he was known to hang around with a group of delinquents who, along with himself, were constantly short on cash, prompting them to start committing crimes.

On March 16, 1968, Nakayama conspired with a friend of his to raid a gun shop in Otsu Village, from where they stole a total of four rifles and five airguns amounting to 117,500 yen. After that, he and several others decided to do a bank robbery, which they began planning sometime around January or February 1969. In order to carry it out, Nakayama raided several stores around Kōchi, stealing bullets and gunpowder and even torching one of the buildings down to cover his tracks. He and his accomplices then stole a car, and tested one of the rifles by firing a single shot at a public toilet in Kōchi. Finally, Nakayama attempted to steal a police officer's handgun, later claiming that "one boat of rifles is not enough to rob a bank." In response to the multiple crimes reported in the area, the Kōchi Prefectural Police established a special unit to deal with the incidents.

At around 21:00 on March 15, 1969, Nakayama and two others ambushed a patrolling police officer near the Sagawa Police Station and shot at him with a rifle. Their timing was off, however, and the officer managed to escape unharmed. On the following day, the three men prepared rifles, bullets and machetes and went to Sagawa by car in search of more policemen, but were forced to turn back after they failed to find any. However, Nakayama, who was involved in a traffic accident just before departure and was being demanded to pay 23,000 yen in damages, came up with the idea of robbing a car somewhere near Takamatsu.

Around 22:30, the trio were driving a car along National Route 23 near Kami when they stopped a 36-year-old motorist and threatened him with a .22-caliber rifle. When the man attempted to get help from passers-by, Nakayama fired one shot into his arm in an attempt to intimidate him. However, the man started to scream, prompting Nakayama to attempt to fire a second shot, which failed to discharge. He then fired a third shot which hit the motorist in the head, killing him instantly. The trio decided against stealing anything, and instead, put the victim's body in the car trunk, whereupon they transported it to a vacant lot in Kami, 900 meters away from the crime scene, and abandoned it there.

The man's body was found at around 7:30 the following day, prompting officers from the local Yamada Police Station to form a special unit to investigate the murder. Initially, it was believed that the incident might be related to the recent shootings perpetrated by Norio Nagayama, but an examination of the shell casings ruled out that possibility. It was eventually established that Nakayama and the two accomplices were responsible for this crime, leading to their arrests not long after.

At trial, the prosecutors requested the death penalty for Nakayama, pointing out that '[his] reckless behavior cannot be tolerated'. As a result, he was found guilty on the charges of murder, theft, and attempted arson and subsequently sentenced to death. His accomplices, 23 and 17, respectively, were sentenced to life imprisonment and 15 years imprisonment each.

Nakayama later appealed the sentence to the Takamatsu High Court, which commuted his sentence to life imprisonment on the grounds that the murder was not premeditated and the rash decisions were the result of the defendant's naive personality. In that same ruling, his accomplices' sentences were also reduced to 15 and 12 years, respectively. After this, Nakayama spent approximately 18 years behind bars, mainly in Okayama Prison, from where he occasionally sent money to his victim's family members. He was released on parole in April 1991.

== Release and relationship ==
Having acquired carpentry skills in prison, Nakayama became seriously involved in the construction industry after his release while keeping in touch with his parole officers. At the time, he worked predominantly in the Kantō region, but after January 1995, when he became involved in reconstruction work following the Great Hanshin earthquake, he permanently moved into his brother-in-law's house in Toyonaka, Osaka Prefecture.

In the summer of 1996, Nakayama went to a coffee and snack bar near his brother-in-law's house, where he became acquainted with one of the female employees. Despite technically being married and with three children, the woman was estranged from her husband and started flirting with Nakayama, resulting in the pair beginning to date around November or December of that year. Around January 1997, Nakayama ended his work in the Kantō region and returned to his native Shinjuku, followed only a month later by his girlfriend and her third son, who found a job as a nurse in Adachi. Eventually, Nakayama broke up with another woman he was living with at the time, and sometime in May, he moved in to live with his girlfriend and her son in Adachi.

At the time, the woman was discussing potential divorce proceedings with her husband over the phone, but the man showed no interest in the matter and stalled the negotiations. Nakayama's girlfriend then told him that her husband was not interested in divorcing her, alleging that he had beaten her and dated another woman in the past, causing Nakayama to grow disgusted with him. Around December 28, when the pair were traveling from Nakayama to Kōchi, they stopped by her husband's house in Toyonaka, where she found him sleeping in the same futon as his new girlfriend. When they woke up, the husband's girlfriend (hereinafter referred to as 'B') claimed that the husband (hereinafter referred to as 'A') could not get divorced because his wife did not sign the divorce papers. When questioned about this, A attempted to avoid the question while seemingly expressing interest in rekindling his relationship with his wife. His wife then left the house and returned to Nakayama's car, where she told him what had happened.

Nakayama learned that if his girlfriend divorced her husband, she would have custody over her two older children, which would mean that they would move in with them. In response to this, his brother-in-law suggested that they renovate a house he owned in the city and turn it into a snack bar, which he would hand over to Nakayama. The construction work began on January 7, 1998, and the following February, Nakayama began looking for a new residence to accommodate his girlfriend and her children.

In the meantime, the pair returned to Toyonaka with the youngest son in an attempt to continue negotiations on the divorce, staying overnight at the renovated snack bar. On the following day, Nakayama and his girlfriend went to A's house, but he was not there. They continued searching for him around the city until they found his car parked in a parking lot in front of a pachinko parlor near Shōnai Station. The pair asked the employees whether they had seen A, but the employees claimed that they had not seen him. Later that same evening, Nakayama's girlfriend was driving her car on the highway en route to Tokyo with her third son when A called on her mobile phone. In the conversation, he told her that he missed her and that he had taken out their older sons to a family restaurant, inviting her to join them. She accepted, but when the topic of divorce was brought up again, A was dismissive and indecisive. The talk lead nowhere, and after finishing their meals, the woman returned to Tokyo and explained the situation to Nakayama over the phone and face-to-face later on.

Around January 29, Nakayama's girlfriend received a phone call from her husband, who claimed that he wanted to get back with her and that he intended to break up with his girlfriend. Upon hearing this, she immediately went to Toyonaka to hear his suggestion, whereupon A stated that he would temporarily hand the children over to B while he searched for a new residence to loan, pointing out that he would not accept Nakayama into the house. Upon returning to Tokyo and informing him of this, the relationship between Nakayama and his girlfriend became awkward.

== Double murder ==
Around February 10, Nakayama went to search for A at least twice, skulking around the vicinity of B's residence. Four days later, he rushed back to Adachi and started talking with his girlfriend about breaking up with her, but gave up on the idea when she told him that she wanted to be with him. During this conversation, Nakayama revealed his criminal record to her, and after going to an interview with his parole officer with her, the pair returned to Toyonaka. Infuriated by A's refusal to divorce his wife, Nakayama planned to kill him.

On the early morning of February 16, he gathered several spear-shaped knives from the snack bar and wrapped their handles with either black insulation tape or a towel painted with black ink. Then, with these knives, he got into a truck and staked out a residential area to ambush A, who failed to appear. Nakayama continued to survey the place for three more days until February 19, at around 1:30 in the morning, when he spotted A and B walking down the street. Upon seeing them, Nakayama rushed at A and repeatedly stabbed him in the neck and chest with a sashimi knife. When B started screaming for help, Nakayama proceeded to stab her multiple times with a sashimi knife and another smaller knife, causing her serious injuries.

A was decapitated on the spot, while B was transported to a nearby hospital with one of the knives still stuck in her back, succumbing to her injuries soon afterward. At the time of death, the pair were 37 and 40 years of age, respectively. In the meantime, Nakayama attempted to flee in his truck, but was pursued by local residents and an off-duty police sergeant. He then collided with a minibike in a narrow alleyway, prompting him to abandon the truck and attempt to flee on foot, but was then caught by an off-duty police officer who had rushed to the scene after receiving an emergency call.

== Trial ==
After his arrest, Nakayama was charged with two counts of murder, weapons, and parole violations. On August 7, 2001, his trial began at the Osaka District Court with presiding Justice Makoto Himuro. The Osaka District Public Prosecutor's Office announced that they would seek the death penalty, citing the accused's lack of remorse and callousness.

On November 20, Nakayama was found guilty on all charges and sentenced to death. During the proceedings, he claimed that while he intended to make A suffer, he did not intend to kill him. His claims were rejected by the court, which determined that the depths of the wounds inflicted on the victims, the planned nature of the crime, the fact that it was committed while on parole and the apparent murderous intent contradicted them. Nakayama then attempted to appeal to the Osaka High Court, but the sentence was upheld by Justice Kazuo Hamai on October 27, 2003. His final appeal to the Supreme Court was also dismissed in a similar manner.

== Imprisonment and death ==
After his conviction, Nakayama was placed on death row at the Osaka Detention House to await execution, but continued to petition the courts for a retrial. On June 11, 2013, he was diagnosed with esophageal cancer and transferred to the Osaka Medical Prison in December of that year. He succumbed to the effects of his illness on the night of May 15, 2014.

In an inquiry form dated November 16, 2015, the Osaka Bar Association said that after being transported to the Osaka Medical Prison, the employees presiding over Nakayama failed to provide him with appropriate medication for his cancer. When queried for a reason, the prison administration gave no reply. In response to this, the association issued a statement on March 15, 2018, stating that Nakayama's human rights had been violated and that cancer patients should be given proper treatment, regardless of the severity of their crimes.

== See also ==
- List of serial killers by country
- Capital punishment in Japan
