= Martin Barreras =

American Army NCO (1964–2014)

Martin R. Barreras
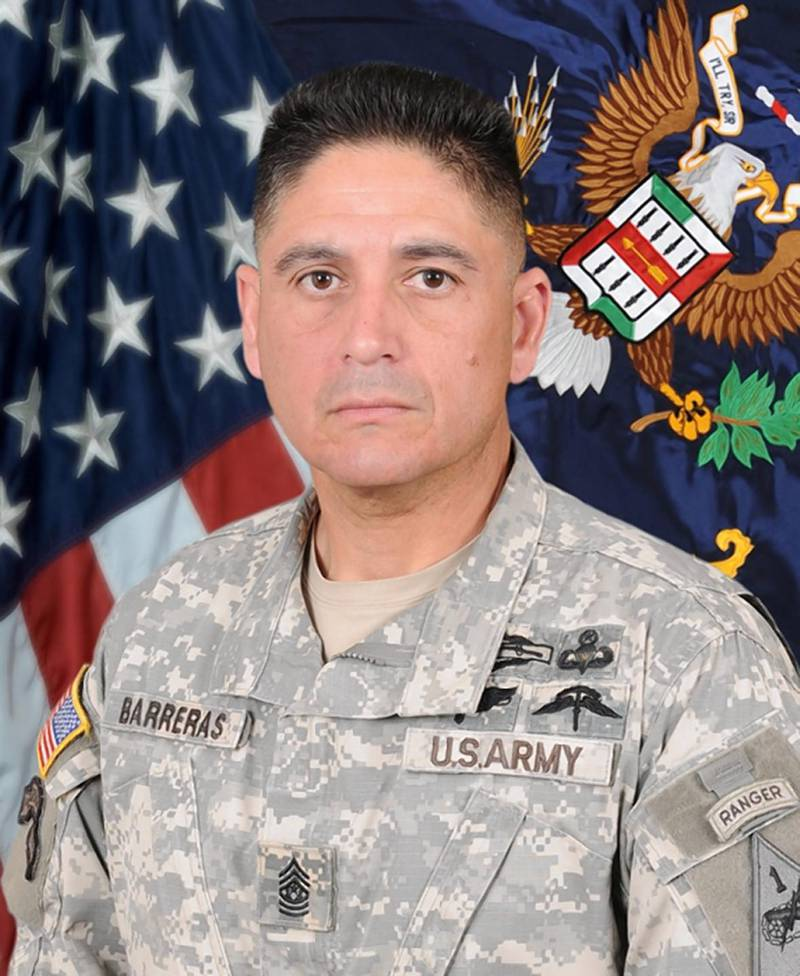
- Born: October 7, 1964; Tularosa, New Mexico, US
- Died: May 13, 2014 (aged 49); Herat Province, Afghanistan
- Burial place: South Lawn Cemetery, Tucson, Arizona
- Spouse: Melinda Barreras
- Children: 3
- Military career
- Allegiance: United States
- Branch: United States Army; United States Marine Corps
- Service years: 1983-2014
- Rank: Command Sergeant Major
- Units: 75th Ranger Regiment; 2nd Bn, 5th Infantry Regiment
- Conflicts: Operation Just Cause; Operation Uphold Democracy; Operation Iraqi Freedom; Operation Enduring Freedom †
- Awards: Legion of Merit; Bronze Star Medal with "V" device Bronze Star Medal with three Oak Leaf Clusters; Purple Heart with one Oak Leaf Cluster; Meritorious Service Medal with two Oak Leaf Clusters; Joint Service Commendation Medal with one Oak Leaf Cluster; Combat Infantryman Badge with one star

Martin Ray "Gunny" Barreras (October 7, 1964 – May 13, 2014) was a US Army Command Sergeant Major who played a crucial role in the rescue of Jessica Lynch in 2003.

== Early life and career ==
Barreras was born in Tularosa, New Mexico, on October 7, 1964. His family moved to Tucson, Arizona, in 1974 where he attended and graduated from Sunnyside High School in 1982. During school he lettered in varsity football, wrestling, choir ensemble, as well as playing on the basketball team.

In 1983, Barreras enlisted in the Marine Corps. After completion of Boot Camp, he was immediately stationed to Camp Lejeune, NC and assigned to 2nd Battalion, 8th Marines as an Infantry machine gunner, henceforth being known as "Gunny." Just a few months after getting to the battalion he would be sifting through the rubble of a terminal in Beirut, Lebanon, recovering 273 of his fellow Marines from the devastation left behind by terrorists who bombed the headquarters. It was during his five years as a Marine that half of his left ring finger was severed, an event about which he was notorious for concocting ever changing, entertaining stories of how it occurred. He kept the remainder of his finger in a jar of formaldehyde, often on his desk.

In 1988, he enlisted in the U.S. Army and successfully passed the Ranger Indoctrination Program (RIP) to serve in the 75th Ranger Regiment's 1st Battalion, 2nd Battalion, was the historic first NCO of Special Troops Battalion, and finally regimental headquarters until 2010. During this period he also acted as the liaison to the CIA in Langley, VA. While with the Ranger regiment, he deployed for Operation Just Cause in Panama, Operation Restore/Uphold Democracy in Haiti, and extensively for Operation Enduring Freedom in Afghanistan and Operation Iraqi Freedom in Iraq. Barreras totaled nearly 60 months deployed since 9/11 at the time of his death.

Barreras played a key role in the rescue of Jessica Lynch in 2003. He also helped recover the bodies of Lynch's fellow soldiers, including Lori Piestewa, from shallow graves in the desert, many digging by hand, to ensure the soldiers' remains were brought back to the US. After leaving the regiment, he served as command sergeant major of the U.S. Army Marksmanship Unit.

Before joining the USAMU, Barreras served a cumulative 49 months deployed overseas. He added to this total as the Sergeant Major of the USAMU where he led the Unit to maintain a persistent presence in Afghanistan, training the Afghan Army and Coalition Forces on Marksmanship skills, a historic first for the battalion.

In March 2013, Barreras transferred to the 2nd Battalion, 5th Infantry Regiment, which was assigned to 3rd Brigade Combat Team, 1st Armored Division in Fort Bliss, Texas. They were deployed to Afghanistan in December 2013. On 6 May 2014, Barreras was severely wounded by enemy small arms fire in Herat Province, Afghanistan. He was transported back to the San Antonio Military Medical Center in the United States where he succumbed to his wounds several days later.

Barreras was mourned by those he served with. Lt. Col. Edward Brady, commander of 2nd Battalion, said, "Command Sgt. Maj. Barreras was my friend and battle buddy. I've spent more time with him than my wife since I've taken command. I believe that I was the luckiest battalion commander in the Army to have him as my command sergeant major...While every soldier in this formation is extremely saddened by his loss, his Bobcats are doing exactly what he would expect of us: continuing on with the mission and taking the fight to the enemy. This man would do absolutely anything and everything to ensure his soldiers came home safely."

Barreras was remembered by General Stanley A. McChrystal as "special [and that] his professional competence, combined with his infectious personality made him a larger-than-life leader to Rangers of every rank" as shared with his family.

His awards include the Legion of Merit, Bronze Star Medal with "V" device, Bronze Star with three oak leaf clusters, Purple Heart with one oak leaf cluster, Meritorious Service Medal with two oak leaf clusters, Joint Service Commendation Medal with one oak leaf cluster, Iraqi Campaign Medal with three stars, Afghanistan Campaign Medal with four stars, Combat Infantryman Badge with one star, Expert Infantryman Badge, Ranger Tab, Master Parachutist Badge with bronze star, Military Freefall Badge, and Pathfinder Badge.

On April 4, 2022, the first academic chair established at the WHINSEC Roy P. Benavidez NCO Academy was named the CSM Martin R. Barreras Academic Leadership Chair in his honor. Retired Colombian Armed Forces Senior Enlisted Advisor, CSM (RET) Argemiro Posso Rivera, was appointed to fill the chair.

== Personal life ==
Barreras was known for his humor as much as his military accomplishments. One story shared with his family by a fellow soldier was during Barreras' extended work in Pakistan working with Pakistani military forces. A night in June 2006 when Admiral Bill McRaven was departing the command for another assignment, they decided to do his Farewell virtually with people video-teleconferencing from locations whenever they were operating. Barreras came in from Islamabad. When the camera went to him, instead of sitting there and saying goodbye to Bill, he was dressed up like President Musharraf, the distinctive President of Pakistan. He proceeded to have "Musharraf" give a tribute and farewell to Bill that was hilarious and made the evening for everyone.

His family shared, "Marty was a soldier's soldier, putting his men first. He refused to sit behind a desk and participated in every patrol and mission, always leading from the front. Marty was extremely humble and the epitome of a "quiet professional." With a contagious laugh and talent for whistling, Marty's sense of humor broke down barriers and kept morale high. Devoted to his family, Marty was cherished at home and by his extended family. Though he rarely had free time, he knew how to spend it. He was an avid rodeo bull rider, marksman, spear fisherman, English Bulldog and Great Dane breeder, classically trained singer, bow hunter, mountain climber, cumbia and western dancer, "rangerball" and rugby player, motorcyclist on his Harleys, and history buff with special interest in warfare and his Mescalero and Jicarilla Apache heritage."

Governor Jan Brewer ordered state flags to be flown at half-mast in recognition of his death.
