= Peter Williams (South African cricketer) =

South African cricketer (1957–2014)

Personal information
- Full name: Peter Howard Williams
- Born: 28 September 1957; Pietermaritzburg, South Africa
- Died: 26 May 2014 (aged 56); Durban, South Africa
- Source: ESPNcricinfo, 20 April 2016

Peter Williams (28 September 1957 – 26 May 2014) was a South African cricketer. He played first-class cricket for Eastern Province and Natal between 1978 and 1989.
