= Ruth Flowers =

British DJ

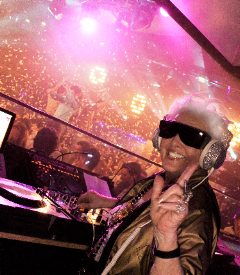
- Ruth Flowers, 28 January 2010

Background information
- Also known as: Mamy Rock
- Born: 29 March 1931; Bristol, England
- Died: 27 May 2014 (aged 83)
- Genres: House, dance
- Occupation(s): DJ, producer
- Years active: 2006–2014
- Labels: spOa
- Website: www.mamyrock.com

Ruth Flowers (29 March 1931 – 27 May 2014), also known as Mamy Rock, was a British DJ and record producer.

== Biography ==
=== Early life ===
Ruth Flowers grew up in a very musically-oriented family. Her father was a tenor, and her brothers were either pianist/violinist/countertenor, bassist, or guitarist and her sister pianist/organist. Ruth's first musical experience was singing.

After several years, a son and a grandson, Ruth and her husband moved to New York City, where they spent many years. After the death of her husband, she returned to England.

Despite working on several interesting photographic projects, she felt there was something missing. Flowers always thought that age was no excuse to give up on things and at 57 she completed the Berlin Marathon.

=== The eye-opening ===
Ruth Flowers helped organise her grandson Franklyn's birthday. Immediately seduced by the lively and energetic atmosphere reminiscent of her youth, Flowers started to joke with her grandson that she too could become a DJ. A few days later, Flowers confirmed to him that she was actually serious about that idea.

She was then introduced to a young French producer, Aurélien Simon, whose musical project caught her enthusiasm. He introduced her to electro, trained her in DJing techniques and helped her build her image. She progressively began to develop her own mixing style, with influences from some of her favorite artists, including Freddie Mercury, The Black Eyed Peas, and several other top names in the music business.

Her first gig was in front of a crowd of celebrities such as Lenny Kravitz and Mariah Carey, during the 2009 Cannes Film Festival, at the Villa Murano. She then played at the Queen Club in Paris, on 28 January 2010.

She has made TV appearances and radio broadcasts all over the world.

=== 2010–2014 ===
Her first single, "Still Rocking", came out on 5 July 2010. Her last single "Kissy Kissy" was released on 7 April 2014.

=== Death ===
Flowers died on 26 May 2014. The news was delivered to her fans through her official website and Facebook page.

== Discography ==
=== Singles ===
- "Still Rocking" (2010)
- "69" (2012)
- "Kissy Kissy" (2014)
