= Bi Hao =

Chinese military officer (1927–2014)

- 毕皓

Political commissar of Chengdu Military Region Air Force
- In office January 1978 – January 1993
- Preceded by: Feng Yingshan
- Succeeded by: Shao Rongtang

Personal details
- Born: 1927 Fuyu, Jilin, China
- Died: 2014 (aged 86–87) Beijing, China
- Party: Chinese Communist Party

Military service
- Allegiance: People's Republic of China
- Branch/service: People's Liberation Army Air Force
- Years of service: 1945–1993
- Rank: Lieutenant general
- Battles/wars: Korean War

Chinese name
- Traditional Chinese: 毕皓
- Simplified Chinese: 畢皓
Transcriptions
Standard Mandarin
- Hanyu Pinyin: Bì Hào

Bi Hao (Chinese: 毕浩; 1927 – 21 May 2014) was a Chinese military commander in the People's Liberation Army Air Force (PLAAF) of China. He attained the rank of major general in September 1988 and lieutenant general in July 1990. He was a delegate to the 6th and 7th National People's Congress and a member of the 8th National Committee of the Chinese People's Political Consultative Conference.

== Biography ==
Born in Fuyu, Jilin in 1927, Bi Hao joined the Northeast People's Autonomous Army in 1945, and two years later he joined the Chinese Communist Party. He served in various posts in the Northeast Democratic Allied Army before taking part in the Liaoshen Campaign.

After the establishment of the People's Republic of China, he became the deputy political commissar of PLA Air Force Flight Brigade in 1952. After the outbreak of the Korean War, the Chinese government appointed him as political commissar of the People's Volunteer Army Air Force Flight Brigade. He was political commissar of the Fourth Corps of the PLAAF in June 1979, and held that office until December 1980. He became deputy director of the Political Department of PLAAF in December 1980, and two years later promoted to Director. He rose to political commissar of Chengdu Military Region Air Force in January 1987, he remained at that position until January 1993. He died of an illness in Beijing on May 21, 2014.

Military offices
Preceded by Feng Yingshan	Political commissar of Chengdu Military Region Air Force; 1978-1993	Succeeded by Shao Rongtang
