= Bill Coughlin (journalist) =

- Born: William J. Coughlin; May 29, 1922; Washington D.C., U.S.
- Died: May 8, 2014 (aged 91); Bolivia, North Carolina, U.S.
- Occupation(s): Journalist, editor, news correspondent
- Awards: Pulitzer Prize for Public Service, 1990

William J. Coughlin (May 29, 1922 – May 8, 2014) was an American newspaper journalist. He is known for his Pulitzer Prize win in 1990 for Public Service. He began his journalism career in 1947 for the United Press Intl. in San Francisco, beginning his journalism career. Later in 1952, he joined McGraw-Hill in London, eventually taking over the Moscow department. In 1959, he moved to the Sunday Times in London. Then, he returned to the U.S. working various jobs, before getting a job at the Washington, NC newspaper where he won the Pulitzer Prize.

He also taught journalism at Francis Marion University and wrote books.

At the time of his death he lived in Southport, NC.
