= Mary Lou Harkness =

American librarian (1925–2014)

- Born: Mary Lou Barker; August 19, 1925; Denby, South Dakota, U.S.
- Died: May 13, 2014 (aged 88); Tampa, Florida, U.S.
- Education: Nebraska Wesleyan University, University of Michigan, Columbia University
- Occupations: Librarian, Library Director
- Employer: University of South Florida
- Spouse: Donald Harkness

Mary Lou Harkness (August 19, 1925 – May 13, 2014) was a librarian and a university library director, the first woman to hold that title at any Florida university. She was the fourth employee hired by the University of South Florida.

== Early life ==
She was born Mary Lou Barker in Denby, South Dakota, where her father was proprietor of a general store on the Oglala Sioux Indian Reservation. Mary and her brother would either walk or ride horseback to a two-room schoolhouse during her grade school years, but by her senior year she and her family had moved to Gordon, Nebraska to live with family friends. She graduated high school as valedictorian. Following that, she earned her Bachelor of Science degree from Nebraska Wesleyan University. Next, she attended the University of Michigan for two semesters of post-graduate study. Finally, she earned the master's degree in library science from Columbia University.

== Career ==
Her first employment in the field of librarianship was at the Georgia Institute of Technology, before her graduation from Columbia University. While at Columbia, she was recruited to work at Florida's newest state university, the University of South Florida. She was hired in 1958 as a catalog librarian, the fourth employee of the university. Harkness and other library employees worked at a house in Tampa's Hyde Park neighborhood, a house on campus, and the university student union ballroom before the library building opened in 1961.

In 1968, Harkness became the library's director. She was the first woman to hold such a position in the Florida university system, and at the time, one of a few to hold such a position nationwide.

== Legacy ==
Her career at USF saw her help create a library collection that started from zero, and grew to approximately 800,000 by the time she retired as library director in 1988. During this time she helped to implement automation technology, and she fought to ensure that it received its fair share of funding, from Florida legislators who, she said, tended to favor older universities in the state.

In 1962, Harkness traveled to Nigeria to assist with the creation of national system of libraries. She felt strongly about women's rights and women in politics. She was member of the Athena Society, the USF Women's Club, and she also worked on the campaigns of former state Sen. Betty Castor (who was also USF's first female president), and former Tampa Mayor Pam Iorio.
