= Clara W. Hall =

American chemist (1930–2014)

Clara E. Walke Hall
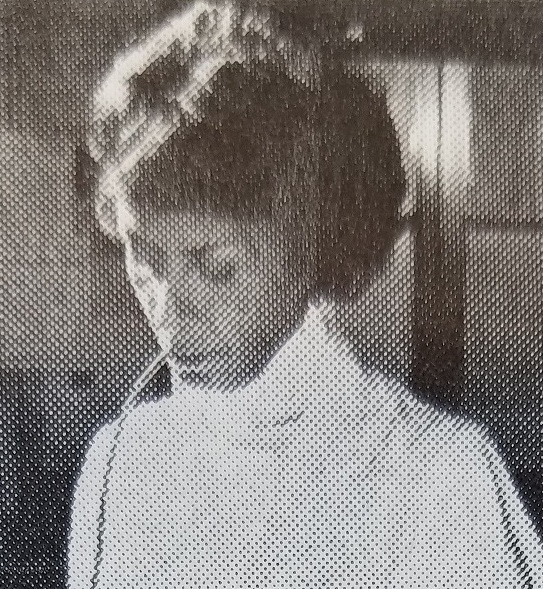
- Hall in 1975
- Born: October 3, 1930; New York City, U.S.
- Died: May 28, 2014 (aged 83); Washington, D.C., U.S.
- Education: Hunter College
- Children: 2
- Scientific career
- Workplaces: Columbia University College of Physicians & Surgeons; National Institutes of Health

Clara E. Walke Hall (October 3, 1930 – May 28, 2014) was an American research chemist at the National Institutes of Health from 1959 to 1999. Hall and geneticist Elizabeth F. Neufeld's research on genetic conditions affecting lysosomes led to Neufeld receiving the Lasker-DeBakey Clinical Medical Research Award in 1982.

== Education and career ==
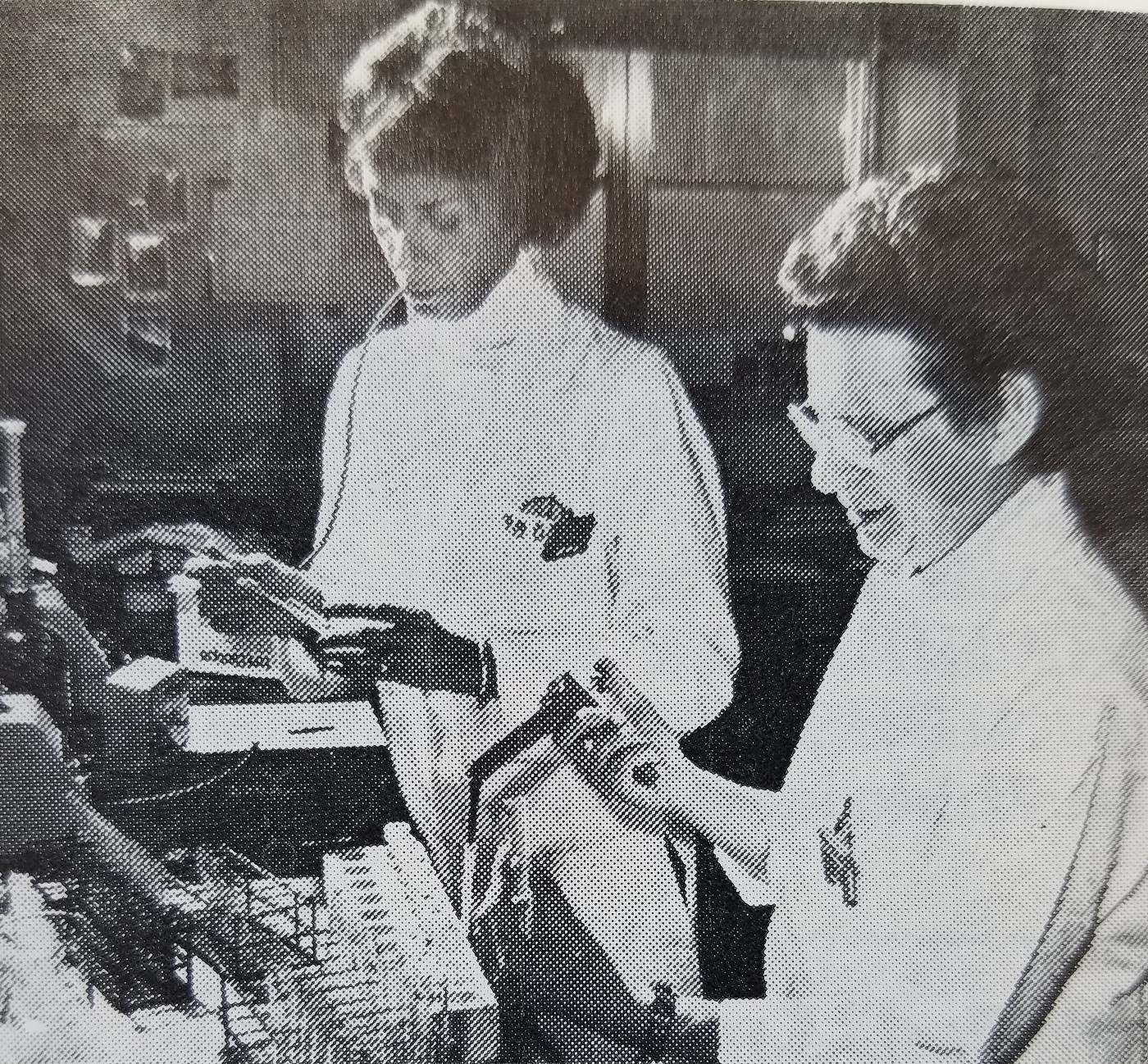
Hall (l) and Neufeld (r) in 1975

Clara E. Walke Hall was born October 3, 1930, in New York City. She earned a B.S. in chemistry from Hunter College.

Hall was a research scientist at the Columbia University College of Physicians & Surgeons before joining the National Institutes of Health (NIH) in 1959. At NIH, she joined the National Institute of Arthritis, Metabolism and Digestive Diseases which later became the National Institute of Diabetes and Digestive and Kidney Diseases.

Hall worked with Elizabeth F. Neufeld studying genetic conditions affecting lysosomes. These disorders can cause skeletal abnormalities, intellectual disabilities, and a shortened lifespan. In 1982, the duo’s research earned Neufeld the Lasker-DeBakey Clinical Medical Research Award. Hall, an African American scientist, did not receive the award, even though Neufeld did not want her colleague’s work to go unrecognized. Hall retired in 1999.

== Personal life ==
Hall was a classically trained pianist and cellist. In the early 1960s, she began tutoring inner-city elementary school students. Hall continued for ten years, then returned to tutoring after retiring from NIH. Hall was a tennis fan and regularly attended the US Open.

Hall had a daughter and son.

Hall died May 28, 2014, in Washington, D.C.
