= Roger Stanley =

American politician

Roger C. Stanley (April 30, 1943 – May 24, 2014) was an American Republican politician from Illinois. His nickname was "The Hog".

Born in Windham, Ohio, he received his bachelor's degree from Kent State University in education and political science. He also went to the University of Louisiana at Lafayette and University of Southern California. He lived in Streamwood, Illinois.

Stanley served in the Illinois House of Representatives from 1977 to 1982 as a Republican. He was also the administrative assistant to the speaker of the Illinois House of Representatives.

In 2002, Stanley was indicted by the United States Government for corruption in the Illinois Governor George Ryan corruption case. He later testified in a plea deal against Ryan's former Chief of Staff Scott Fawell, admitting he paid kickbacks to win state contracts and campaign business, secretly mailed out vicious and false attacks on political opponents and helped obtain a ghost-payrolling jobs.

He died on May 24, 2014, in Costa Rica.
