= Allan Folsom =

American novelist

- Born: Allan Reed Folsom; December 9, 1941; Orlando, Florida, U.S.
- Died: May 16, 2014 (aged 72)
- Education: Boston University
- Occupations: Screenwriter; novelist
- Spouse: Karen Glick (m. 1979)
- Children: 1
- Writing career
- Notable work: The Day After Tomorrow (1994)

Allan Reed Folsom (December 9, 1941 – May 16, 2014) was an American screenwriter and novelist.

== Early life ==
Folsom was born in Orlando, Florida on December 9, 1941, and grew up in Boston, Massachusetts. He studied communications at Boston University and graduated in 1963.

== Career ==
After graduation, he worked as a camera man, editor, writer and producer in California. He then wrote scripts for TV series and films, such as Hart to Hart.

He wrote five books: The Day After Tomorrow (1994), Day of Confession (1998), The Exile (2004), The Machiavelli Covenant (2006) and The Hadrian Memorandum (2009).

His first novel, The Day After Tomorrow, was published in 1994, debuted at #3 on the New York Times bestseller list and netted over 1.2 million copies. Little, Brown and Company and Warner Books purchased the novel for $2 million - the highest amount at that time for a first-time novelist.

== Personal life ==
Folsom married Karen Glick in 1979. They lived in Santa Barbara, California with their daughter Riley. Folsom died there on May 16, 2014, at the age of 72 of metastatic melanoma.

== Bibliography ==
1. The Day After Tomorrow (1994)
2. Day of Confession (1998)
3. The Exile (2004)
4. The Machiavelli Covenant (2006)
5. The Hadrian Memorandum (2009)
