= Albert Attalla =

- Born: 29 September 1931; Cuyahoga Falls, Ohio
- Died: 26 May 2014 (aged 82); Glendale, Arizona
- Education: Masters, PhD
- Occupation: Scientist
- Spouse: Mary Jane Attalla
- Children: 3 Daughters

Albert Attalla (1931-2014) was a pioneer of Nuclear Magnetic Resonance (NMR). He worked as a scientist for Monsanto Research Corporation, Mound Laboratories, in Miamisburg, Ohio, writing many articles about his research, including "Lithium isotopic analysis by nuclear magnetic resonance spectrometry."

== Birth ==
Albert Attalla was born in Cuyahoga Falls, Ohio, on September 29, 1931, to Ida and Farris Attalla in their home.

== Articles ==
- Lithium Isotopic Analysis by Nuclear Magnetic Resonance Spectrometry, Albert Attalla and Ralph R. Eckstein, Anal. Chem., 1971, 43 (7), pp 949–950, DOI: 10.1021/ac60302a037, June 1971
- NMR Studies of the Helium Distribution in Uranium Tritide, Robert C. Bowman Jr. and Albert Attalla, Phys. Rev. B 16, 1828 – Published 1 September 1977
- Investigation of TiH_{x}/KC1O_{4} and Boron/CaCrO_{4} Pyrotechnic Systems by Pulsed NMR, Majorie F Hauenstein and Albert Attalla, MLM, 2596, National Technical Information Services, 1979

== Death ==
Albert Attalla died at Banner Thunderbird Medical Center on May 26, 2014, of cardiac arrest after suffering from a brain hemorrhage on May 12. His wife and middle daughter were by his side when he passed. He donated his body to Research for Life and after all tissue samples were taken, his body was cremated and returned to his family.

Albert is mentioned in the "Pray for the Deceased" section of the Church of St. Thomas More June 22, 2014, bulletin.
