= Michael Kay (professor) =

American academic

Michael Kay (September 13, 1927 - May 31, 2014) was a historian of American history. Formerly of Alfred University, he was summarily dismissed from his post in 1968 after he violated university regulations regarding protests at an ROTC demonstration. In subsequent years, Kay would allege that he had been punished for his political opinions. A 1970 AAUP report on the case made clear that other faculty at Alfred U who shared his political opinions suffered no penalties. Kay then taught at West Chester State University in Pennsylvania where his contract was not renewed after a contentious year. At West Chester, he received support from the university student government (IGA), which voted to establish an IGA Visiting Fellowship and to make Kay its first recipient. The university refused to permit him to resume his membership on the faculty. He eventually found employment at the University of Toledo where he received tenure and remained on the faculty until his retirement in 1992. He left his papers to the University of Toledo. Kay died in 2014.

== See also ==
- Academic freedom
