= Brij Bihari Chaubey =

Indian Vedic and Sanskrit scholar

Brij Bihari Chaubey (Sanskrit: व्रजविहारिचतुर्वेदी; 1 July 1940 – 11 May 2014), was an Indian Vedic and Sanskrit scholar based in Hoshiarpur, Punjab. He was awarded the President's Certificate of Honour by A. P. J. Abdul Kalam in 2004.

== Early life ==
Brij was born on 1 July 1940 in the village Javahin in district Ballia, Uttar Pradesh. His primary education was in Ballia. He obtained his Bachelor of Arts and Master of Arts degrees from there in 1959 and 1961 respectively. His teachers included Baladeva Upadhyaya and Siddheshwar Bhattacharya, under whom he completed his PhD in 1964. His dissertation was titled Treatment of Nature in the Rgveda.

=== Teaching career ===
Chaubey worked as a lecturer in the Institute of Oriental Philosophy, Vrindavan, from 1965 to 1967. In 1967, he joined the Vishveshvaranand Vedic Research Institute in Hoshiarpur, Punjab. He worked at the institute for 35 years, as a lecturer, reader, professor, and finally as the director. He retired in 2002.

Chaubey died on 10 May 2014 in Hoshiarpur, after being ill for some time.

== Awards ==
- 1974. The V. Raghavan Award by the Akhil Bharatiya Prachya Vidya Sammelan.
- 1995. The Sanskrit Sahitya Vishishta Puraskara by the Uttar Pradesh Sanskrit Sansthan, Lucknow.
- 2000. The Veda Vidvan Puraskara by the Maharshi Sandipani Veda Vidya Pratishtan, Ujjain.
- 2004. The Acharya Parashuram Dvivedi Smriti Puraskara by the Hindi Pracharini Sabha, Ballia.
- 2004. The President's Certificate of Honour by A. P. J. Abdul Kalam, the then President of India.
- 2008. The Shastrimani award by the Tirumala Tirupati Devasthanams.
- 2010. The Guru Gangeshwaranand Veda Vedanga Puraskara.
- 2010. The Vishishta Puraskara by the Uttar Pradesh Sanskrit Sansthan, Lucknow.

== Works ==
Chaubey authored 29 books and around 125 papers.

== Works cited ==
- Tripathi, Radha Vallabh, ed. (2012). संस्कृतविद्वत्परिचायिका – Inventory of Sanskrit Scholars (PDF). New Delhi, India: Rashtriya Sanskrit Sansthan. ISBN 978-93-8611-185-2.
