= Tommie Wright =

American pianist, composer and professor

Tommie Wright (March 21, 1919 – May 8, 2014) was an American pianist, composer and professor best known for composing the Florida State Seminoles fight song.

Wright was a native of Indianapolis, Indiana. He received a degree from Arthur Jordan Conservatory of Music. He then received his master's degree from Indiana University Bloomington. He worked for as a pianist for NBC, providing background music for radio soap operas, TV shows and composing jingles for radio advertising. He served in the air force during World War II and wrote a musical for entertainment for the soldiers, entitled "Forward March." He has also written a plethora of musical compositions, ranging from songs, to ballets, to solo piano works.

He was hired to teach music as a professor at Florida State University from 1949 to 2008.

He taught there for years, teaching nearly 60,000 students. His music history course for non-majors was especially popular among students. He also started the Radio & Television department at Florida State. In August 2012, FSU presented Wright with an honorary doctorate.

== Florida State Seminoles Fight Song ==
Wright wrote the song with Doug Alley (a student at the school) in 1950. Doug Alley original wrote the song as a poem and Wright added music to it. He conducted the Marching Chiefs for the first time at a game in 2008

== Personal life and death ==
Wright was married for over 30 years to Rosalinda, head of the foreign languages department at Tallahassee Community College with whom he had 3 daughters. He had also three other daughters from previous marriages. Three of his children went on to pursue music in adulthood, one as a voice teacher, one as a pianist, and one as a broadway performer. He died in Tallahassee Memorial Hospital on May 8, 2014.
