= Non-Timber Forest Products – Exchange Programme =

International environmental organization based in the Philippines

Non-Timber Forest Products - Exchange Programme
- Type: International non-governmental organization
- Founded: 1998
- Headquarters: Quezon City, Philippines
- Website: ntfp.org

The Non-Timber Forest Products – Exchange Programme (NTFP-EP) is a network of non-governmental organizations and community-based organizations in Southeast Asia and South Asia that promotes the use of non-timber forest products (NTFPs) for forest conservation and as a source of livelihood for forest-based communities. The network has a regional secretariat office in the Philippines with country-level offices in Cambodia, India, Indonesia, Malaysia, the Philippines, and Vietnam.

NTFP-EP's work focuses on community-based conservation, tenure rights and governance, sustainable livelihoods, indigenous food and health, strengthening cultural identity, gender equality, and youth empowerment. The organization conducts information and knowledge exchange activities, trainings, and advocacy work with network partners and supporting organizations as part of its capacity building activities.

== History ==
NTFP-EP started informally in 1998 as a group of forest professionals working in India, Indonesia, Malaysia, the Philippines, and Vietnam. In September 2003, the group was formally registered in the Securities and Exchange Commission as a non-profit organization based in Quezon City, Philippines. Dutch ethnobiologist Johannes Henricus de Beer served as NTFP-EP's first executive director from 1998 to 2010.

In its early years, the regional secretariat organization was originally called the Non-Timber Forest Products Exchange Programme for South and Southeast Asia. Meanwhile, the NTFP-EP Philippines country office was formerly called the Non-Timber Forest Products Task Force. The names were later shortened and re-organized to its current form in 2012.

Today, the organization has fully established country offices in Quezon City, Bogor, and Phnom Penh with smaller country offices in Kotagiri, Miri, and Ho Chi Minh City.

== Activities ==
=== Regional ===
Since 2007, NTFP-EP has hosted Madhu Duniya, an international conference on forest honey and Asian bee species held every four years in Southeast Asia.

In 2016, the Food and Agriculture Organization partnered with NTFP-EP to assess the role of NTFPs in cosmetics and beauty products. The outcome of this collaboration was jointly published in the book Naturally Beautiful in 2020.

NTFP-EP published the book Wild Tastes in Asia in 2019, detailing various examples of wild foods consumed by indigenous peoples and local communities in Asia.

In a 2019 meeting, the ASEAN Senior Officials on Forestry tasked NTFP-EP to develop guidelines and protocols for harvesting and managing NTFPs in the region. On 21 October 2020, the ASEAN Ministers on Agriculture and Forestry formally adopted the guidelines developed by the organization.

In 2021, NTFP-EP organized the five-day Forest Harvest Community-based NTFP Enterprises Forum, which focused on community enterprises that produces and markets traditional and indigenous products.

In 2022, the Asian Forest Cooperation Organization signed a five-year cooperation deal with NTFP-EP to lead its capacity building program on forest fire management, natural resource conservation, and promotion of local livelihoods within ASEAN member states.

On May 5, 2022, NTFP-EP, in partnership with the Asia Indigenous Peoples Pact (AIPP) and Asian Farmers Association for Sustainable Rural Development (AFA), organized an official side event for the XV World Forestry Congress in Seoul, South Korea, entitled “Communities Speak: Indigenous Peoples’ Local Actions and Initiatives are Vital to Implement the Paris Agreement and the Post-2020 Global Biodiversity Framework.”

NTFP-EP is a member of the Green Livelihoods Alliance, an international alliance of environmental organizations funded by the Dutch Ministry of Foreign Affairs, along with Gaia Amazonas, IUCN Netherlands, Milieudefensie, Sustainable Development Institute Liberia, and Tropenbos International, with Women Engage for a Common Future and FERN acting as technical partners.

NTFP-EP holds observer status at the United Nations Climate Change conference as an admitted NGO.

==== Pastor Rice Small Grants Fund ====
In 2016, NTFP-EP established the Pastor Rice Smalls Grants Fund, a microgrants facility that funds women-led community initiatives in Southeast Asia. The fund was named in memory of Delbert Arthur Rice, an American missionary and environmental activist who served as a board member of NTFP-EP.

=== Country-level ===
In 2014, WWF partnered with NTFP-EP Cambodia to design alternative livelihood projects for forest-based communities in the Kratié and Stung Treng provinces.

In 2017, the National Commission for Culture and the Arts and NTFP-EP Philippines jointly established a School of Living Tradition in Benguet province to help preserve indigenous cultural practices in the region.

In 2021, search engine provider Ecosia partnered with NTFP-EP Philippines to plant native seedlings with the assistance of its partner indigenous and local communities. An estimated 55,000 native tree seedlings were planted in the Sierra Madre mountain range of Luzon, the central mountain ranges of Panay island, and the Kimangkil-Kalanawan-Sumagaya-Pamalihi mountain range in Mindanao.

In 2022, NTFP-EP Indonesia launched its participatory guarantee systems certification for sustainably harvested rattan, with its first certificate awarded to Dutch company Van der Sar Import.

Also in 2022, NTFP-EP Cambodia helped establish several community ecotourism sites in Kratié and Stung Treng provinces through funding from the USAID Greening Prey Lang project.
