= Jhonny Perozo =

Venezuelan footballer (1985–2014)

Personal information
- Full name: Jhonny David Perozo Rodríguez
- Date of birth: 28 April 1985
- Place of birth: Ciudad Ojeda, Zulia, Venezuela
- Date of death: 25 May 2014 (aged 29)
- Place of death: Lagunillas, Zulia, Venezuela
- Height: 1.78 m (5 ft 10 in)
- Position: Defender

Senior career*
Years	Team	Apps	(Gls)
2005–06	Tucanes de Amazonas		
2006–08	Atlético Zulia		
2008–12	Carabobo	23	(1)
2012–13	Zulia	16	(0)
- * Club domestic league appearances and goals as of 22 June 2014

Jhonny David Perozo Rodríguez (28 April 1985 – 25 May 2014) was a Venezuelan footballer who last played as defender for Zulia FC.

He and one of his friends were murdered on 25 May 2014 during a fight in an entertainment center in Lagunillas.
