= Isaac Kungwane =

South African soccer player (1971–2014)

Personal information
- Full name: Isaac Ramaitsane Kungwane
- Date of birth: 2 February 1971
- Place of birth: Fafung, South Africa
- Date of death: 28 May 2014 (aged 43)
- Position: Midfielder

Youth career
- Alexandra Blackpool
- 1990: Kaizer Chiefs

Senior career*
| Years | Team | Apps | (Gls) |
| 1987–1990 | Jomo Cosmos | 17 | (2) |
| 1989 | Milan FC (loan) | 20 | (2) |
| 1990–1998 | Kaizer Chiefs | 120 | (37) |
| 1993 | Pretoria City (loan) | 15 | (5) |
| 1999–2001 | Manning Rangers | 64 | (16) |
| 2001–2002 | Alexandra United | 21 | (2) |
| 2002–2003 | Uthukela | 9 | (2) |
| 2011–2014 | Alex Mamelodi Sundowns | | |
| Total | | 266 | (66) |

International career
| 1996 | South Africa | 2 | (0) |
- * Club domestic league appearances and goals

Isaac Ramaitsane "Shakes" Kungwane (2 February 1971 – 28 May 2014) was a South African football midfielder who played for Kaizer Chiefs, Jomo Cosmos, Pretoria City and Manning Rangers. As a part of the Kaizer Chiefs he wore the number 11 jersey after Nelson Dladla.

== Club career ==
Kungwane, a fan of the Orlando Pirates, started playing at Alexandra Blackpool and was spotted by Vincent Williams, then the manager of Amakhosi’s developmental sides. He left after a loan spell to Milan FC and joined the Kaizer Chiefs. Kungwane turned down offers from Mamelodi Sundowns' Zola Mahobe. Kungwane played made his debut on 28 March 1991 against Hellenic FC.

In 1992, Kungwane faced medical leave for 8 months after a tackle from Sam Kambule in the Charity Spectacular. This medical leave caused weight problems for the remainder of his professional career.

== Goals ==
Kungwane claims that throughout his career he has scored under six goals in a Sowetan interview. He scored a goal against Michau Warriors' Calvin Marlin from the centre line and a curved shot from a direct corner kick against Dinonyana which earned him a national call up in 1996.

== International career ==
He made his international debut on 18 September 1996 in a 2–0 win over Australia as a substitute for David Nyathi in the 63rd minute in the Four Nations Cup. He played his last international only 3 days later in a 0–0 against Ghana as a substitute for Thomas Madigage in the 75th minute.

== Retirement ==
Upon retirement, Kungwane played amateur soccer for Alex Mamelodi Sundowns in the Alexandra Local Masters League. He was a football analyst at SuperSport. SuperSport have launched a highlight feature called Kasi Flavour, in his honour.

Kungwane owned the Shakes Kungwane Alex Football Academy that was established two months before his death. The team made it to the preliminary stages of the 2014 Engen Knockout Challenge. The team took part in the Engen U17 tournament in July 2014. The team participates in the Alexandra Northrand Local Football Association.

== Personal life ==
Kungwane married Busisiwe Precious in 2002. They had three children, Kabelo, Neo and Thato.

== Death ==
Kungwane died on 28 May 2014 after being in ICU for 2 days. He died from complications with diabetes Kungwane had been sick and was admitted on numerous occasions around April and was re-admitted again on 26 May 2014. Gordon Igesund, Kungwane's former coach said, "It’s terrible to hear that and very sad to think about his passing on. He was a lovely person and very humble and with so much respect of people. May his soul rest in peace." His memorial service which took place at Three Square in Alexandra. Kungwane was buried in Fafung, Brits in North West.
