= George Kohut =

American camera operator (1943–2014)

- Born: November 22, 1943; Ukrainian SSR, Soviet Union (now Ukraine)
- Died: May 8, 2014 (aged 70); Chicago, Illinois, United States
- Occupation(s): Camera operator, workers' rights activist

George Kohut (November 22, 1943 – May 8, 2014) was a camera operator and workers' rights activist.

Born in the Ukrainian SSR, Soviet Union (now Ukraine), Kohut's family emigrated to America, and in 1961 he enlisted in the United States Army, around the time of the Cuban Missile Crisis. During this time, he met a fellow cameraman, Michael O'Sullivan, who invited him to join him in Chicago, the city he made his home.

In his career, Kohut participated in several Chicago-based film productions, including Ferris Bueller's Day Off, Batman Begins, The Fugitive, and Groundhog Day

Kohut died in Chicago on May 8, 2014, age 70. He was survived by a wife and son.
