= William J.D. Escher =

William Julius D. ("Bill") Escher (1931 – May 12, 2014) was an aerospace engineer involved in the early development of the United States rocket programs and long time aerospace industry visionary. He was an internationally recognized expert in the field of high-speed airbreathing propulsion and hypersonic flight. He was a long been a proponent of combined-cycle propulsion systems for space access and his visionary 'Synerjet' concept is industry recognized. He wrote over a hundred technical papers on this subject and others such as hydrogen energy and lunar exploration.

He had a long career in aerospace spanning more than 60 years. While in the Army and assigned to the Naval Research Lab (NRL), he was a countdown officer for the Vanguard rocket program in 1957. He was later employed by NASA (Lewis, Marshall, and Headquarters), Marquardt, Kaiser-Marquart, North American Rockwell and Rocketdyne, Astronautics Corporation of America, University of Toronto, Escher Technology Assoc., Escher-Foster Technology Assoc., SAIC, and SpaceWorks. He was also one of the co-founders and long time members of the Space Propulsion Synergy Team (SPST).

He was the author of the SAE book entitled "Synerjet Engine: Airbreathing/Rocket Combined-Cycle Propulsion for Tomorrow's Space Transports."

In 1988, he was awarded the prestigious AIAA George M. Low Space Transportation Award for excellence in the field of space transportation. His Low award citation reads: "For outstanding and sustained contributions to the field of space transportation, from Vanguard to Spaceliner, and for tirelessly promoting a vision for low cost, reliable access to space based on the Synerjet combined-cycle engine."

He held a Bachelor of Science in Engineering degree from George Washington University, having earlier undertaken studies in mechanical engineering at Cornell University and Cleveland State University. At Cornell, he served as the president and experimental committee chairman of the Cornell Rocket Society. He also conducted graduate studies at the University of Southern California and the University of Wisconsin-Madison.
