= Ertuğrul Işınbark =

Turkish stage magician

Mehmet Ertuğrul Işınbark
- Born: July 24, 1940; Fatih, Istanbul, Turkey
- Died: May 28, 2014 (aged 73); Çanakkale, Turkey
- Other name: Mandrake
- Occupations: performer of stage magic, and ventriloquism
- Spouse: Süheyla
- Children: Işın (daughter)

Mehmet Ertuğrul Işınbark (July 24, 1940 – May 28, 2014), a.k.a. Mandrake, was a well-known Turkish stage magician.

== Early years ==
He was born in Fatih, Istanbul on July 24, 1940. His father was a director at the mint.

He was inspired by a magic show he had attended at primary school. Since he quickly uncovered the magic trick he observed, he tried to copy it by himself. Skilled in handicraft, he constructed a cardboard box, in which he put torn newspaper and took out pieces of colored paper as a trick. Thus, he could amaze his classmates and his teacher.

After a hard search, he found a book titled Fenni Eğlenceler ("Scientific Entertainments"), from which he learned the finenesses and the secrets of the stage magic art. He began his career in tents set up at special locations during bayrams, the national or religious celebrations in Turkey.

At the age of ten, he was invited to perform a magic show during a circumcision feast, for which he received a fee. In the beginning, his parents were against a career in stage magic, because they wanted him to receive a higher education like his older brother, who became an engineer. However, as he proved that he could earn money in his job, they agreed. After secondary school, he dropped out and devoted himself to stage magic.

As he was gaining wider interest, he asked his older sister, who was a tailor, to make a tailcoat in black for him, inspired by a photo of the renowned Turkish stage magician Zati Sungur.

== Stage career ==
In 1952, when he was only twelve, Mehmet Ertuğrul Işınbark signed a five–year contract with Fethi Pehlivan, the manager of the renowned singer Zeki Müren. From then on, he used to perform 7–8 shows every night. In 1959, he went on his first tour accompanying the famous singer Safiye Ayla. Later in his career, he went several times around the country visiting many cities, towns and villages.

As he turned 20, his manager gave him the stage name "Sihirbaz Mandrake" ("Mandrake the Magician") after the famous newspaper comic strip, a nickname, with which he became well known in Turkey. He told once that even his wife and his daughter called him with that name at home.

His magic word was "Sim Sala Gala", different from "Abracadabra" or "Hocus Pocus", which other Turkish magicians used. He grew a goatee just like the renowned magician figure of Abracadabra.

After he once observed a ventriloquist on the stage, he decided to perform also this type of stagecraft act. He made a puppeteered "dummy", which he called "Cin Ali" ("Ali the Ghost"). Upon his great success in his performance, his manager asked him to continue with ventriloquism only and to quit stage magic. However, he rejected this proposal, retaining magic shows. The number of his performances at different variety show venues increased up to twelve a night. He received more applause than some star singers on the same stage.

Mandrake was elected Turkish champion of stage magic during a contest in 1965. He established Turkey's first and the only school of stage magic in 1979, with the aim to share his knowledge and skills, and to contribute to the education of young people in the art of stage magic. Many Turkish stage magicians of today were his students.

His main characteristic was to invent new magic tricks. Many of his tricks were taken over into related European catalogues.

== Family life ==
In 1958, he met his later wife Süheyla during a feast fair in Karagümrük, Istanbul. He returned from his first tour in 1959 with some money in his purse, he married her. The next year, he went into military service in Eskişehir, his wife followed him there.

Süheyla became his assistant on the stage. At the age of three and half, their daughter Işın began to join them on the stage as well. After his wife retired, their daughter, a bank employee, and her husband assisted Mandrake at the shows.

Mehmet Ertuğrul Işınbark died of cardiac insufficiency at the age of 73 on May 28, 2014. He was hospitalized from his summer residence at Gelibolu, Çanakkale on May 19. His corpse was transferred to Istanbul on May 29, and he was given a religious ceremony at Fatih Mosque.
