= Mehroo Bengalee =

Vice Chancellor of University of Mumbai
- In office 1986–1992

Personal details
- Occupation: Academic

Mehroo Dhunjisha Bengalee (29 December 1931 – 21 May 2014) was an Indian Parsi academic. She served as Vice Chancellor of the University of Mumbai from 1986 to 1992, the first woman to hold this post.

Bengalee earned a master’s in education, followed by a PhD in economics and psychology from the University of Mumbai, in 1965. She started her career at St Xavier's Institute of Education and later became a professor at the St. Xavier's College, Mumbai. She served as Head of the Department of Education at the University of Mumbai from 1984 to 1986.

Bengalee was also a former trustee of the Bombay Parsi Punchayet and a founding member of the National Commission for Minorities.

Bengalee died on 21 May 2014, at the age of 82.
