= Emanuel Raymond Lewis =

American historian

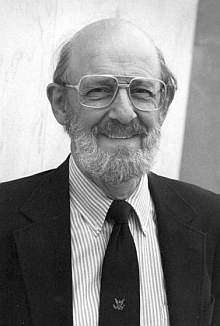
- Born: November 30, 1928; Oakland, California, United States
- Died: May 14, 2014 (aged 85); Bethesda, Maryland, U.S.
- Education: University of California BA/MA; University of Oregon PhD in Education
- Known for: House Librarian US House of Representatives; Military Historian; Educational Psychology
- Spouse: Eleanor G. Lewis

Emanuel Raymond Lewis (Ray Lewis) was the longest-serving and final House Librarian for the United States House of Representatives Library in the U.S. Capitol Building. He was appointed House Librarian in 1973, and served in this position until January 1995, at which time the library, along with the House Historical Office, was reorganized and placed under the new Legislative Resource Center, a division of the Office of the Clerk. The House Library predated the Library of Congress, serving as the official repository of Congressional documents generated by the U.S. House of Representatives since 1792.

Other House librarians included Calvin Clifford Chaffee, a physician and abolitionist who represented Springfield, Massachusetts as a congressman during the 34th and 35th Congresses from 1855 to 1859. Chaffee's political career suffered after he and the public learned in 1857 that his wife, Irene Sanford Emerson, owned several slaves, including the enslaved American Dred Scott. After his stint as a congressman, Chaffee served as house librarian during the 36th Congress, from until 1859 - 1861. William H. Smith, the first African American to hold this position, served as librarian during the 47th Congress (1881-1883).

In 1971 Lewis was called to testify before a subcommittee of the U.S. House Interior Committee during hearings on creating the Golden Gate National Recreation Area from land previously used as military bases. His testimony was instrumental in the preservation of over 80,000 acres of land in the San Francisco bay area for recreational use. As a historian, Dr. Lewis had extensive knowledge of military installations in this region. Dr. Lewis had previously been commissioned by the State of California State to prepare "A History of San Francisco Harbor Defense Installations: Forts Baker, Barry, Cronkite, and Funston".

During the House Judiciary Committee’s impeachment hearings on President Nixon in July 1974, Lewis provided critical historical references to guide the committee in its work, during its hearings for the impeach the President, the first impeachment hearing for a president since that of Andrew Johnson in 1869.

== Early years ==
Ray Lewis was the second son of Jewish Siberian immigrants, Jacob A. Lewis (born Jacob Lanis) and Rose Grossman. Jacob had immigrated to the United States, alone, at the age of 17 in 1916, during an era of antisemitic pogroms in Siberia. J.A. Lewis donated the land for the park in Hayward, California that bears his name. He was later able to bring one of his brothers, but Russia restricted emigration, and he was unable to get his other family members out of Russia. Ray was born in Oakland, Alameda County, California on November 30, 1928, grew up and attended high school there. He then attended the University of California at Berkeley, earning bachelor and master degrees.

== Military service ==
Lewis was commissioned as a first lieutenant in the Coast Artillery Corps, but it was abolished shortly after his commission. He was then transferred to Military Intelligence, where he served from 1954 to 1956. As Lewis’ parents spoke Russian in the home, he was a fluent speaker of Russian. He was assigned the position of commander for a group of Soviet military defectors, and given the responsibility for testing security at military bases. He retired as a captain. His ashes are inurned in the Columbarium at Arlington National Cemetery.

== Professional career ==
After his military service he earned a PhD in educational psychology at the University of Oregon, with a grant from the National Institute of Mental Health (NIMH). He became a tenured psychology professor in the Oregon University System. Lewis was among the first psychology professors to participate in the creation of the Oregon State Board of Psychologist Examiners, and the first Oregon professor to teach on campus through television.

In 1969, working at Systems Development Corporation of Santa Monica, California – considered the world's first computer software company – Lewis co-authored ‘‘The Educational Information Center: An Introduction,’’ a general guide to the process of establishing an educational information center.

As a postdoctoral research associate from 1969 to 1970 at the Smithsonian Institution, Lewis wrote and illustrated the book "Seacoast Fortifications of the United States: An Introductory History" published by the Smithsonian Institution Press in 1970. This followed a previous book; "The Development of American Seacoast Defenses". He continued to publish widely in military and naval-related journals.

=== Books ===
- Differential Effects of Duration of Prior Learning Upon Subsequent Problem Solving (1953) University of California, Berkeley
- Reward and Punishment Orientations: Two Approaches to a Concept Learning Task (1962) University of Oregon Press.
- Popper (1961) Harrap (publisher)
- Journalism Handbook, Grade 9 (1965) Sherril Harshbarger, Emanuel Raymond Lewis, Medford Public Schools (Medford, Or.) School District #549C
- Tentative Course of Study, Beginning Journalism I: Grade 8 (1967) Medford Public Schools (Medford, Or.) School District 549C.
- A History of San Francisco Harbor Defense Installations: Forts Baker, Barry, Cronkhite, and Funston. January 1, 1965 by Emanuel Raymond Lewis
- The Development of American Seacoast Defenses (1967).
- American Seacoast Fortifications: A Developmental History (1968)
- The Educational Information Center: An Introduction. (1969) by C. Neil Sherman, E. Raymond Lewis and Judith Wanger. Published by System Development Corporation, under contract to the U.S. Office of Education.
- Seacoast Fortifications of the United States: An Introductory History. (1995) The Naval Institute Press

=== Journal articles ===
- Military Affairs, subsequently publishing as the Journal of Military History
- Capitol Studies: A Biannual Journal Devoted to the Capitol and Congress, now published as Congress and the Presidency
- TME The Military Engineer
- Proceedings (of the U.S. Naval Institute)
- Encyclopedia of the United States Congress
- Warship International
