= Jerrold E. Lomax =

American architect

- Born: Jerrold Ellsworth Lomax; April 10, 1927; Los Angeles, California, U.S.
- Died: May 17, 2014 (aged 87); Monterey, California, U.S.
- Education: University of Houston
- Occupation: Architect
- Spouse: Sandra E. Miles
- Children: 2

Jerrold Ellsworth "Jerry" Lomax (1927–2014) was an American architect from Los Angeles, California.

== Early life ==
Lomax was born on April 10, 1927 in Los Angeles, California.

His father was Andrew J. Lomax and his mother, Esther L. Williams. He moved to Houston, Texas with his parents in 1938, when he was eleven years old. He joined the United States Naval Reserve, serving from 1945 to 1946, including a tour in Japan. He graduated from the University of Houston, where he received a Bachelor of Science in Architecture in 1951.

== Career ==
Lomax worked as an architect for three years in Houston, then returned to Los Angeles, working as lead designer for Craig Ellwood Associates from 1953 to 1962. Together Lomax and Elwood designed the Pierson House, the Daphne House, and the Korsen House. They also designed the Steinman House and the Hunt House, both of which were located in Malibu. In 1957–1958, they designed Case Study House #18 in Beverly Hills.

In 1962, Lomax established Lomax Associates, based in Los Angeles. During the 1970s, he partnered with Donald Mills, and in the 1980s, with John Rock in Venice, California. He and his partners designed corporate headquarters and shopping centers. Examples of his designs include the headquarters of Miller Desk and, with Rock, the Trailer Life Publishing company and the Beverly Connection shopping center in the West Hollywood community.

He designed multiple modern residences, including the Moses Residence, the Landsburg Residence in Malibu, and the Charles Rice Residence in Glendale. He worked with fellow architect Philo Jacobson. He designed four houses with his wife, Sandra Miles, in Westwood, the Pacific Palisades, Carmel Valley and Sand City.

Lomax participated in the 1976 LA12 exhibition at the Pacific Design Center He was a member of the Monterey Bay chapter of the American Institute of Architects based in Sand City, California.

== Personal life ==
He married Sandra E. Miles in 1976. They resided in a house he co-designed with Donald Mills, located at 1995 Sunset Plaza Drive in West Hollywood., until they moved to Monterey, California in 1995.

== Death ==
He died of pancreatic cancer on May 17, 2014, aged 87.
