= Gisela Kessler =

German trade unionist

Gisela Kessler (June 3, 1935 – May 14, 2014) was a German trade unionist.

== Life ==
Kessler was born in Frankfurt am Main. She worked as a Clerk for Deutsche Bundespost, studied at the Akademie der Arbeit in Frankfurt and worked for the German Confederation of Trade Unions from 1967. From 1971 to 1991 she worked for the Printing and Paper Union, later the Media Union. She was vice chairwoman of IG Medien until 1995. Gisela Kessler was affiliated with the German Communist Party. In 2005 she was one of the founders of Labour and Social Justice – The Electoral Alternative. She was member of The Left.
