= Saleh Wreikat =

Jordanian politician

Saleh Wreikat (c. 1939 – 22 May 2014) was a Jordanian politician. He was a member of the 16th House of Representatives for the 5th District of Amman.

In March 2011 in a vote of confidence he supported Prime Minister Marouf al-Bakhit.

In the House of Representatives he was head of the House Water and Agriculture Committee. Wreikat supported the right of Palestinians to their own state.

Wreikat died on 22 May 2014, aged 74.
