= José Falcó Sanmartín =

Spanish pilot

José Falcó Sanmartín (September 27, 1916 in Barcelona – May 10, 2014 in Toulouse) was a Spanish pilot who served in the Spanish Republican Air Force and fought the Spanish Civil War, with three official victories and a probable victory.

Born in Barcelona on September 27, 1916, he passed the entrance exams as a pilot in December 1936 and joined Aviacion in March 1937. He officially became a pilot on October 31. During the Spanish Civil War, he completed 366 hours of flight and participated in 20 battles. In his final battle on February 6, 1939, he shot down and killed Friedrich Windemuth.

Sanmartin was exiled to France and obtained French citizenship. He got a job in Toulouse as a civil engineer and retired in 1976. He frequently cleaned the grave of Windemuth out of respect for his adversary.

The French journalist Pierre Challier wrote a biography of Sanmartín. He died from natural causes, aged 97.
