= Petro Chernyaha =

Ukrainian academic

Petro Hervaziyovych Chernyaha (24 October 1946 – 12 May 2014) was a Ukrainian scientist and public figure, professor, PhD (Technical Sciences), a member of the Construction Academy of Ukraine and the Academy of Higher Education Sciences of Ukraine, the Honoured Educator of Ukraine and the Honoured Land Surveyor of Ukraine.

== Biography ==
Petro Hervaziyovych Chernyaha was born in the village of Kuhayivtsi, Chemerovetskyi district (rayon), Khmelnytskyi Oblast, Ukraine. In 1964 he finished high school with honours (gold medal) and entered the Lviv Polytechnical Institute (now university), where he studied Astronomic Geodesy. He received a special scholarship (named after Lenin) and was awarded a medal by the Ministry of Higher and Special Education of the USSR for best student scientific paper, titled "Design of Geodetic Connection between Asia and America". He graduated, with honours, in 1969 and continued his studies at the Polytechnical Institute as a post-graduate student.

In November 1973, Chernyaha began to work at the National University of Water Economy and Management of Natural Recourses (which was at the time called the Ukrainian Institute of Water Economy Engineers), first as a teaching assistant, then as a senior lecturer and associate professor in the Department of Engineering Geodesy. For seven years, from 1980 to 1987, he was Deputy Dean of the Faculty of Design and Construction of Hydro Reclamation Systems.

In 1987, Chernyaha became Chair of the Department of Engineering Geodesy. In view of the reforms of land relations and a pressing need for experts in the sphere, in 1992, Chernyaha initiated opening a new specialization, Land Utilization and Land Cadastre, and in 1995 the Department of Engineering Geodesy was renamed the Department of Land Utilization and Geodesy. Another specialization, Geo-information Systems and Technologies, was introduced at the university in 2002 under his leadership. This period saw a rapid development of the Department: its teaching staff increased from 12 to 47 persons and in addition, the materials and resources were upgraded.

In 2003 Chernyaha became dean of the newly established Faculty of Land Utilization and Geo-informatics and worked in this post for 6 years. From 2009 to 2014, Chernyaha was Chair of the Department of Cartography and Geospatial Modelling at his alma mater, the National Lviv Polytechnical University. He was actively involved in the work of the Chair and supervised post-graduate students' research papers till his death.

== Scientific and educational achievements ==
Chernyaha's scientific career began after defending his PhD (Candidate of Sciences) dissertation, Determining Satellite Refraction Considering the State of the Atmosphere, and earning in 1978 the Candidate of Sciences degree. In 1982 he was conferred the position of Associate Professor.

His further research at Ukrainian nuclear power plants and international experience gained at European Geophysics congresses (in Vienna in 1997, Nice in 1998, the Hague in 1999, Poland in 1997, 1998, 1999 and Croatia in 2001) helped him complete his Doctorate dissertation, Geodesic monitoring of the premises of nuclear power plants: theory and practice, and successfully defend it in 2000, with the position of Professor being conferred upon him.

Throughout his scientific career Petro Chernyaha published over 200 scientific, educational and methodological works and made an invention.

Chernyaha was a member of editorial boards of six professional scientific journals, a member of specialized academic dissertation boards at the Kyiv National Construction and Architecture University and the National Lviv Polytechnical University. He also served on the methodological panel on Geodesy, Mapping and Land Utilization, as well as on the committee developing education standards in this subject. And he was a full member of the Ukrainian Academies of Construction and Higher Education Sciences.

Of particular value for students' educational life was the Research Geodynamics and Geo-information Systems laboratory established by Chernyaha at the National University of Water Economy and Management of Natural Recourses. This laboratory was engaged in research in the sphere of land relations reforms, mathematical modeling of geodynamic processes, considering the tropospheric, ionospheric and electro-optical refraction in geodesic surveying and GPS observation.

Chernyaha also established a research institution which made forecasts of territorial development considering the functional properties of territories and the impact of geodynamic processes. This school gained wide recognition in the academic world. Nearly twenty Candidate dissertations and one Doctorate dissertation were defended under his supervision there.

Chernyaha was credited by many scientists, teachers and students with making an invaluable contribution to the development of Geodesy and Land Utilization in Ukraine.

In November 2014, in an annual national scientific conference on Geodesy, Land Utilization and Management of Natural Resources was initiated posthumously in commemoration of Chernyaha at the National University of Water Economy and Management of Natural Recourses in Rivne, where a memorial plaque was unveiled and a classroom was named in his honour. In his lifetime, Chernyaha received numerous awards and titles from various institutions and bodies or government.
