= The Day After Tomorrow (novel) =

1994 novel by Allan Folsom

- Cover of the 1994 edition
- Author: Allan Folsom
- Language: English
- Publication date: 1994

The Day After Tomorrow (1994) is a thriller novel by Allan Folsom which appeared in the number three spot in its first week on the New York Times bestseller list for fiction. Despite this being the first novel by Folsom, the American publishing rights for it were sold for two million dollars.

== Plot summary ==
At a café in Paris, Paul Osborn, an American doctor, sees the man who murdered his father decades earlier and assaults him. The murderer, Henri Kanarack, flees. Though he is arrested for the assault, Osborn downplays it to the French police, claiming that the man had been a petty thief who took his wallet. Although he is instructed to leave France, Osborn instead devises a plan to find Kanarack and torture him to discover why he murdered his father, before killing him and dumping his body in the Seine staged as a drowning accident. In order to obtain sedative drugs for the plot, Osborn turns to his love interest, a young French doctor named Vera Monneray.

A veteran Los Angeles police detective, William McVey, travels to London to consult with Interpol detectives on a series of gruesome murders across the continent. The heads of the murder victims are removed with surgical precision and frozen to temperatures near absolute zero (-273 °C) before being thawed. After Osborn's arrest for assaulting Kanarack puts him on Interpol's radar, McVey questions him about the murders, reasoning that his medical knowledge would have given him the necessary experience to perform the decapitations. Though McVey quickly realizes that Osborn could not be the murderer, he suspects there is more to Osborn's presence in Paris than the French police realize.

Osborn hires a private detective named Jean Packard to locate Kanarack, but Packard's inquiries are indiscreet and alert Kanarack to Osborn's search. Kanarack, whose real name is Albert Merriman, tortures Packard to death and ambushes Osborn, but Osborn is able to get the upper hand on him. Merriman confesses to Osborn that, decades earlier, he had been hired by a wealthy German-American industrialist named Erwin Scholl to carry out multiple contract killings, including Osborn's father. Scholl's organization later tried to kill Merriman, leading him to fake his death and live as Kanarack. Before he can say more, Merriman is shot to death by a third man, who also attempts to kill Osborn. Osborn escapes and takes refuge with Vera, as the police seek him in Kanarack/Merriman's murder.

In New Mexico, a young American physical therapist, Joanna Marsh, is helping German businessman Elton Lybarger recover from a stroke. After months of treatment, Lybarger's organization, led by Scholl, arranges for his return to Germany. Joanna accompanies Lybarger on his return, also joined by his personal doctor, Dr. Salettl, his identical twin nephews Eric and Edward, and other close associates. Salettl instructs Joanna to prepare Lybarger physically and mentally to give an important speech at the Charlottenburg Palace in Berlin the following week. While accompanying Lybarger, Joanna meets Pascal Von Holden, the director of security for his organization, and falls in love with him. Unbeknownst to Joanna, Von Holden also leads a clandestine group of assassins, deeply embedded within Europe's police services and willing to kill in pursuit of Scholl's goals.

On Scholl's and Von Holden's orders, Kanarack's murderer, a former Stasi agent named Bernhard Oven, kills Kanarack's family and close acquaintances over the following days. He tracks Osborn down at Vera's apartment and nearly kills Vera, but flees after Osborn shoots at him. Although Vera claims to have fought Oven alone, McVey suspects Osborn was present, and arranges a clandestine meeting with him even as the French police continue to search for him. Oven follows Osborn to the meeting, but McVey kills him.

As McVey and Osborn investigate Merriman and Oven, they gradually become aware of the Scholl organization's scope; several other policemen investigating the case are murdered, and both men narrowly escape death at the hands of Von Holden's operatives in a train crash. It also becomes clear over time that McVey's decapitation case is connected to the murder of Osborn's father. Before his death, the elder Osborn had invented a surgical scalpel that could be used at extremely low temperatures; Scholl owned the company he worked for, and closed it shortly after his death. McVey learns that others involved in innovations in low-temperature surgeries were also employed by Scholl and later murdered, with their killings disguised as accidents or suicides. The detectives conclude that Scholl's organization has secretly perfected a way to conduct limb transplants at near-zero temperatures—a procedure that could allow doctors to flawlessly graft one person's head onto another's body. McVey and Osborn come to believe that Scholl's organization successfully performed such an operation on Lybarger, with his post-surgical recovery process mirroring a stroke victim's.

Osborn and McVey travel to Berlin to secure an arrest warrant for Scholl. Von Holden tries to draw McVey and members of the German police into a trap and kill them, but the plan is ruined by the unexpected arrival of Osborn, who kills three of Von Holden's assassins and rescues McVey. The two travel to the Charlottenburg Palace, where Lybarger's speech is about to begin, and interrogate Scholl. As the interrogation ends, Salettl abruptly kills Scholl and urges the detectives to leave, before committing suicide. Above them, Lybarger gives his speech to a group of wealthy German elites connected to Scholl's organization. Suddenly, the doors are locked, and cyanide gas is vented into the hall, killing everyone. The Charlottenburg Palace is subsequently destroyed in a fire, along with other buildings belonging to Scholl's organization.

Von Holden, who had left the gathering early, impersonates a policeman and kidnaps Vera, then departs for Switzerland with a mysterious package. As McVey is hospitalized from the Charlottenburg fire, Osborn steals his badge and gun and follows Von Holden. After a multi-leg train pursuit, Osborn tracks Von Holden to the mountain of Jungfrau in Switzerland. Von Holden nearly kills Osborn, but Vera pushes him off the side of the mountain to his likely death; the package is lost with him. Osborn's memories of the fight, the package, and his subsequent rescue are uncertain due to delirium.

Months later, in California, McVey and Osborn meet again, and McVey shows Osborn a videotape he had received from Salettl via an unsuspecting Joanna after his death. In the video, Salettl explains that Scholl had led a neo-Nazi movement formed from the remnants of the Third Reich after the end of the Second World War and intent on rebuilding it in modern Europe. Salettl reveals that he had opposed the organization's goals for many years, but realized that he would have been killed if he rejected it openly. Instead, he remained in Scholl's inner circle, but secretly arranged for the fire and cyanide at the Charlottenburg Palace, destroying the organization in one blow.

Salettl reveals the surgery's purpose: its aim was to recreate a perfect "Aryan" from the form of Lybarger's two nephews, one of whom would become the leader of the movement after he underwent the surgery. Salettl's information leads Osborn to recall Von Holden's final words, referencing the organization's plan—and to remember that his mysterious package contained the severed and deep-frozen head of Adolf Hitler.
