= Salynn McCollum =

American civil rights activist (1940–2014)

- Born: Mary Salynn McCollum; April 6, 1940; Tulsa, Oklahoma, U.S.
- Died: May 1, 2014 (aged 74); Nunnelly, Tennessee, U.S.
- Occupation: Day care Director
- Known for: Civil rights activist, Freedom Rider

Mary Salynn (Selyn) McCollum (April 6, 1940 – May 1, 2014) was the only white female Freedom Rider during the leg from Nashville, Tennessee, to Birmingham, Alabama, on May 17, 1961.

== Early life ==
Born to Hilda and Walter McCollum in Tulsa, Oklahoma, on April 6, 1940, she and her family moved around during her childhood. She eventually ended up in Amherst, New York, where she attended junior high and high school. She has one sister named Rhonda. Though she was admitted to Syracuse University, McCollum's family wanted her to return to the South, as both her parents were born and raised in Tennessee.

== College and SNCC ==
After graduation, she matriculated in 1958 at George Peabody College for Teachers (Note: Now known as Peabody College of Education and Human Development at Vanderbilt University) in Nashville, Tennessee. Her course of study focused on instruction for intellectually and developmentally disabled students. Although she was an undergraduate, she took some graduate level courses. During one such course, she met a Fisk University professor, Lester Carr, who shared her interest in developmentally challenged children. Professor Carr invited McCollum to visit Fisk University to see a classroom of autistic children. He also invited her to come hear Kelly Miller Smith speak at First Baptist, Capitol Hill.

Participation in Civil Rights Movement

McCollum attended training sessions led by Reverend James Lawson on non-violent protesting and also nightly meetings about desegregating downtown Nashville. The workshops were not tactical but instead focused on how to handle hostile citizens who opposed the student demonstrations. After the workshops and meetings, the college students would socialize and eat dinner at a restaurant on Jefferson Street. In February 1961, she attended a Nashville Student Movement meeting as a guest of Central Committee Member, Prof. Carr.

As a result of her participation in the Freedom Rides, and the strife it caused within the college administration her professor, Leonard J. Lucito, arranged for her to attend Southern Illinois University, where she was able to complete her studies. While at SIU, she helped organize lunch counter demonstrations with a few local students and even led a non-violent workshop using what she had learned from Lawson and her Nashville sit in experience. At one of these sit-ins with ten other protesters, she was assaulted with a knife and received a four-five inch cut on the back of her thigh. She was refused hospital care and ended up being driven to East St. Louis to receive care. This event garnered much attention in local and national newspapers. Soon John Lewis joined her in Cairo, Illinois. Upon completion of her course work she returned to Nashville and used scholarship money she received from Dr. Martin Luther King Jr to continue participating in the Movement while student teaching kindergarten on the Peabody's campus.

McCollum visited Highlander Folk School during her time in Student Non-Violent Coordinating Committee (SNCC). In the beginning of 1962, McCollum began working full-time for SNCC in Atlanta. Her duties included handling voter registration in Georgia, fundraising, and public speaking at churches throughout the South. She did not attend the March on Washington because by that time she had developed a dislike of being in large unorganized crowds probably due to her experiences in Cairo, Illinois.

== Freedom Rides ==
There were ten Freedom Riders—two whites (Jim Zwerg and Salynn McCollum)–and eight African Americans: (John Lewis, William Barbee, Paul Brooks, Charles Butler, Allen Carson, Bill Harbour, Catherine Burks, and Lucretia Collins). McCollum was sent as an observer to report back to Diane Nash and was under orders not to be arrested with the other Riders. Leo Lillard drove her to Pulaski, Tennessee where she joined the other Freedom Riders. While some sources say McCollum missed the Nashville bus, she remembers this as an intentional decision to board someplace else to keep herself separate from the group and to try to provide a little protection.

The Freedom Riders did not converse during the rides as to maintain as much anonymity as possible. It was evident though they had been discovered by the time they reached the Alabama state line as armed gunmen were posted along the highway to Birmingham. Upon arrival at the Birmingham bus depot, she attempted to disembark to report back to Nash what was happening but was prevented from leaving the bus. All the passengers were detained for a period of time. Then the regular passengers were let off the bus, but not the Freedom Riders. When the Freedom Riders were finally let off the bus, McCollum joined Catherine Burks and Lucretia Collins thereby identifying herself as a Freedom Rider. By then, she had made the phone call to Diane Nash to inform her of what was happening in Birmingham. Eventually, they arrested all ten of them and took them to jail.

McCollum was separated from the other female Freedom Riders due to her race and held with the white women prisoners. When the white prisoners discovered she was a Freedom Rider, they beat her up and stole her candy and cigarettes. She stayed in jail about three or four days and was eventually released to her father's custody. Her parents were very disappointed and disapproved of her participation in the movement. Then, she was driven to Memphis in a police car by a patrolman and Birmingham Chief of Police Bull Conner. Once in Memphis, McCollum and her father flew back to Nashville.

== Post-Freedom Rides ==
After her tenure with SNCC, McCollum took a job as a Day Care Center Director in Harlem for about twenty years. Then, she moved to Santa Fe, New Mexico where she trained dogs, rode horses, and traveled. In 2000, she moved back to Tennessee where she lived with her sister, Rhonda McCollum and family, in Nunnelly, Tennessee. She died on May 1, 2014.

Resources

The papers of Salynn McCollum are located at the Special Collections Library at Vanderbilt University.

== See also ==
- "He Was My Brother", a Simon & Garfunkel song about the Freedom Riders
