= Stanford Darger =

American politician and businessman (1920–2014)

Stanford Parley Darger (October 15, 1920 – May 7, 2014) was an American politician and businessman.

Born in Salt Lake City, Utah, Darger received his bachelor's degree in business and marketing from the University of Utah. He worked for General Electric and then owned Darger Ford in Magna, Utah. He served in the Utah House of Representatives from 1963 to 1972 as a Republican. He died in Salt Lake City, Utah.
