= Farid Akasheh =

Jordanian politician (1921–2014)

Farid Akasheh (1921 – 22 May 2014) was a Jordanian politician. He was born in Al Karak. From 1957 to 1965 he was director and chief surgeon of the Government Maternity and Gynaecology Hospital in Amman. He served as Minister of Social Affairs and Labor in 1967. He joined the cabinet of Prime Minister Ahmad Lozi on 21 August 1972 as Minister of Health. He kept this position until 1973.
