= Georges Delahaie =

French sculptor

Georges Delahaie received his diploma from l'École régionale des beaux-arts d'Angers and then furthered his studies at l'École nationale supérieure des Beaux-Arts de Paris where he received his diploma in 1957.

From his native Anjou and his studies at l'École régionale des beaux-arts d'Angers, he developed a weighted interest in the work and the craft as is seen in his countless sketches and models.

In Paris, he discovered Brancusi, Henry Moore, the energy of l'École des beaux-arts and the monumental works of the Atelier of Alfred Janniot.

After receiving his diploma, he liberated himself from the city and escaped to his Atelier and home in the countryside in Plouër-sur-Rance. From there, he accomplished his monumental works in copper, grès d'Erquy, pink granite, brass, aluminum and many bronzes. He sculpted the face of Marianne, a bronze measuring over a meter ten, which was commissioned by Étienne Pinte, the mayor of Versailles, for the great marriage hall in the city hall. His trophies were given for equestrian contests in Dinard and the Races at Branlebas. Certain of his objects were edited by Daum and by la Monnaie de Paris. His jewelry evokes an mythology both ancient and abstract.

Georges Delahaie was married to Claudine Demozay, they had a daughter named Eve.

He died on the 6th of May, 2014.
