= Anniston and Birmingham bus attacks =

Attack on civil rights protesters by the Ku Klux Klan in 1961

- Part of the Freedom Rides within the civil rights movement
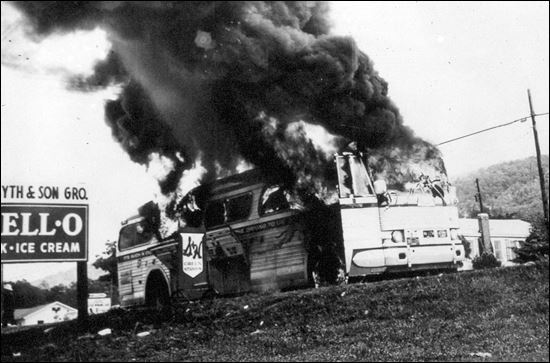
- A Greyhound bus burns after being firebombed by a mob outside of Anniston, Alabama. It had been carrying Freedom Riders, who all survived. The photograph, taken by Joe Postiglione, became a defining image of the civil rights movement.

- Anniston and Birmingham, Alabama (the United States)
- Location: 33.658124°N 85.83114°W; Anniston and Birmingham, Alabama
- Date: May 14, 1961; 65 years ago ~1:00 p.m. (UTC-5)
- Target: Freedom Riders
- Attack type: Arson; Mob violence Attempted lynching
- Injuries: 10–20
- Victims: Greyhound Bus: Joseph Perkins; Genevieve Hughes; Albert Bigelow; Hank Thomas; Jimmy McDonald; Mae Frances Moultrie; Ed Blankenheim; Charlotte Devree; Moses Newson Trailways Bus: James Peck; Charles Persons; Frances Bergman; Walter Bergman; Herman Harris; Ike Reynold; Ivor Moore; Simeon Booker; Theodore Gaffney Other victims: George Webb; Tommy Langston; Clancy Lake; L. B. Earle (Klansman beaten by accident)
- Perpetrators: BPD conspirators: Commissioner Eugene "Bull" Connor; Police Chief Jamie Moore; Police Sergeant Tom Cook; Detective Red Self Ku Klux Klan: Bobby Shelton; Gary Thomas Rowe Jr. (FBI informant); Kenneth Adams; William Chappell; Roger Couch; Jerome Couch; Cecil "Goober" Lewallyn; Hubert Page; Gene Reeves NSRP: Edward Reed Fields; J. B. Stoner
- No. of participants: 50–200
- Defenders: Alabama Highway Patrol: Ell Cowling; Harry Sims
- Motive: Racism and support for racial segregation

The Anniston and Birmingham bus attacks, which occurred on May 14, 1961, in Anniston and Birmingham, both Alabama, were acts of mob violence targeted against civil rights activists protesting against racial segregation in the Southern United States. They were carried out by members of the Ku Klux Klan and the National States' Rights Party in coordination with the Birmingham Police Department. The FBI did nothing to prevent the attacks despite having foreknowledge of the plans.

Although the United States Supreme Court had ruled in 1946 and 1960 that segregation on interstate public transport was unconstitutional, southern Jim Crow states continued to enforce it. To challenge this, the Congress of Racial Equality (CORE) organized for an interracial group of volunteers – whom they dubbed "Freedom Riders" – to travel together through the Deep South, hoping to provoke a violent reaction from segregationists that would force the federal government to step in. Traveling in two groups on Greyhound and Trailways bus lines, they would pass through the segregationist stronghold of Alabama, where Birmingham Police Commissioner Eugene "Bull" Connor conspired with local chapters of the Klan to attack the Riders.

On May 14, the Greyhound group was swarmed by a mob in Anniston. While police turned a blind eye, their bus was firebombed and the passengers physically assaulted. When armed Alabama Highway Patrol agents prevented the Freedom Riders from being lynched, the attackers dispersed and left the passengers to seek medical attention. The Trailways group reached Anniston approximately one hour later, where Klansmen assaulted the Riders and forced the black passengers to move to the back of the bus. They continued to Birmingham, where a mob of additional Klan members, armed with blunt weapons, attacked the Freedom Riders in a fifteen-minute frenzy of violence, during which the area was deliberately vacated by the police. Although there were no fatalities, several of the Riders – as well as a number of news reporters, multiple black bystanders, and a Klansman who was accidentally beaten by his own accomplices – required hospital treatment. After regrouping with the aid of Fred Shuttlesworth, most of the Freedom Riders opted to continue to New Orleans via plane, although some stayed in Birmingham in order to organize a new Freedom Ride with fresh recruits.

The attacks caused shock throughout the country and brought the issue of segregation under an international spotlight, embarrassing the United States during the height of the Cold War. By orchestrating them, Connor and the Klan had intended to deter future Rides, but they had the opposite effect and inspired hundreds of volunteers to spend the summer of 1961 traveling across the South facing arrest and mob violence. This galvanized public support and put immense pressure on President John Kennedy and Attorney General Robert Kennedy to act. In late September, the Interstate Commerce Commission issued regulations which effectively ended segregation in public transportation.

The Freedom Rides and the May 14 attacks brought CORE from a position of relative obscurity to the forefront of the national movement against white supremacy. They are considered a key event of the civil rights movement.

== Background ==
=== Congress of Racial Equality (1942) ===
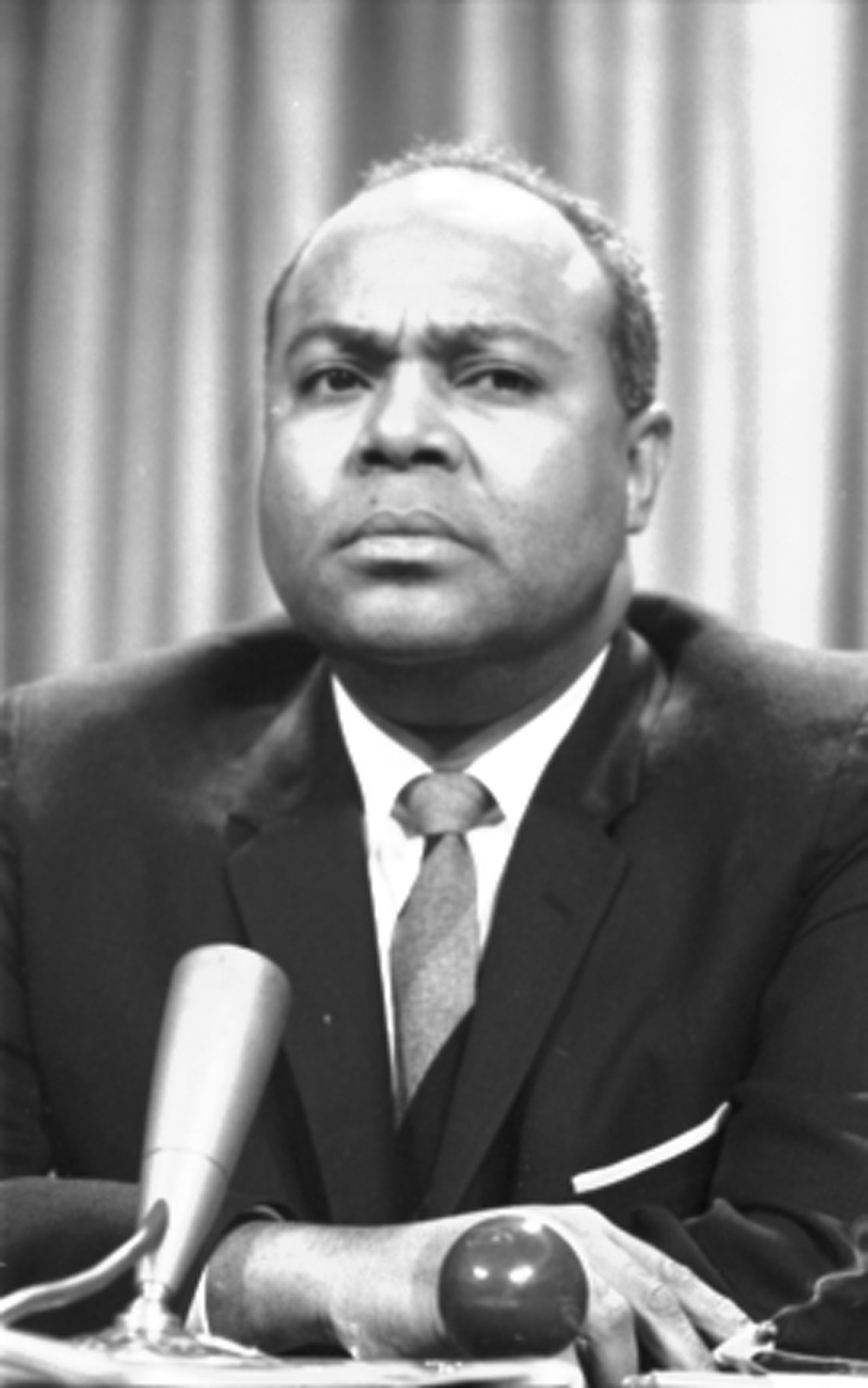
James Farmer, one of the lead figures in CORE and organizer of the 1961 Freedom Ride.

In 1942, James Farmer and other members of the pacifist organization Fellowship of Reconciliation (FOR) founded the Congress of Racial Equality (CORE). Influenced by Mahatma Gandhi and the Indian independence movement, they aimed to apply nonviolent principles to the struggle against racial discrimination in the United States. They utilized tactics such as sit-ins and boycotts.

=== Morgan v. Virginia (1946) ===
In Morgan v. Virginia (1946), the United States Supreme Court ruled that Virginia's state laws enforcing segregation on interstate public buses were unconstitutional. Despite this, bus companies and public officials in the former slave states ignored the ruling and de facto segregation largely continued, particularly in the Deep South.

=== Journey of Reconciliation (1947) ===
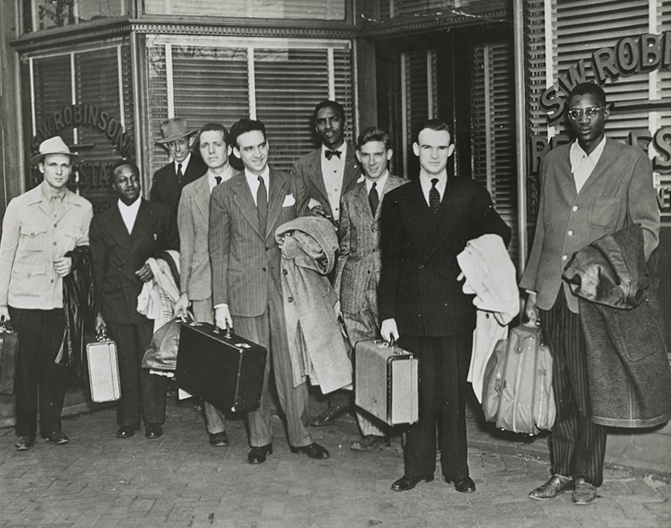
Participants in the 1947 Journey of Reconciliation, a forerunner to the Freedom Rides.

Intending to test how the 1946 Supreme Court ruling was being enforced in the Upper South, FOR member Bayard Rustin organized what he called a "Journey of Reconciliation" – now sometimes referred to as the "First Freedom Ride". In 1947, he organized for a group of sixteen FOR and CORE members (eight black and eight white) to travel through Virginia, North Carolina, Tennessee, and Kentucky on interstate buses. They split into two interracial groups so they would be able to test two major bus companies, Greyhound and Trailways.

The participants only faced one incidence of violence when James Peck – the only victim of the later Anniston/Birmingham attacks to take part in the Journey of Reconciliation – was punched in the head by a taxi driver. However, twelve were arrested for violating segregation and four – Rustin, Igal Roodenko, Joe Felmet, and Andrew Johnson – were sentenced to serve in chain gangs for periods ranging from 30 to 90 days.

Although it brought moderate publicity to the issue of segregation, the Journey did not change the status quo.

=== Boynton v. Virginia (1960) ===
In 1960, a second Supreme Court ruling, Boynton v. Virginia, extended the ban on segregation on interstate public buses to include the associated terminals and facilities, such as waiting rooms, lunch counters, and restrooms. Once again, states in the Deep South refused to comply and segregation continued.

== The Freedom Ride ==
=== Motivation ===
In early 1961, following the inauguration of John F. Kennedy, the southern civil rights movement was starting to lose the government's attention. Compared to the looming Bay of Pigs Invasion and other Cold War tensions, Kennedy's administration saw it as a minor annoyance rather than a pressing issue. After Martin Luther King Jr. was refused an invitation to a meeting between Kennedy and other civil rights leaders, he and James Farmer agreed that action needed to be taken in order to force the federal government to act.

Simultaneously, Farmer was receiving reports that segregation in interstate transport was continuing in the South, despite the recent Boynton v. Virginia ruling. He raised the issue at a CORE meeting, where Tom Gaither and Gordon Carey – who had been reading The Life of Mahatma Gandhi by Louis Fischer and was inspired by the Salt March – announced that they had been considering a revival of the 1947 Journey of Reconciliation.

Gandhi during the 1930 Salt March to abolish the British Salt Laws, which had a strong influence on CORE members.

Rebranded as a "Freedom Ride", it would be extended to cover states in the Deep South, where Farmer predicted it would be likely to provoke a violent response which President Kennedy would be unable to ignore. Despite its potential danger and high cost, the plan was received positively by CORE's National Action Committee, particularly by members who remembered the original 1947 Journey. They swiftly endorsed it.

Presenting the idea at an April 12 Student Nonviolent Coordinating Committee (SNCC) meeting – also attended by members of the Southern Christian Leadership Conference (SCLC), the National Student Association (NSA), the Southern Conference Educational Fund (SCEF), and the American Friends Service Committee (AFSC) – Gaither received a positive response. The SNCC approved a "Summer Action Program", which would involve encouraging black college students to exercise the rights given to them in Morgan and Boynton as they traveled home across the country at the end of the school term.

In mid-April, sixteen interracial members of CORE chapters in Missouri attempted to test Boynton by boarding a southbound bus in St. Louis. They only made it 150 miles before being arrested for entering a whites-only waiting room in Sikeston, failing to even make it out of the state. Later dubbed the "Little Freedom Ride", it was a sobering experience for CORE. In a letter to group leaders, Carey wrote "If bus protests end in arrest in Missouri, what can be expected when the Freedom Ride gets to Georgia and points South?"

=== Planning ===
==== Route ====
CORE decided on a route that would start on May 4 in Washington, D.C. and finish on May 17 (the seventh anniversary of the Brown v. Board of Education ruling) in New Orleans, Louisiana. It would pass through the states of Virginia, North Carolina, South Carolina, Georgia, Alabama, and Mississippi. As in 1947, the Riders would split into two groups in order to test both Greyhound and Trailways along each leg of the journey.

CORE expected the Freedom Ride to encounter increasing resistance as it ventured further into the South. In order to probe possible reactions, Gaither scouted the entire journey beforehand. He surveyed each stop's facilities and met with local black community leaders to arrange accommodation for the Riders. News of the plan elicited a mixed reaction but Gaither still successfully convinced dozens of organizations (ranging from Baptist congregations to private black colleges) to host the Riders and provide speaking engagements.

==== Seating arrangements ====
Segregation stipulated that black passengers sit in the back of the bus while white passengers sit in the front, with a firm divide in the middle. In order to intentionally violate this, at least one black Rider would sit in the front, and at least one interracial pair of Riders would sit on the same row. The rest of the Riders would spread out evenly, giving them a chance to inform regular passengers about the purpose of the Freedom Ride and the wider civil rights movement.

For each leg of the journey, one Rider would be assigned to strictly comply with segregation. If the rest of the group faced problems with the law, this designated "observer" was to avoid arrest and remain in contact with CORE, arranging for help if necessary.

==== Volunteers ====
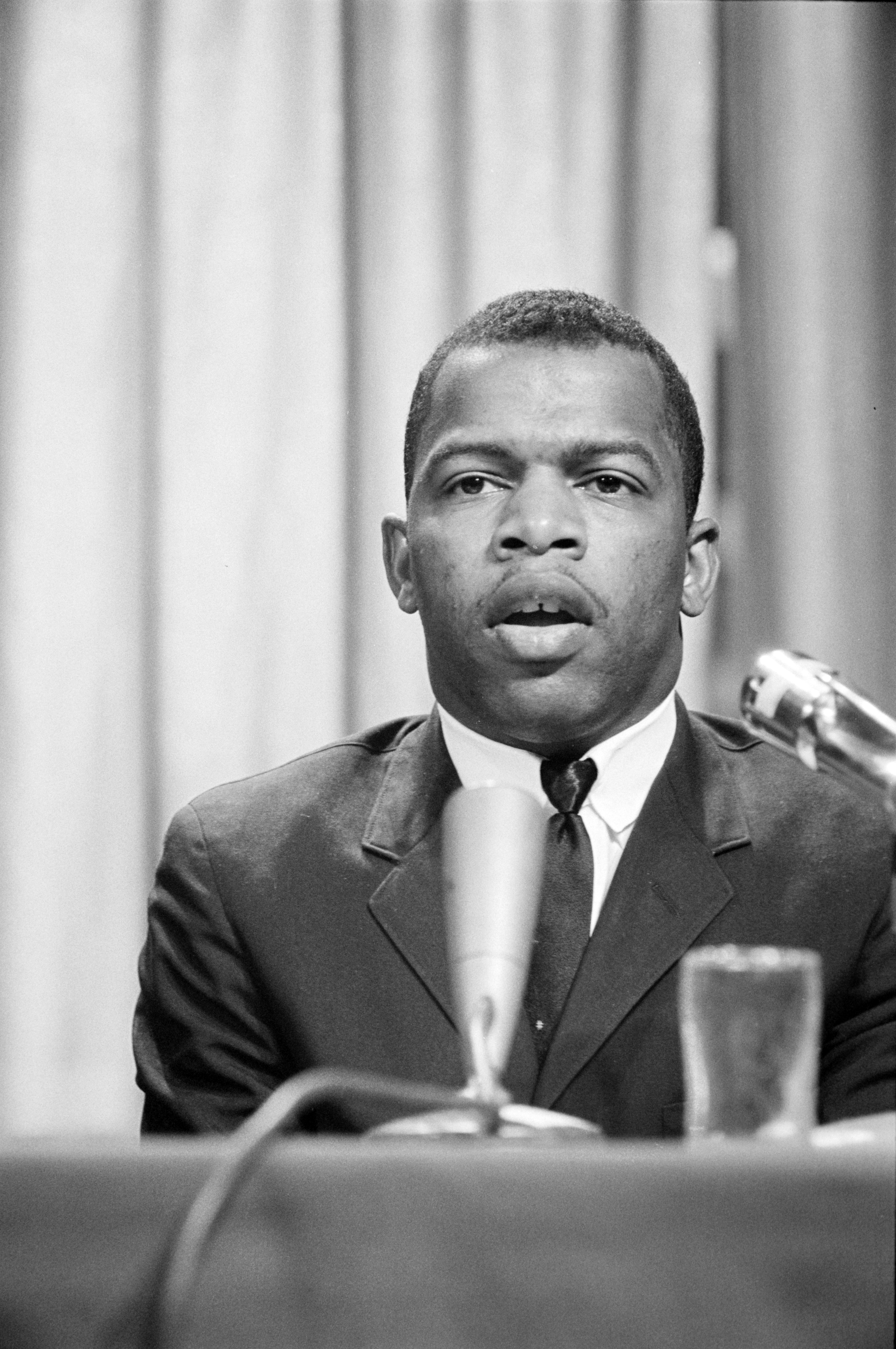
Freedom Rider John Lewis, who would go on to serve in the U.S. House of Representatives, was not present for the May 14 attacks.

CORE planned to recruit an interracial group of twelve to fourteen seasoned activists. All applicants were made aware of the serious risks involved and those under twenty-one had to receive parental permission. All had to demonstrate prior commitment to nonviolence and provide a recommendation from a teacher, pastor, or coworker.

Before departure, they would all undergo a week of intensive training. They would receive a crash course on Constitutional Law from a lawyer (mainly on what to say and do if arrested) and another on the culture of the white South from a sociologist. They would also spend three days carrying out intense role-play exercises intended to simulate the harassment that they could potentially face in the South. This involved the volunteers hurling verbal racial abuse at each other, as well as pouring drinks on and spitting on each other.

Each Rider would be required to follow a strict dress code: coats and ties for men, dresses and high heels for women. They would all be urged to bring a toothbrush, toothpaste, and a few books, in case of arrest. Recommended reading included Gandhi and Henry David Thoreau.

Farmer selected himself and James Peck as the first two Riders. Despite his inexperience with frontline activism, Farmer hoped to catapult himself to the front of the civil rights movement. Peck, born into a wealthy family that owned the Peck & Peck clothing retailer, was an obvious choice – he had taken part in the 1947 Journey of Reconciliation and spent three years in prison for being a conscientious objector during World War II. For the rest of the Riders, CORE attempted to find a balance between black and white, young and old, religious and secular, and Northern and Southern. However, in order to minimize the possibility of women being exposed to violence, the number of men was deliberately kept higher. There was also concerns that too many interracial, intersex couples would dangerously taunt segregationists with the suggestion of interracial sex and miscegenation. This decision was controversial.

CORE selected fourteen volunteers in addition to Farmer and Peck. Four of these (J. Metz Rollins, Julia Aaron, Jerome Smith, and John Moody) were all unable to attend for various reasons, and Hank Thomas was found as a last minute replacement for Moody. Four more Riders (Herman Harris, Ivor Moore, Mae Frances Moultrie, and Ike Reynolds) would join the group in Sumter, South Carolina, while three of the Riders (Farmer, John Lewis, and Benjamin Elton Cox) would leave the group before reaching Alabama. A total of fourteen Riders would be present during the May 14 attacks.

Below is a full list of those who took part in the May 4 to May 14 Freedom Ride:

| Freedom Rider | Age | Skin Colour | Departed From Washington D.C. | Joined in Sumter, S.C. | On Greyhound bus during attack | On Trailways bus during attack | Notes |
|---|---|---|---|---|---|---|---|
| Bergman, Frances | 57 | White | Yes | No | No | Yes | With her husband Walter, Frances was a committed socialist who took part in Detroit activism. |
| Bergman, Walter | 61 | White | Yes | No | No | Yes | Former elementary school teacher from Michigan who spent time in post-war Germany. |
| Bigelow, Albert | 55 | White | Yes | No | Yes | No | A former Navy captain and WWII veteran, Bigelow was a founding member of the Committee for Non-Violent Action who gained notoriety for captaining the Golden Rule protest ship. |
| Blankenheim, Ed | 27 | White | Yes | No | Yes | No | A student at the University of Arizona, Blankenheim had volunteered for the Marines at the age of 16 and served in the Korean War. He became involved with CORE after joining Tucson's NAACP Youth Council. |
| Cox, Benjamin Elton | 29 | Black | Yes | No | No | No | A Reverend who spent time in various parts of the Eastern Seaboard, he became active in the NAACP in High Point, North Carolina. He wore a full clerical collar for the ride, inferred as symbolising divine guidance. |
| Farmer, James | 41 | Black | Yes | No | No | No | Co-founder of CORE and leader of the Freedom Riders. Farmer would leave the group before reaching Alabama. |
| Harris, Herman | 21 | Black | No | Yes | No | Yes | Joining the riders in Sumter, North Carolina, Harris was a student at Morris College, where he was president of the local CORE chapter. |
| Hughes, Genevieve | 28 | White | Yes | No | Yes | No | From the affluent suburb of Chevy Chase, Washington, D.C., Hughes became increasingly active in CORE during the 1950s after becoming disillusioned with her Wall Street job. |
| Lewis, John | 21 | Black | Yes | No | No | No | Born on a farm in Pike County, Alabama, Lewis was already a veteran of the nonviolent movement by the time of the Freedom Ride. He would go on to become a United States House Representative. |
| McDonald, Jimmy | 29 | Black | Yes | No | Yes | No | A singer from New York City known for labor and freedom songs. Although considered somewhat of a loose cannon, he provided entertainment and comic relief for the Riders. |
| Moore, Ivor "Jerry" | 19 | Black | No | Yes | No | Yes | Joining the riders in Sumter, North Carolina, Moore, originally from the Bronx, was a student at Morris College. |
| Moultrie, Mae Frances | 24 | Black | No | Yes | Yes | No | Joining the riders in Sumter, North Carolina, Moultrie was a senior at Morris College and a veteran of sit-ins and marches. |
| Peck, James | 46 | White | Yes | No | No | Yes | A rider on the 1947 Journey of Reconciliation and activism veteran, Peck was the Riders' secondary leader after Farmer. |
| Perkins, Joseph | 27 | Black | Yes | No | Yes | No | From Owensboro, Kentucky, Perkins spent time in the army before becoming involved in activism at the University of Michigan. He was eventually recruited to organise direct action campaigns for CORE. |
| Person, Charles | 18 | Black | Yes | No | No | Yes | Although mathematically gifted, Person was denied admission to the all-white Georgia Institute of technology. He served sixteen days in jail for his part in a sit-in, drawing him to CORE's attention. |
| Reynolds, Ike | 27 | Black | No | Yes | No | Yes | Joining the riders in Sumter, North Carolina, Reynolds was a CORE activist studying at Wayne State University. |
| Thomas, Hank | 19 | Black | Yes | No | Yes | No | An attendee of the Student Nonviolent Coordinating Committee's founding conference, Thomas grew up in an abusive and impoverished home in rural Florida and was well acquainted with the Jim Crow south. |

=== The Freedom Ride begins ===
On May 4, thirteen Riders set out from the Greyhound and Trailways bus stations in Washington, D.C. to modest fanfare.

The only press covering the departure were three reporters from the Associated Press, The Washington Post, and the Washington Evening Star. However, accompanying the Riders on the journey to New Orleans were black journalists Simeon Booker (writer for Jet and Ebony), Charlotte Devree (freelance writer), and Theodore Gaffney (freelance photographer). Moses Newson (for the Baltimore Afro-American) would also join the group in Greensboro, North Carolina.

Booker, at Farmer's request, arranged to have a meeting with United States Attorney General Robert F. Kennedy, during which he informed him of the imminent Freedom Rider. However, Booker stated that Kennedy seemed distracted throughout the meeting and did not appear to grasp the gravity of the situation. This was confirmed after the attacks when Kennedy claimed to have been blindsided by the Freedom Ride.

==== From Washington to Georgia ====
The buses left the capital without interference and only suffered minor problems in the Upper South. Joseph Perkins became the first member of the group to be arrested after he requested a shoeshine from a whites-only shoeshine chair in Charlotte, North Carolina. He rejoined the group after two days in jail and the incident was jokingly referred to as the first "shoe-in".

In Rock Hill, South Carolina, John Lewis and Albert Bigelow were attacked by two men when they tried to enter a whites-only waiting room. Genevieve Hughes was also pushed to the floor during the altercation.

That night, while staying at Rock Hill's Friendship Junior College, Lewis received a telegram from the AFSC informing him that he was a finalist for a coveted foreign service internship. To make the final interview in Philadelphia, Pennsylvania, he decided to temporarily leave the Freedom Ride. His plan was to rejoin the others in Alabama on the May 15. As a result, he was not present for the attacks on May 14.

In Winnsboro, South Carolina, Peck and Thomas were arrested when trying to use a segregated food counter. Following his release, Thomas narrowly avoided a lynch mob, being saved at the last moment by a local black minister who provided a lift in his car.

Shortly after arriving in Sumter, South Carolina, Cox took a leave of absence, having made a prior commitment to deliver a sermon in High Point, North Carolina. With the group down by two black members, Farmer accepted an offer to have the group joined by four students, three from Morris College and one visiting from Wayne State University. The new Freedom Riders were Herman Harris, Ivor Moore, Mae Frances Moultrie, and Ike Reynolds.

As the Riders reached Atlanta, Georgia, they were greeted by cheering students. That evening, they dined with King, who heaped praise upon them. However, he privately warned Farmer that there was hints of a plot that would be carried out against them in Alabama.

Later that night, while staying at Atlanta University, Farmer was informed that his ill father had died. After overcoming a "confusion of emotions", Farmer made a reluctant choice to return to Washington, D.C. for the funeral. Planning to rejoin the Ride a few days later, he left Perkins to take over his duties. Farmer left the group on the morning of May 14, which meant he was not present when the buses were attacked later that day in Alabama.

== Preparations for the Freedom Ride in Alabama ==
On 14 May, that year's Mother's Day, the buses were set travel from Atlanta into Alabama, a Ku Klux Klan stronghold with a reputation for its hardcore segregationist attitude. The state's governor, John M. Patterson, had won his 1958 election on a segregationist platform. When a veteran of the 1947 Journey of Reconciliation attempted to test the state's adherence to the Boynton ruling, they were arrested twice and threaten with violence multiple times.

During Gaither's preliminary scout of the route, he had worried that the Riders would be lucky to escape the state with their lives. He identified the two Alabama cities of Anniston and Birmingham as potential sites of violence.

=== Anniston ===
Anniston was a small military city serving nearby Fort McClellan. It was rife with racial tension, and had already been the site of violence on January 2, when Talladega College student Art Bacon was viciously beaten after he sat in a whites-only waiting room at the city's railway station. Although the city had a strong NAACP branch, it was also home to some of the most belligerent Klansmen in the country.

Gaither had called Anniston "a very explosive trouble spot without a doubt."

=== Birmingham ===
The much larger hub of Birmingham was equally daunting for the Riders. King would later go on to describe it as "the most segregated city in America". It temporarily earned the sobriquet Bombingham due to over forty dynamite attacks that were carried out against African-Americans and civil rights activists between 1947 and 1965. In March, local activist Fred Shuttlesworth had warned that the city was "a racial powder keg that would explode if local white supremacists were unduly provoked, especially by outsiders".

==== Eugene "Bull" Connor ====
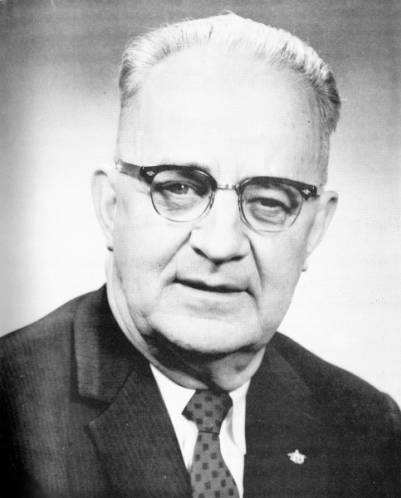
Eugene "Bull" Connor, the white supremacist Commissioner of Public Safety in Birmingham, Alabama, who conspired with the Ku Klux Klan to attack the Freedom Riders.

In charge of the Birmingham Police Department (BPD) was the white supremacist Commissioner of Public Safety Eugene "Bull" Connor. By 1961, he had already earned a reputation as a zealous supporter of segregation. In 1938, Eleanor Roosevelt drew his ire when she defied his orders to sit with other whites at a public meeting. During the 1948 Democratic National Convention, he helped lead the Alabama delegation in a walkout when the party included a civil rights plank in its platform.

=== Police and Ku Klux Klan planning ===
Although press reports alerted the wider Klan to the approaching Freedom Ride, the Alabama Knights (a breakaway faction of the larger U.S. Klans) had been aware of it since mid-April. Police Sergeant Tom Cook, a fervent Klan supporter, passed on information that had been forwarded to the BPD by the Federal Bureau of Investigation (FBI). This included details of the entire route, city-by-city.

Throughout late April and early May, members of the Klan and the BPD held meetings where they conspired to attack the Freedom Ride and effectively bring it to a halt. Details of the Klan's plan were passed on to the FBI by informant Gary Thomas Rowe Jr., a member of Eastview Klavern #13.

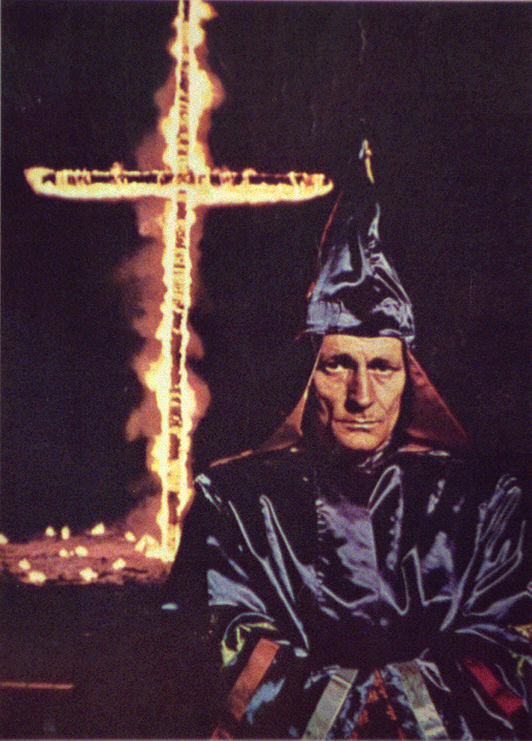
Robert Shelton, Imperial Wizard of the Alabama Knights faction of the Ku Klux Klan, a main organizer of the attacks.

At a clandestine meeting arranged by Klan member Hubert Page, Connor assured Robert "Bobby" Shelton, the Imperial Wizard of the Alabama Knights, that the Klan would be given a fifteen-minute window in which the police would turn a blind eye to attacks on the Freedom Riders. Likewise, Cook told Rowe:

We're gonna allow you fifteen minutes....You can beat 'em, bomb 'em, maim 'em, kill 'em. I don't give a shit. There will be absolutely no arrests. You can assure every Klansman in the country that no one will be arrested in Alabama for that fifteen minutes.

In the final days leading up to May 14, the Klan finalized their plan. To begin with, Anniston Klaverns, led by Kenneth Adams and William Chappell, would engage the Riders in Anniston. They would be responsible for ensuring that the Riders did not enter the bus stations. Following this initial assault, a second "mop-up action" would be carried out in Birmingham. One half of sixty handpicked Klansmen, encouraged to bring blunt weapons such as bats and clubs, would be assigned to the bus stations, while the other half would wait as a reserve force at a nearby hotel. Connor advised the Klan that they should find an excuse to start an altercation, for example, by having a Klansman pour coffee on himself and blame a Freedom Rider. Another suggestion was that if black Riders entered a white restroom, Klansmen should beat them and steal their clothes. This would force the Rider to leave the restroom undressed, allowing police to arrest them for public indecency.

=== FBI foreknowledge of the attacks ===
Due to Rowe's information, FBI director J. Edgar Hoover was aware of the plan to attack the Freedom Ride from at least May 5. Despite this, he forwarded limited information to United States Attorney General Robert F. Kennedy and others at the United States Department of Justice. The FBI did inform Birmingham Police Chief Jamie Moore, although they suspected that he was already aware and sympathetic to the Klan's plan. At no point was anyone within the civil rights movement, including the Riders themselves, informed about the impending attack.

Hoover would later blame Kennedy for the backlash against the attacks, stating that the Justice Department should have issued specific instructions if they wished for the Riders to be protected. However, Kennedy and others in Washington, D.C. merely saw this as a cover for the FBI's hostility to civil rights.

In 1977, Walter Bergman, who was paralyzed for life by a stroke caused by the attacks, successfully sued the FBI for allowing them to happen.

== Attack on the Greyhound bus ==
=== Riders leave Georgia for Alabama ===
On May 14, the Freedom Riders left Atlanta on westbound buses heading to Birmingham. Before leaving, Peck held a phone conversation with Shuttlesworth, who had heard rumours of a mob. Peck calmly informed his fellow Riders and stressed that he did not expect any problems before reaching Birmingham. This would give them four hours to plan a nonviolent response to the mob, assuming it existed.

The Greyhound bus left first at 11 a.m. In addition to seven Riders – Bigelow, Blankenheim, Hughes, McDonald, Moultrie, Perkins (team leader), and Thomas – and two journalists – Devree and Newson – the bus was also carrying five regular passengers. Unbeknownst to the Riders, among them were Roy Robinson, manager of the Atlanta Greyhound station, and two plainclothes agents of the Alabama Highway Patrol, Ell Cowling and Harry Sims. The latter two were there to eavesdrop on behalf of Governor Patterson.

The mood was tense as the bus crossed from Georgia into Alabama. After passing the small town of Heflin, the bus driver, O. T. Jones, was informed by the driver of an eastbound bus that a mob was waiting in Anniston. Perkins urged the driver to continue, hoping the story was exaggerated.

=== Mob in Anniston ===
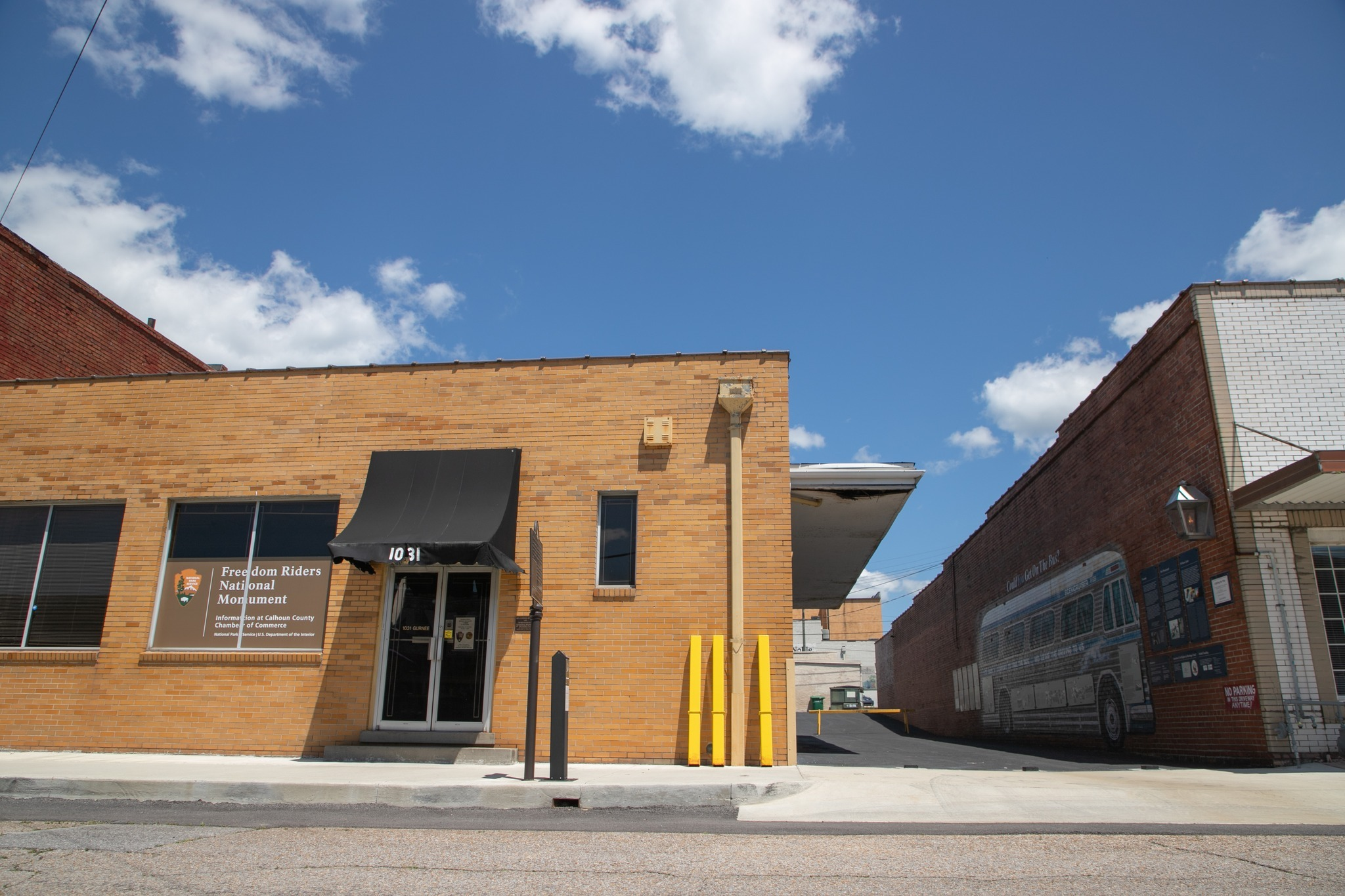
The former Greyhound bus terminal in Anniston. The bus was attacked as it stopped in the adjacent alleyway.

The bus arrived at Anniston and had just pulled up next to the Greyhound station when it was abruptly swarmed by a mob of about fifty Ku Klux Klansmen. Led by Chappell, many were armed with pipes, clubs, chains, and other weapons. Hughes claimed to have witnessed one man brandishing a gun. The Klansmen were wearing regular clothing – rather than the infamous Klan hoods and robes – and many were dressed in their Sunday best, having come straight from church. As Klansman Roger Couch spread himself in front of the bus to prevent it from leaving, others started smashing the windows, denting the sides, and slashing the tires. Cowling and Sims were forced out of cover as they rushed to the front of the bus to lock the doors and prevent the attackers from entering. The other passengers were trapped in a state of terror as the mob hurled verbal abuse at them.

After about twenty minutes, Anniston police turned up. Appearing to be friendly with members of the mob and making no effort to arrest anyone, officers made a pretense of clearing the crowd and directing the bus to leave the station. Eager to get the bus and its riders out of their jurisdiction, Anniston police escorted the bus west to the city limits, where they abandoned it to a pursuing convoy of Klan-filled vehicles.

=== Bus burned outside of Anniston ===
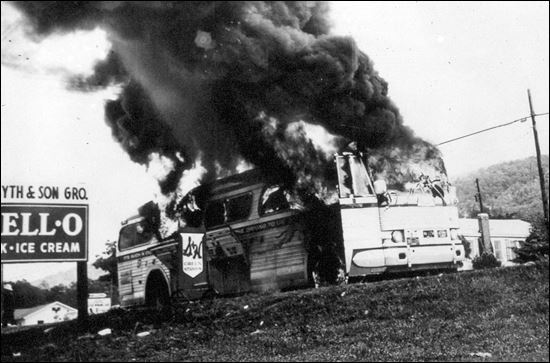
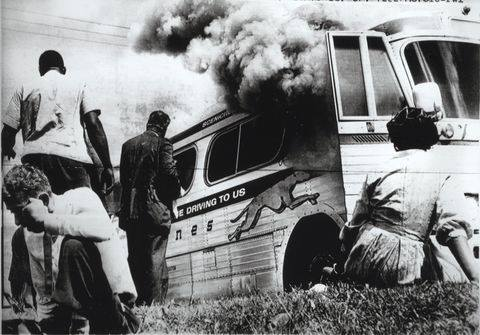
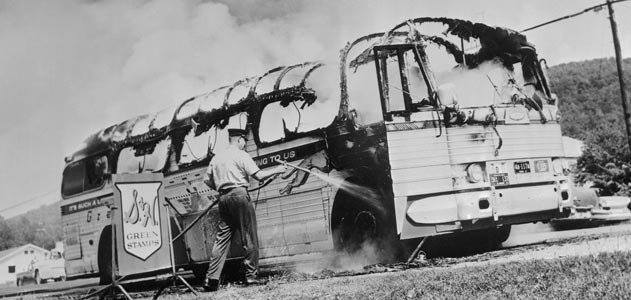
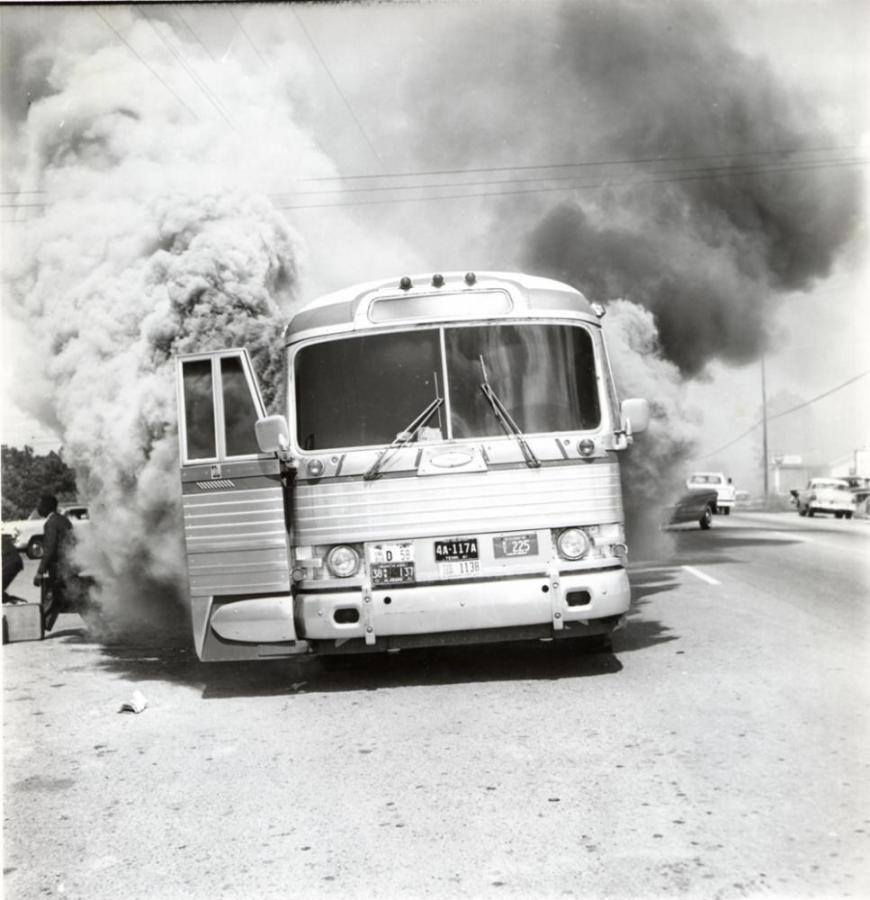
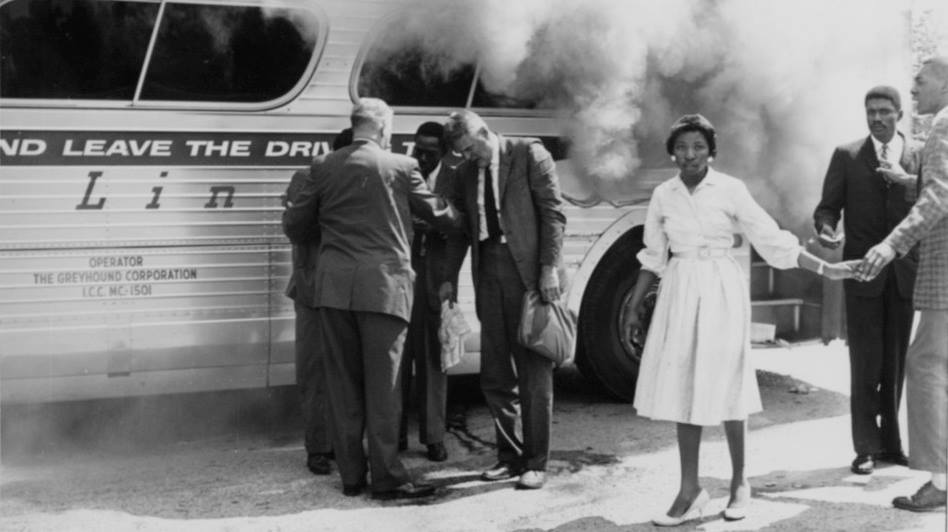
The Greyhound bus burns after being firebombed by a Ku Klux Klan mob outside of Anniston, Alabama. The woman in the light dress in the bottom photograph is Mae Frances Moultrie.

The slashed tires forced the bus to stop several miles west of Anniston (where Alabama State Route 202 meets the end of the Old Birmingham Highway), at which point Jones opened the door and ran out of the bus. Sources differ on whether he left in an attempt to find replacement tires from a nearby store or if he simply abandoned the Riders in order to save his own life. Cowling had just enough time to retrieve his revolver from the luggage compartment and reboard the bus before it was once again surrounded by a furious mob. In addition to the Klansmen, the commotion had attracted a number of local residents and journalists; somewhere between thirty and fifty vehicles (possibly carrying up to two hundred people) were in pursuit of the bus when it stopped.

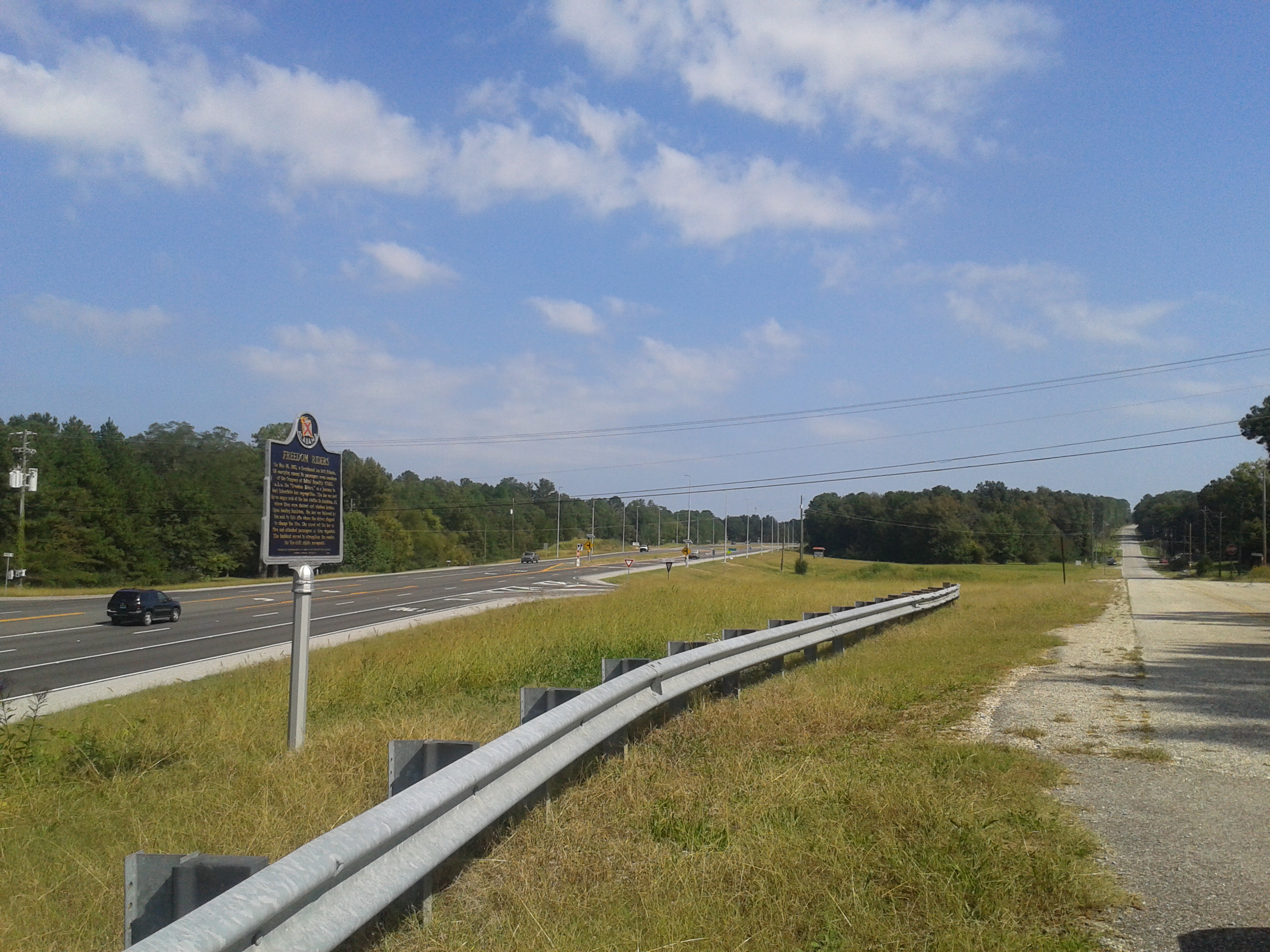
2017 photograph of the roadside location where the Greyhound bus was burned.

Chappell and the mob resumed the attack, smashing the remaining windows and rocking the bus in an attempt to tip it on its side. Other Klansmen attempted to board it, but were prevented from doing so by Cowling. At some point, two more Alabama Highway Patrol agents appeared on the scene, but they made no attempt to halt the violence.

Growing impatient, Couch and fellow Klansman Cecil Lewallyn retrieved a bundle of incendiary materials from Lewallyn's car, which they set alight and tossed into the back of the bus. Black smoke soon filled the inside as it started to go up in flames. While some passengers started climbing out of broken windows, others attempted to get out the front entrance, but Klansmen – screaming taunts such as "Burn them alive" and "Fry the goddamn niggers" – held it shut. Eventually, the mob was forced back (sources differ on whether this was due to an exploding fuel tank or the threat of Cowling's gun) and the remaining Riders were able to exit the bus.

=== The mob retreats ===
The passengers, many suffering from smoke inhalation, stumbled out of the bus. Moultrie was later unable to recall if she had walked off the bus, crawled off it, or been carried out by someone. The mob continued their harassment, and one man feigned concern toward Thomas before hitting him in the head with a baseball bat. Thomas remained semi-conscious for the rest of the attack.

The Klansmen were permanently forced back to a firm perimeter after Cowling and the other Highway Patrol agents fired a number of warning shots, signalling that a mass lynching was out of the question. The agents stood guard around the bleeding and coughing passengers as members of the mob gradually lost interest and dispersed.

Although many local bystanders encouraged the mob, not all were hostile to the Riders. Twelve-year-old Janie Forsyth supplied the Riders with water from a bucket she refilled multiple times. Her act of compassion caused the family to be ostracized and they eventually left Anniston. Another local couple drove Genevieve Hughes (who had been at the back of the bus when it was firebombed) to Anniston Memorial Hospital. The other Riders were taken to the hospital by ambulance, although only after their racial solidarity (and persuasive efforts from Cowling) convinced the paramedics to also accept the black members of the group.

=== Rescue from Anniston Hospital ===
As the afternoon wore on, a crowd of Klansmen grew around the hospital, threatening to burn it to the ground if it continued to harbor the Freedom Riders. Having already struggled to receive care from Anniston's prejudiced staff and inadequate facilities, Perkins was informed by the hospital that he and the Riders would not be allowed to spend the night. Perkins placed frantic calls to CORE contacts in D.C. and was put in touch with Shuttlesworth, who organized for several cars of local black activists to launch a rescue mission. Led by Colonel Stone Johnson and openly armed with shotguns, the activists held back the mob of Klansmen as the Riders were shuffled from the hospital into the rescue cars. During the ride to Birmingham, the Riders pressed their rescuers for an update on the other Riders, but there was little information other than that the Trailways group had also been attacked upon reaching Anniston.

== Attack on the Trailways bus ==
=== Leaving Georgia ===
Back in Atlanta, the departure of the Greyhound group had left the remaining Freedom Riders – the Bergmans, Harris, Moore, Peck (team leader), Person, and Reynolds – and the other two journalists – Booker and Gaffney – to board a Trailways bus for the next leg next of the trip to Birmingham. However, among the other regular passengers were a number of covert Alabama Klansman. As soon as the bus left the terminal in Atlanta, they started to make racially abusive threats to the Riders. These intensified as the bus crossed into Alabama.

=== Violence in Anniston ===
The bus reached the Trailways station in Anniston about one hour after the Greyhound bus had arrived in the city. While the bus driver, John Olan Patterson, spoke to some police officers, the Riders nervously bought some sandwiches from the whites-only lunch counter. They were served, although the other whites in the waiting room averted their eyes.

When they got back on the bus, the Riders were bluntly informed by Patterson that a mob had just set a desegregated bus on fire and that they would all have to segregate to avoid the same fate. As Patterson spoke, he was flanked by the covert Klansmen and a number of others who had joined them in Anniston. After a brief silence, one of the Riders stated that they had a right to sit wherever they wished. This prompted the Klansmen to start physically beating Harris and Person, the two black men in the front of the bus. When the Klansmen did not stop, Peck and Walter Bergman objected. This caused the Klansmen to turn on them instead, and they were both beaten unconscious. One of the cooler-headed Klansmen had to restrain the others from beating Bergman to death.

The Klansmen dragged the half-conscious Riders to the back of the bus, after which they took their own seats at the front. One of the regular passengers, a black woman, begged the Klansmen to let her off, but they refused and called her racial slurs. The bus was then surveyed by Patterson and a police officer, who both appeared satisfied with the situation. The police officer made it clear that he was on the Klan's side, stating "I ain't seen a thing".

=== Anniston to Birmingham ===
==== On the bus ====
Directed by the police officer, Patterson drove the bus out from the Trailways terminal. He started taking a detour through back roads when it became clear that a mob had assembled on the main highway. The Klansmen on board the bus did not object to this, puzzling the somewhat relieved Freedom Riders. They were not aware that they were being saved for another mob which would be awaiting them in Birmingham.

During the two-hour journey to Birmingham, the Klansmen heckled the Riders, brandishing weapons and implying an ill fate awaited them in Birmingham. One of them took Booker's latest copy of Jet, featuring an article on CORE and the Freedom Rides. Reading it infuriated the Klansmen further.

==== Preparations in Birmingham ====
Meanwhile, in downtown Birmingham, the assembled mob of Klansman was waiting by the Greyhound bus terminal, where they were still expecting the first bus. Minutes before the Trailways bus was due to arrive, Police Sergeant Cook placed a call to Rowe, alerting him to the situation. Rowe herded the Klansmen together and led them on a manic dash to the Trailways bus terminal, some three or four blocks away. Years later, Rowe would describe the scene:

We made an astounding sight . . . men running and walking down the streets of Birmingham on Sunday afternoon carrying chains, sticks, and clubs. Everything was deserted; no police officers were to be seen except one on a street corner. He stepped off and let us go by, and we barged into the bus station and took it over like an army of occupation. There were Klansmen in the waiting room, in the rest rooms, in the parking area.

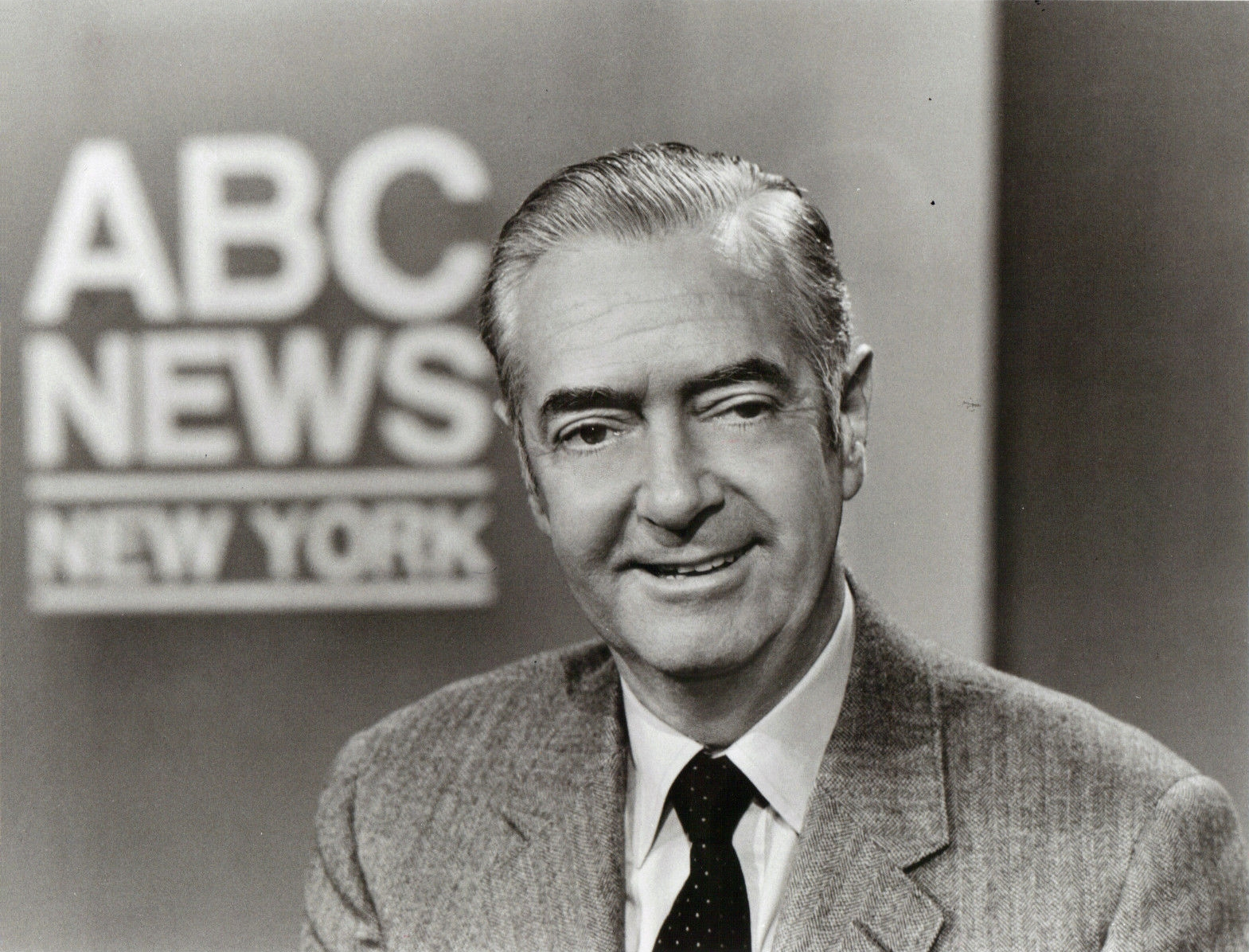
Journalist Howard K. Smith (at that time working for CBS News) would witness part of the attack against the Freedom Riders in Birmingham.

Due to the agreement made with the BPD, the law enforcement presence at the terminal was nonexistent; no police would turn up until fifteen minutes after the Riders arrived. However, several reporters were on the scene, having been tipped off that something was about to happen. Among them were Howard K. Smith of CBS News, who received a phone call the night before from Edward Reed Fields, president of the white supremacist National States' Rights Party (NSRP). Although Klan member Page had warned Fields and the NSRP to stay away from the attack, Fields and fellow extremist J. B. Stoner still turned up in Birmingham with several other party members. Cook was reportedly keen for the Klan and NSRP to work together.

Connor spent the day at city hall, trying to distance himself from the violence that was about to take place. His Methodist pastor and a number of other friends attempted to convince him to call the attack off, but to no avail.

=== Violence in Birmingham ===
The Trailways bus reached the crowded terminal in Birmingham at approximately 4:15 p.m. The Klansmen onboard rushed off to lose themselves in the mob, leaving the beaten Riders to decide whether they would test the facilities. Peck and Person, the designated testers for the Atlanta–Birmingham leg, and a number of the other Riders walked past the several Klansmen gathered outside the station and went into the whites-only waiting room.

==== Peck and Person beaten ====
The inside of the waiting room was full of Klansmen, newsmen (including Smith), and other witnesses. As Peck and Person entered, someone in the mob pointed to Peck's injuries and claimed that Person deserved to die for attacking a white man. When Peck protested that Person was not responsible, the waiting room erupted into chaos. Some of the Klansmen, including Eastview member Gene Reeves, tried to force Person into the colored waiting room. Another group, including Fields and Rowe, attacked Peck. The two Riders were eventually thrown into a dark corridor, where the attackers, some armed with pipes and other weapons, continued to pummel them away from the eyes of the newsmen. Perkins was eventually able to escape in the confusion and left the bus station to make contact with Shuttlesworth. Peck was beaten unconscious (for the second time that day) and left lying in his own blood. He would require over fifty stitches.

==== Other Riders attempt to flee ====
The other Riders who had entered the waiting room behind Peck and Person attempted to leave the terminal, but their way was blocked by the mob. Harris and Moore were somehow able to get lost in the crowd and slip away. Frances Bergman, at Walter's insistence, had boarded a city bus taking her away from the violence. Walter himself was beaten again for the second time that day; his injuries would cause him to suffer a stroke a week later, leaving him paralyzed for the rest of his life. Reynolds was also violently attacked, and his semi-conscious body was thrown into a bin.

Booker entered the terminal just in time to see Bergman crawling on his hands and knees through the mob. He rushed back out and located a black cab driver who rushed him and Gaffney to Shuttlesworth's house.

==== Bystanders and reporters attacked ====
The Riders were not the only victims of the mob's violence. A twenty-nine-year-old black laborer named George Webb was at the terminal to meet his fiancée, Mary Spicer, who had been one of the regular passengers on the bus. Unaware of what was going on inside the terminal, they had entered the baggage room to discover a mob of Klansmen and NSRP members, including Rowe and Page. Although they let Spicer leave, they mercilessly set themselves upon Webb, beating him with fists, pipes, and a bat. The attack was witnessed by Tommy Langston of the Birmingham Post-Herald, who snapped a photograph with his flashbulb camera, seen below:

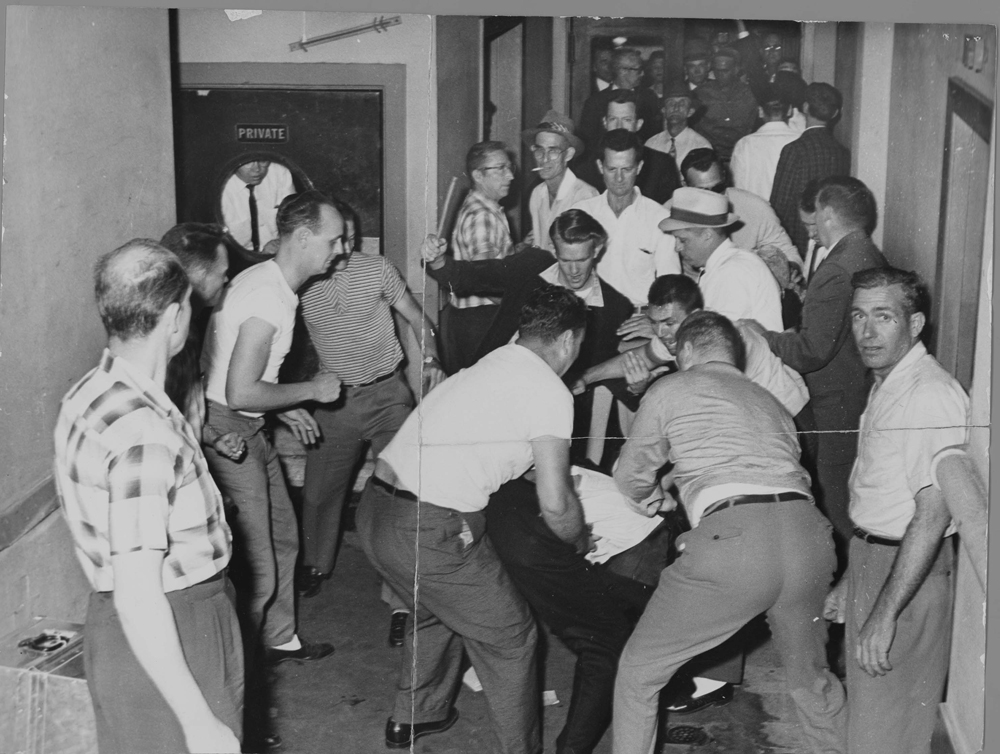
Black bystander George Webb is beaten by members of the Ku Klux Klan in Birmingham, Alabama. The man on the right with his back to the camera is FBI informant Gary Thomas Rowe Jr. The photograph (often misidentified as a photograph of the attack on Peck) was taken by Tommy Langston of the Birmingham Post-Herald, who was chased and beaten by the mob moments after.

The flash diverted the mob's attention away from Webb, who was able to reunite with Spicer and escape. The attackers chased Langston out into the terminal's car park, where they smashed his camera and subjected him to numerous kicks and punches. Langston then staggered to the Post-Herald office and alerted his colleagues to the transpiring events. Another photographer was sent to the scene, where he discovered Langston's broken camera. When he returned to the office, he and Langston were amazed to discover that the film had survived the attack. Rowe's FBI handlers would be furious that he allowed himself to be captured on film taking part in the attack.

The photograph was published on the paper's front page the next day, although it initially misidentified the victim as Peck, rather than Webb. It was one of the only pieces of evidence to survive the riot. After attacking Langston, Klansmen destroyed the film in the cameras belonging to Birmingham News photographers Bud Gordon and Tom Lankford. Clancy Lake, a WAPI reporter broadcasting live over the radio, had his vehicle smashed up and his microphone ripped out.

In the chaos, the mob even attacked one of their own. Klansman L. B. Earle happened to be using the restroom when the Riders arrived at the terminal. As he exited the men's room, members of the mob mistook him for a Freedom Rider and beat him so severely that he later required hospital treatment.

==== The police arrive ====
After the allotted fifteen minutes, the Klansmen started to disperse as police officers belatedly appeared on the scene. No one was arrested. The attackers were forewarned that their time was up by plainclothes detective Red Self, although he struggled to persuade Rowe and Page to leave the scene, as they were both so engrossed in the violence. Many of the Klansmen were given lifts away from the terminal by Imperial Wizard Shelton.

Following a celebration at the former's house, Rowe, Page and other Klansmen went into a black neighborhood to continue their night of violence. They got into a fight with a group of black youths who hospitalized one of them and gave Rowe a serious (but non-lethal) neck wound.

== Aftermath ==
=== Reactions ===
==== National ====
The intensity of the violence and the attackers' brazen disregard for the law caused shock across the country, especially in the North. The reaction was exactly what CORE had hoped for, and Reverend Cox would later declare: "It proved what we set out to prove – that American citizens cannot travel freely in the United States". Overnight, CORE was transformed from a relatively minor player in the civil rights movement to a titan holding equal sway with SNCC, SCLC, and the NAACP. It would soon have chapters in every major northern city.

Smith's eyewitness account of the Birmingham mob violence was broadcast on CBS, while photographs of the burning Greyhound bus and Langston's shot of the attack on Webb were published nationwide in newspapers. Shuttlesworth was amazed when local reporters he considered to be pro-segregation published critical accounts of the attacks; the front page of The Birmingham News was headlined "People Are Asking: 'Where Were The Police?'" Across the country, The New York Times ran an article on Smith's account and covered the attacks on the front page, while The Wall Street Journal was told by a leading Birmingham businessman that the attacks had given his city a "black eye". Farmer was inspired to design a new CORE logo when he saw a photograph of the burning bus on the front page of The Washington Post.

News of the attacks infuriated President Kennedy, who felt they had embarrassed his administration during the buildup to a summit with Premier of the Soviet Union Nikita Khrushchev. There was also worries that they would impact America's ability to persuade neutral Third World countries in Africa to align with the West. Kennedy was reportedly more angry at Farmer for organizing the Freedom Ride than he was at Connor for organizing the attack or at Governor Patterson for being unable to prevent it. He described the Freedom Rides as "a pain in the ass". Attorney General Robert Kennedy blamed "extremists on both side", provoking outrage within the civil rights movement.

Although many in Anniston sympathized with the attacks, some members of the business community formed a biracial Human Relations Council to help restore the city's tarnished image.

==== International ====
The attacks alienated America's Cold War allies and damaged the country's reputation as leader of the "Free World". They were reported on negatively in newspapers across the world, although many still praised Kennedy for his handling of the situation. The attacks were used by Eastern Bloc countries for propaganda purposes. Chinese reporters and Radio Havana Cuba both falsely suggested President Kennedy had been complicit in their organization.

In Tokyo, Japan, the Birmingham Chamber of Commerce's incoming president, Sidney Smyer, was attending a Rotary International convention. His Japanese hosts and other members of the international business community confronted his delegation with a Japanese newspaper which had published Langston's photograph. The negative impact on Birmingham's appeal to investors was obvious, and although he was a committed segregationist himself, Smyer told colleagues that something had to be done about Connor.

=== End of the original Freedom Ride ===
==== Riders regroup ====
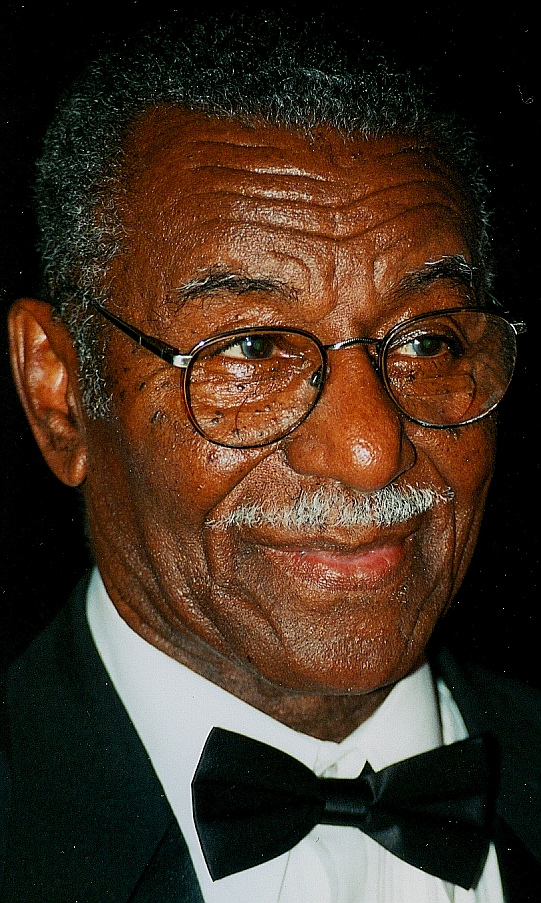
Birmingham activist Fred Shuttlesworth, who sheltered the Freedom Riders following the attacks. Photograph taken in 2002.

After receiving medical treatment, the Freedom Riders and the accompanying journalists were eventually reunited at Shuttlesworth's house, which doubled as a headquarters for the Alabama Christian Movement for Human Rights. Motivated by Peck's determination despite his injuries, the Riders decided to continue the journey. Booker placed a call to John Seigenthaler, who worked as a special assistant for Robert Kennedy, and informed him of the day's events. Booker was eventually put in touch with Kennedy and explained to him that the Riders needed police protection for the next leg of the journey from Birmingham to Montgomery, Alabama's capital.

==== Flight to New Orleans ====
On May 15, the Riders traveled to the Greyhound bus terminal in Birmingham while Kennedy attempted to negotiate their security with Governor Patterson. At the terminal, BPD officers kept the Riders separated from a large mob of angry whites that had turned up to harass them. The environment was extremely hostile and, despite Kennedy's threats of federal intervention, Patterson insisted that he would be unable to "guarantee protection for this bunch of rabble-rousers". Due to the threat of more violence and the fact that they could not find a bus driver willing to drive them, the Riders were eventually convinced by Kennedy to take a plane to New Orleans, where they would attend the planned civil rights rally.

The Riders were taken to Birmingham Airport, where, after a number of false bomb scares, they flew to New Orleans. Accommodation was provided to them by Norman Francis at Xavier University of Louisiana. The Riders stayed until the May 17 rally, after which they left New Orleans to return home.

=== New Freedom Rides ===
==== Replacements organised in Nashville ====
Meanwhile, in Nashville, Tennessee, SNCC cofounder Diane Nash firmly believed that if the Freedom Ride was halted, it would send a message that violence could stop the civil rights movement. She convinced Farmer to let her arrange for a new group of Freedom Riders (including Lewis, who had returned from his interview) to continue where the original Riders had left off.

==== Violence in Montgomery ====
The replacement Riders also faced violence in Alabama. Connor initially attempted to arrest and deport them, but their bus finally received an escort from Birmingham to Montgomery. Police abandoned the bus as it reached the city limits and when the Riders disembarked at the terminal, they were beaten by a large mob of whites in circumstances that were almost identical to the attack in Birmingham. Seigenthaler (sent by Robert Kennedy to assist the Riders) was knocked unconscious when a pipe fractured his skull, and more photographs of bloodied victims were printed in the national press. This further increased public sympathy toward the Freedom Riders, piling more pressure on the Kennedy brothers to resolve the issue.

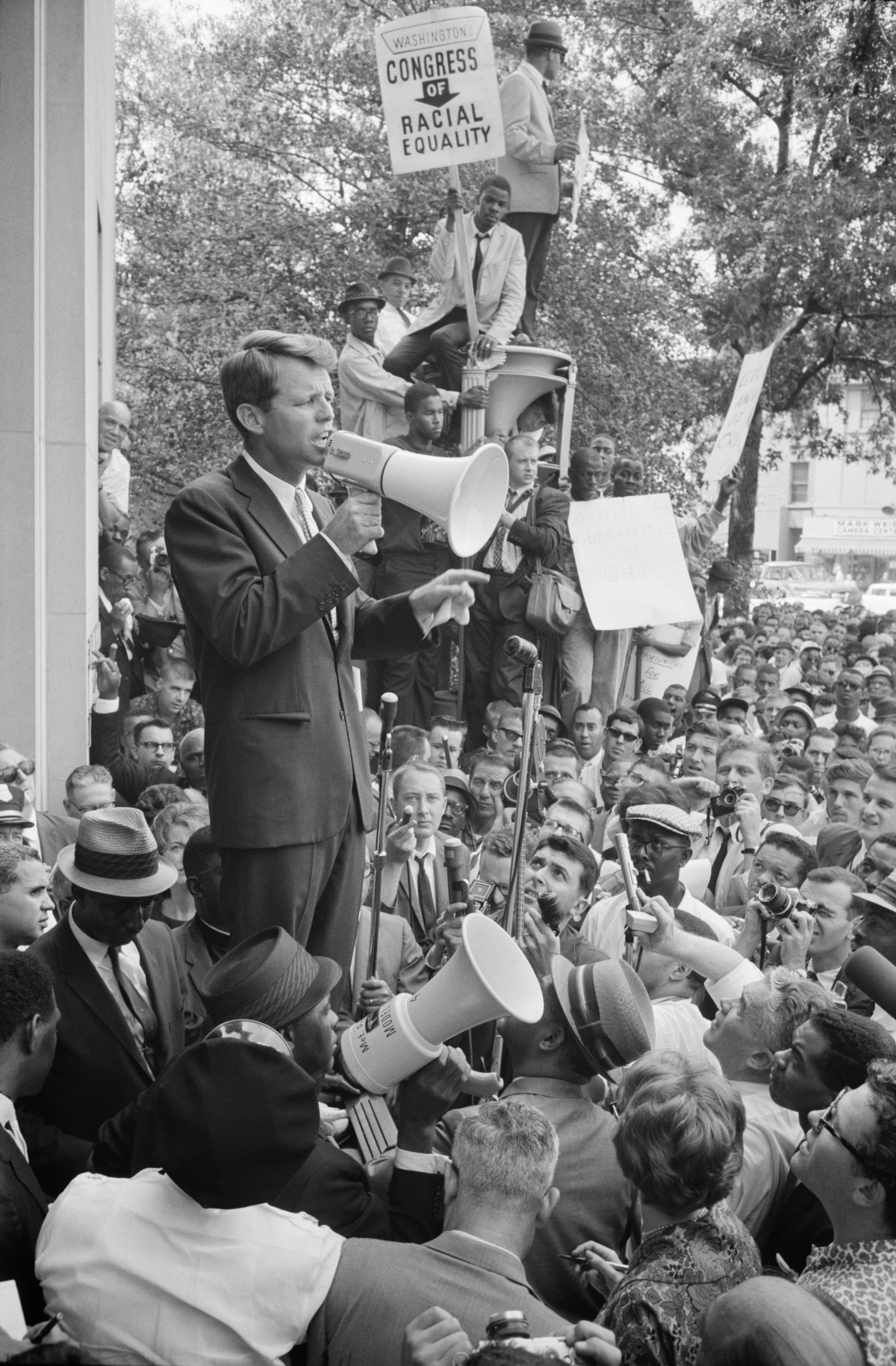
The attacks forced United States Attorney General Robert F. Kennedy to act on the issue of segregation. Here, he speaks to a crowd outside the Justice Department. A raised CORE placard can be seen in the background. Photograph taken in 1963.

The battered Riders would end up in a local black church with Ralph Abernathy, King, and other local activists, where they were besieged by a thousands strong mob. As bricks and rocks were thrown through the window, King rang Robert Kennedy and pleaded with him to help them. Faced with the threat that the United States Army would be deployed from nearby Fort Benning if he did not act, Governor Patterson finally sent state troopers to quell the violence.

==== Freedom Ride Coordinating Committee ====
The new Riders eventually made it to Jackson, Mississippi, where they were promptly jailed. Robert Kennedy had secretly arranged to not interfere with Mississippi authorities as long as they could prevent violence against the Riders. To counteract this, Farmer and King arranged a meeting where CORE, SCLC, SNCC agreed to form an alliance as the Freedom Ride Coordinating Committee (FRCC).

Recruited and funded by the FRCC, hundreds of activists would travel from across the country into the Deep South as part of over sixty different Freedom Rides. Most of the Riders would be jailed in Jackson; the plan was to strain the Mississippi prison system to its limit while simultaneously building on the publicity the original Ride had generated.

Kennedy urged for a "cooling off" period but this idea was rejected by CORE and other groups. McDonald would later write:

In spite of this, we find responsible people demanding "cooling off" periods and moderation. This is not a new request, and we often have complied with it. I would be happy if they would moderately respect me as a human being and afford me the same dignities that are the right of everyone of us to expect and receive — which include the right to life, liberty, and the pursuit of happiness. But according to these so-called moderates, I already am going too fast. They would rather I did nothing to secure the civil rights that have been denied me and my people since the first Negro slave was brought here in the seventeenth century. For 300 years we have been cooling off.

=== ICC ends segregation in transportation ===
In November 1955, the Interstate Commerce Commission (ICC) ruled in Keys v. Carolina Coach Co. that segregation on interstate buses was forbidden, breaking its previous adherence to the doctrine of separate but equal facilities established by Plessy v. Ferguson (1896). However the ICC's chairman and lone author of the dissenting opinion in the Keys ruling, South Carolina Democrat J. Monroe Johnson, simply refrained from implementing it.

On May 29, as Freedom Riders continued to be jailed, Robert Kennedy sent a legal petition to the ICC, demanding they implement their own ruling. On November 1, new regulations were issued by the ICC: segregation was forbidden, "white" and "colored" signs were removed, and terminal facilities were consolidated. Although the change was gradual and not immediate (on the same day, nine black students were refused service at a terminal in Albany, Georgia), this effectively marked the end of segregation in interstate transportation.

== Legacy and commemorations ==
=== Legacy ===
The Freedom Rides of 1961 and the May 14 attacks are considered a vital event in the civil rights movement. They are a prominent example of the successful use of nonviolence to effect political change. They helped inspire further activism in the form of Freedom Schools, involvement with the Black Power movement, and voter registration campaigns.

==== Other "Freedom Rides" ====
The Freedom Rides inspired other groups to carry out similar initiatives.

In June 1961, members of the National Democratic Party in Southern Rhodesia launched a Freedom Ride to protest against the country's racial segregation.

In 1962, white segregationists organized what became known as the Reverse Freedom Rides, in which southern blacks were lured to northern cities with the promise of good work and conditions. The aim was to overburden the cities, provoking discrimination against the new arrivals. It was not successful.

In 1965, in Australia, a Freedom Ride was organized to highlight racial discrimination against Aboriginal Australians.

In 2011, as part of the Israeli–Palestinian conflict, Palestinian activists attempting to flout Israeli restrictions took a bus from the West Bank to Jerusalem. They were arrested at the edge of the city.

=== Commemorations ===
In January 2017 President Barack Obama established the Freedom Riders National Monument in Anniston to preserve and commemorate the Freedom Rides. It is administered by the National Park Service.

In Anniston, a Civil Rights Trail was established to educated citizens and visitors about Anniston's role in the civil rights movement. Historic markers were placed at the sites of the former bus terminals.

==== Anniston murals ====
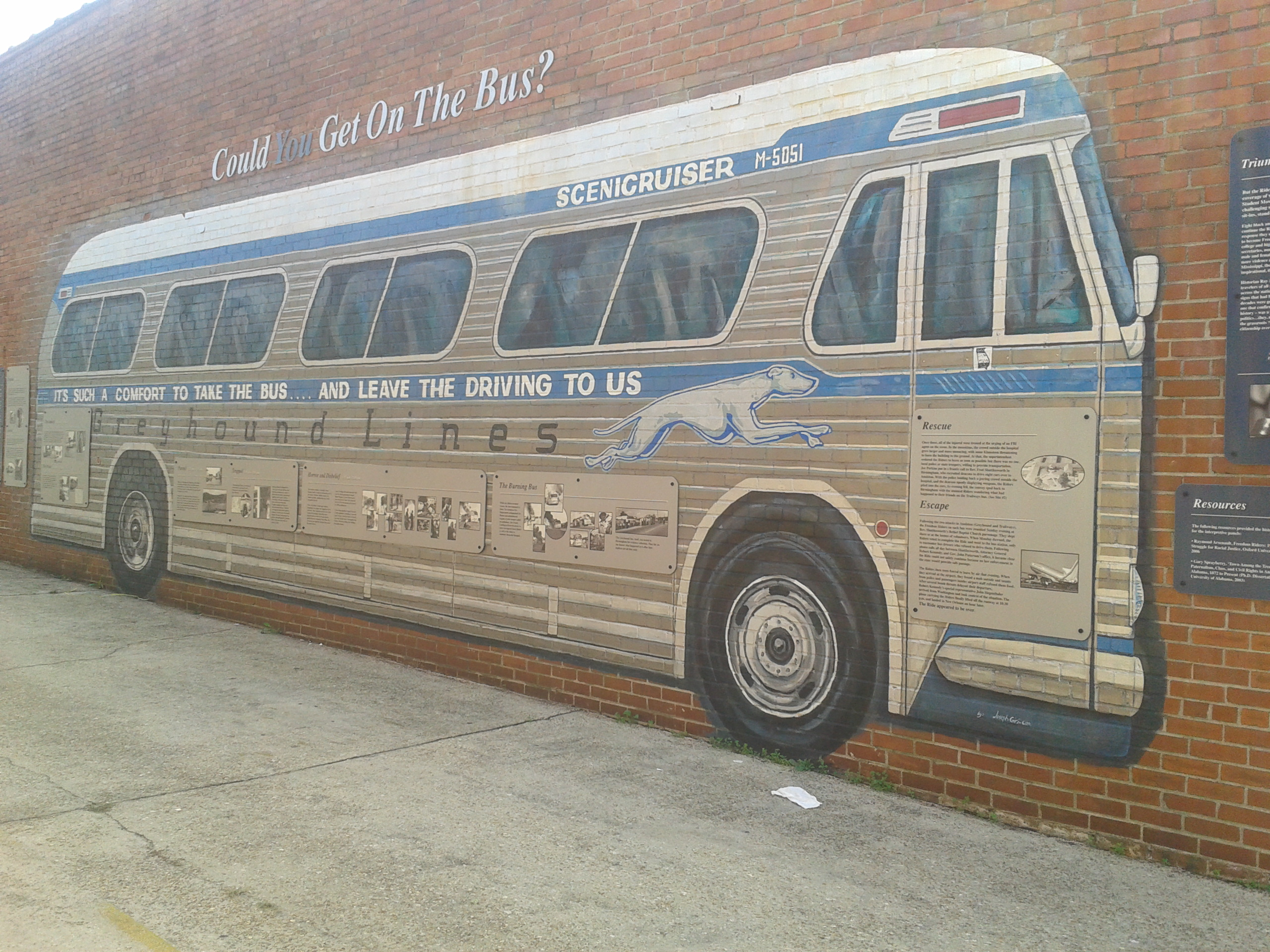
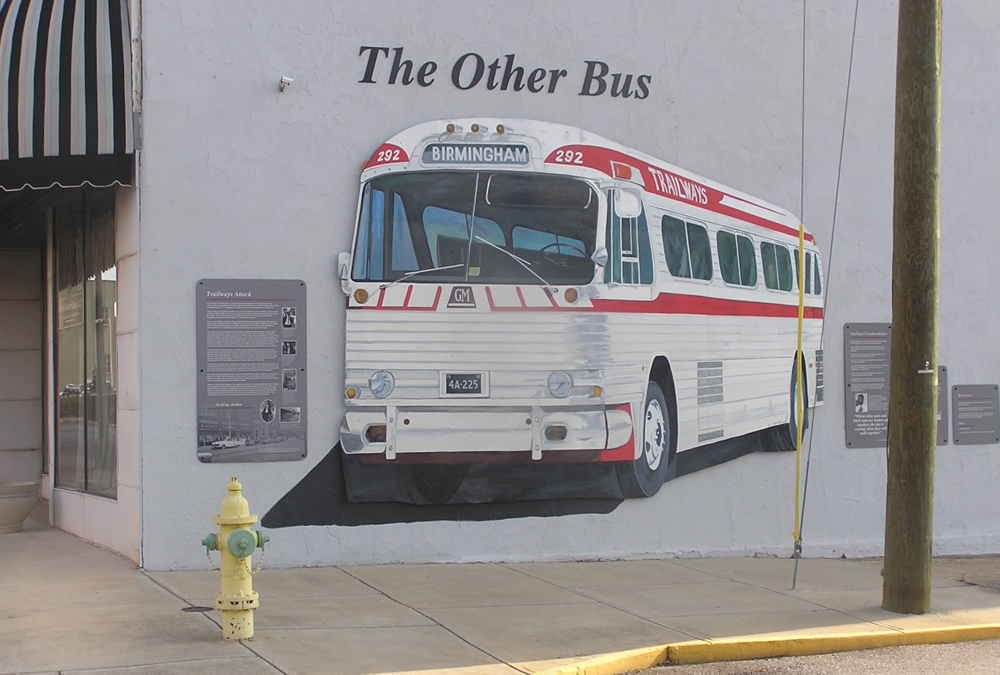
Murals and signs in Anniston commemorating the Greyhound bus (top) and the Trailways bus (bottom).

In downtown Anniston, two murals have been created to depict the Greyhound and Trailways buses as they would have appeared at the time of the Freedom Rides. They are accompanied by signage which informs readers about the attacks.

The Greyhound mural, created by local artist Joseph Giri, is located at 1031 Gurnee Avenue in the alleyway alongside the former Greyhound bus depot where the bus was swarmed by a mob as it arrived in Anniston. The depot now functions as an information center dedicated to the Freedom Rides.

The Trailways mural is located at 900 Noble Street, by the former Trailways station where Klan members forced the Trailways Riders to segregate. An excerpt from the signage states:

When a desegregated bus carrying black and white 'Freedom Riders' arrived at the Trailways Bus Station in Anniston on this date, a group of young white men came aboard to enforce segregated seating: whites in front, blacks in back. The men beat the Riders, forcing them to segregate. After police intervened, the bus continued to Birmingham with the badly injured Freedom Riders kept separated by their attackers.

==== Bus burning site ====
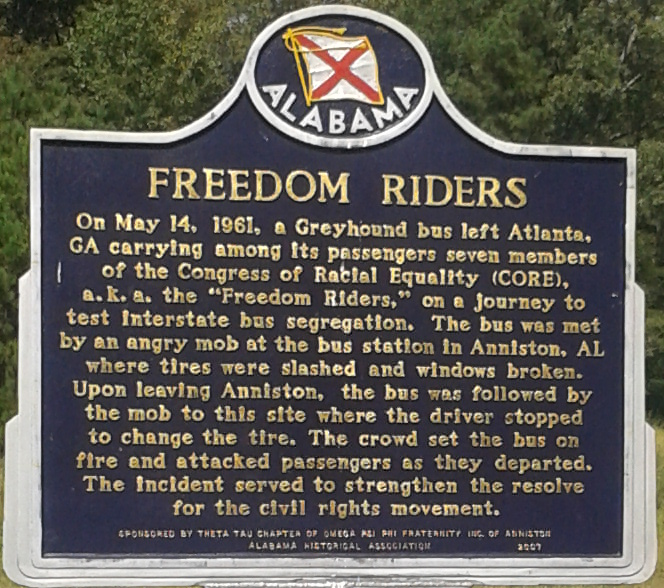
State historic marker at the location of the Greyhound bus burning.

Informative signs are also located at the site where the Greyhound bus was set alight after being stopped by the mob. It is located along Old Birmingham Highway/State Route 202.

In 2007, an Alabama Historical Marker was erected at the site by the Theta Tau chapter of Omega Psi Phi fraternity.
