= 1966 Myers Brothers 250 =

Auto race held at Bowman Gray Stadium in 1966

Race details
- Race 41 of 59 in the 1966 NASCAR Grand National Series season
- Date: August 27, 1966; 60 years ago
- Official name: Myers Brothers 250
- Location: Bowman Gray Stadium, Winston-Salem, North Carolina
- Course: Permanent racing facility
- Course length: 0.250 miles (0.421 km)
- Distance: 250 laps, 62.5 mi (100.5 km)
- Weather: Very hot with temperatures of 84.9 °F (29.4 °C); wind speeds of 7 miles per hour (11 km/h)
- Average speed: 45.928 miles per hour (73.914 km/h)
- Attendance: 15,000

Pole position
Driver	Richard Petty	Petty Enterprises

Most laps led
Driver	David Pearson	Cotton Owens
- Laps: 129

Winner
No. 6	David Pearson	Cotton Owens

Television in the United States
- Network: untelevised
- Announcers: none

The 1966 Myers Brothers 250 was a NASCAR Grand National Series event that was held on August 27, 1966, at Bowman Gray Stadium in Winston-Salem, North Carolina.

== Background ==
Bowman Gray Stadium is a NASCAR sanctioned 1/4-mile (0.40 km) asphalt flat oval short track and longstanding football stadium located in Winston-Salem, North Carolina. It is one of stock car racing's most legendary venues, and is referred to as "NASCAR's longest-running weekly race track". Bowman Gray Stadium is part of the Winston-Salem Sports and Entertainment Complex and is home of the Winston-Salem State University Rams football team. It was also the home of the Wake Forest University football team from 1956 until Groves Stadium (later BB&T Field) opened in 1968.

== Race report ==
The race took one hour and twenty-one minutes to complete. Three cautions slowed the race for sixteen laps. Notable speeds for this race were: 45.928 miles per hour (73.914 km/h) as the average speed and 54.348 miles per hour (87.465 km/h) for the pole position speed. Because the paved oval course only spanned 0.250 miles (0.402 km), speeds on this track emulated that of America's Interstate Highway System.

Fifteen thousand fans came to see David Pearson defeat Richard Petty by ten seconds. There were 23 American-born drivers and one foreign driver (Don Biederman). Dale Inman was one of three most notable crew chiefs in the race along with Frankie Scott and Bud Hartje.

Curtis Turner and Bobby Allison were involved in a crash that got them disqualified from the race in addition to police intervention. However, no charges were laid. The incident started on lap eight of the race and the two drivers would knock and spin each other for approximately ten laps. Both vehicles were eventually tossed out as they came out of a demolition derby. However, Allison and Turner eventually became friends again but this incident would be the most heinous in pre-modern NASCAR history. Turner would eventually die in 1970 from an airplane crash which would also take the life of professional golfer Clarence King.

The transition to purpose-built racecars began in the early 1960s and occurred gradually over that decade. Changes made to the sport by the late 1960s brought an end to the "strictly stock" vehicles of the 1950s.

=== Qualifying ===
Grid	No.	Driver	Manufacturer	Owner
1	42	Richard Petty	'66 Plymouth	Petty Enterprises
2	6	David Pearson	'65 Dodge	Cotton Owens
3	2	Bobby Allison	'65 Chevrolet	Donald Brackins
4	26	Curtis Turner	'66 Ford	Junior Johnson
5	59	Tom Pistone	'64 Ford	Tom Pistone
6	64	Elmo Langley	'64 Ford	Elmo Langley / Henry Woodfield
7	4	John Sears	'64 Ford	L.G. DeWitt
8	48	James Hylton	'65 Dodge	Bud Hartje
9	92	Hank Thomas	'64 Ford	W.S. Jenkins
10	65	Buddy Arrington	'65 Dodge	Buddy Arrington
11	94	Don Biederman	'64 Chevrolet	Ron Stotten
12	40	Eddie Yarboro	'65 Dodge	Eddie Yarboro
13	61	Joel Davis	'66 Chevrolet	Toy Bolton
14	34	Wendell Scott	'65 Ford	Wendell Scott
15	70	J.D. McDuffie	'64 Ford	J.D. McDuffie
16	38	Wayne Smith	'66 Chevrolet	Archie Smith
17	20	Clyde Lynn	'64 Ford	Clyde Lynn
18	60	Ernest Eury	'64 Chevrolet	Joan Petre
19	15	Paul Dean Holt	'64 Ford	Lyle Stelter
20	97	Henley Gray	'66 Ford	Henley Gray
21	00	Buddy Baker	'64 Ford	Clyde Lynn
22	95	Bill Seifert	'64 Ford	Bill Seifert
23	73	Jimmy Helms	'64 Ford	Joan Petre
24	50	Larry Manning	'64 Chevrolet	Edgar Wallen

== Timeline ==
Section reference:

- Start of race: Richard Petty started with the pole position but David Pearson quickly took over the lead.
- Lap 6: Jimmy Helms had a faulty fuel pump, which forced him off the track for the rest of the day.
- Lap 12: Wayne Smith fell out with engine failure.
- Lap 25: Buddy Arrington lost the gas tank from his vehicle.
- Lap 32: Axle problems forced Hank Thomas to accept a meager 21st-place finish out of 24 drivers.
- Lap 50: A problematic ball joint caused Paul Dean Holt to finish in a miserable 20th place.
- Lap 96: Bad vehicle brakes ended Bill Seifert's day on the track.
- Lap 98: Curtis Turner takes over the lead from David Pearson.
- Lap 106: Richard Petty takes over the lead from Curtis Turner.
- Lap 111: Bobby Allison had a terminal crash, he was forced to withdraw from the race.
- Lap 114: Curtis Turner had a terminal crash, making his exit from the race mandatory.
- Lap 153: Rising oil pressure forced Buddy Baker to accept 16th place for the race.
- Lap 169: A faulty axle managed to end Elmo Langley's attempt at a top-ten finish.
- Lap 209: Canadian driver Don Biederman managed to overheat his vehicle, causing him to leave the race.
- Lap 219: David Pearson takes over the lead from Richard Petty.
- Finish: David Pearson was officially declared the winner of the event.

== Finishing order ==
Section reference:

1. David Pearson† (No. 6)
2. Richard Petty (No. 42)
3. James Hylton (No. 48)
4. John Sears† (No. 4)
5. Tom Pistone (No. 59)
6. Wendell Scott† (No. 34)
7. Clyde Lynn† (No. 20)
8. J.D. McDuffie† (No. 70)
9. Henley Gray (No. 97)
10. Eddie Yarboro (No. 40)
11. Don Biederman*† (No. 94)
12. Ernest Eury (No. 60)
13. Larry Manning (No. 50)
14. Joel Davis (No. 61)
15. Elmo Langley*† (No. 64)
16. Buddy Baker*† (No. 00)
17. Curtis Turner*† (No. 26)
18. Bobby Allison* (No. 2)
19. Bill Seifert* (No. 95)
20. Paul Dean Holt* (No. 15)
21. Hank Thomas* (No. 92)
22. Buddy Arrington* (No. 65)
23. Wayne Smith* (No. 38)
24. Jimmy Helms* (No. 73)

* Driver failed to finish race
† Driver is deceased

Preceded by 1966 Maryland 200	NASCAR Grand National Series season 1966	Succeeded by 1966 Southern 500
