= Freedom Riders National Monument =

United States National Monument in Anniston, Alabama

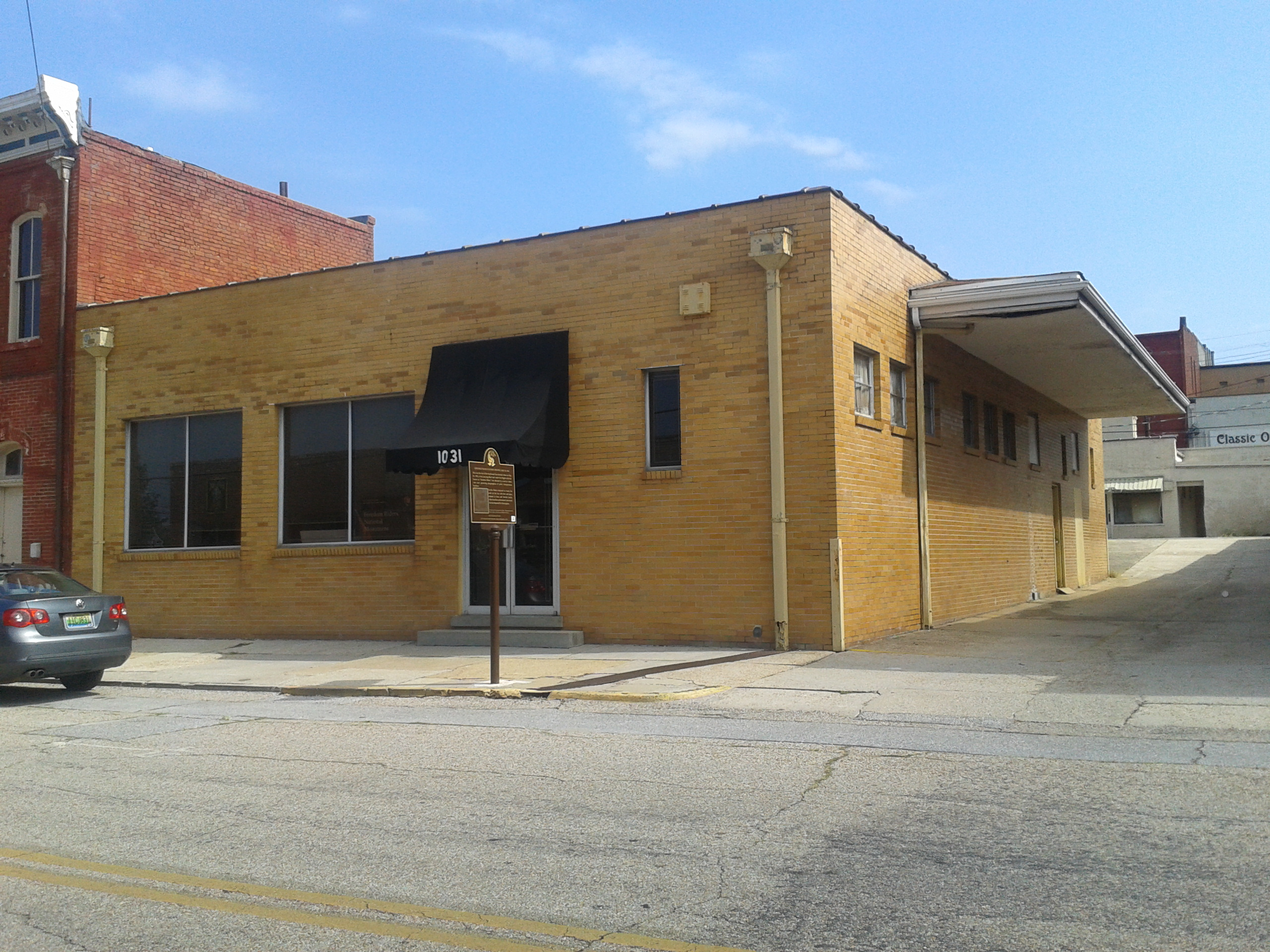
- The former Greyhound station in October 2017

- Location within Alabama Location within the United States
- Interactive map of Freedom Riders National Monument
- 33°38′6″N 85°54′30″W
- Location: Anniston, Alabama

Site notes
- Area: 7.83 acres (3.17 ha)
- Website: Freedom Riders National Monument

U.S. National Monument
- Designated: January 12, 2017

The Freedom Riders National Monument is a United States National Monument in Anniston, Alabama. It was established by President Barack Obama in January 2017 in order to preserve and commemorate Freedom Riders who travelled by bus in mixed black/white groups across the Deep South as part of a protest against racial segregation in Jim Crow states.

The monument marks the location of the Anniston bus attacks, in which two buses of Freedom Riders were violently attacked by white supremacists, all with the approval of the local police. The attacks were widely publicized, and are considered a significant event within the Civil Rights Movement.

The Freedom Riders National Monument is one of three National Monuments that was designated by presidential proclamation of President Obama on January 12, 2017. The second was the Birmingham Civil Rights National Monument and the third, the Reconstruction Era National Historical Park, was re-designated as a National Historical Park on March 12, 2019.

The monument is administered by the National Park Service.

== Sites ==
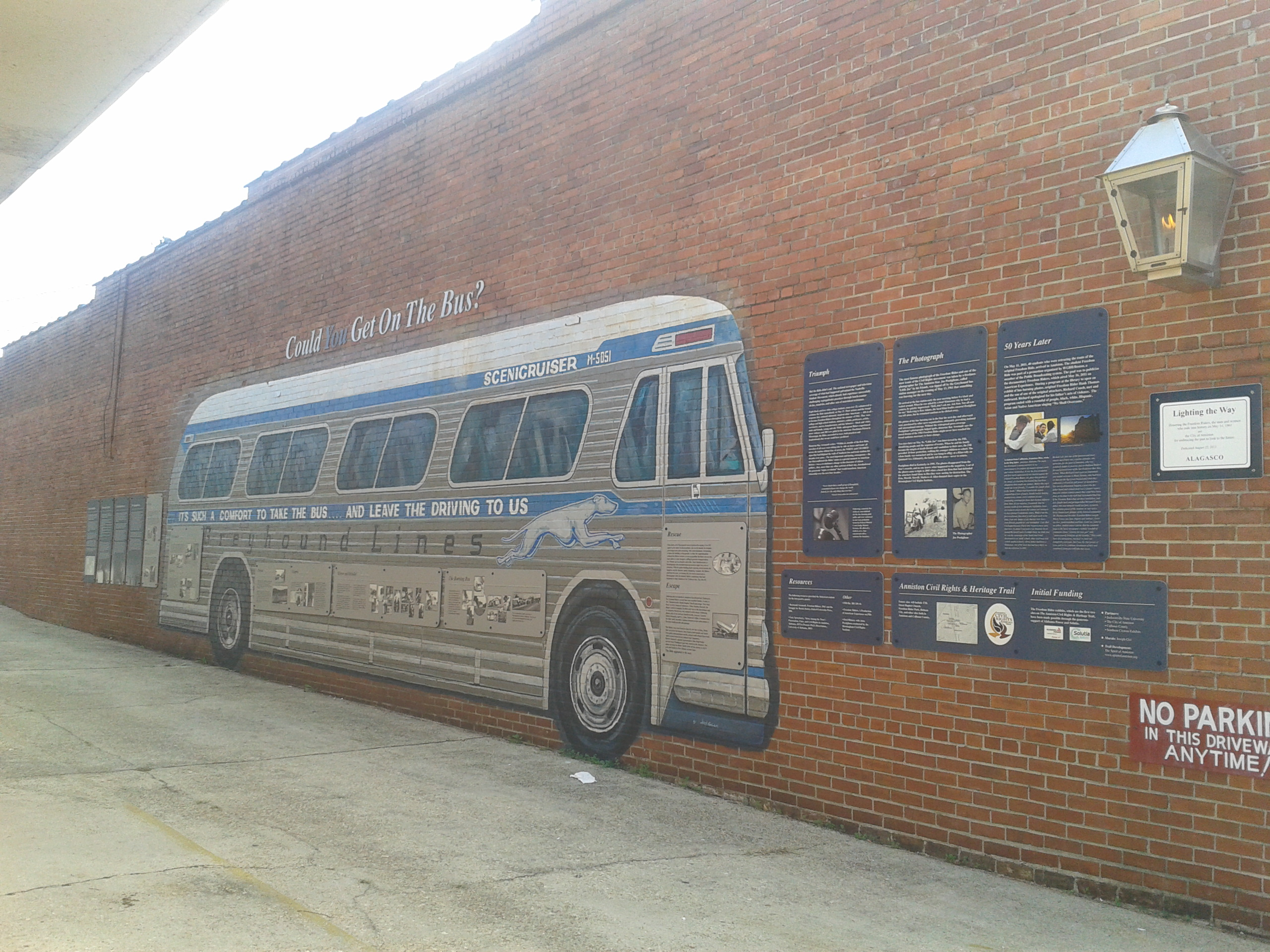
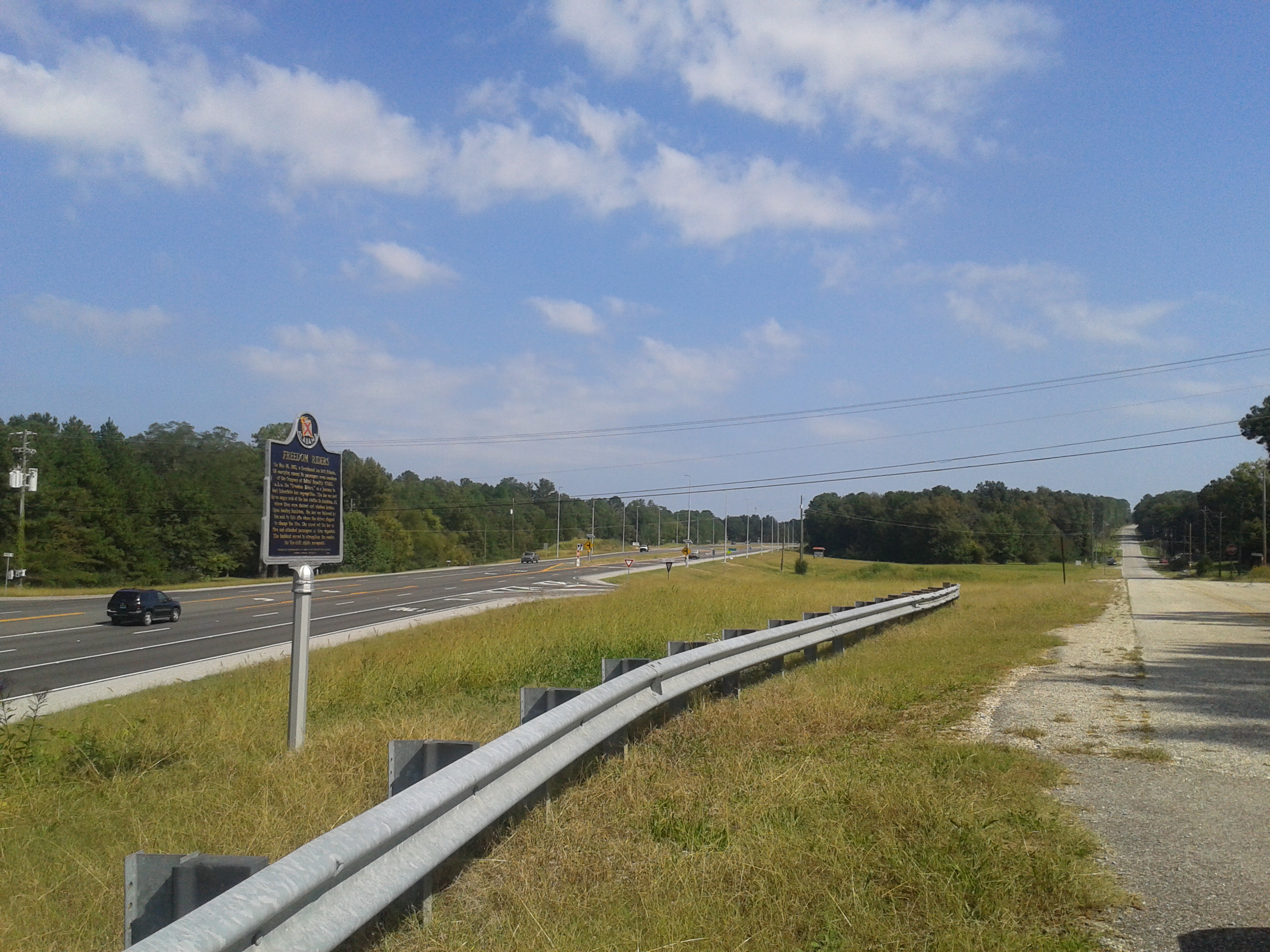
Above: mural and interpretive signage adjacent to the former Greyhound station. Below: view of the bus-burning site in October 2017; the state historical marker is in the foreground, with the field where the burning took place in the middle distance.

The Freedom Riders National Monument comprises two locations, one in downtown Anniston itself and the other outside town.

=== Greyhound Bus Station ===
The first site designated as part of the national monument is the former Greyhound bus depot at 1031 Gurnee Avenue in Anniston, where, on May 14, 1961, a mob attacked an integrated group of white and black Freedom Riders who demanded an end to racial segregation in interstate busing. The mob slashed the bus's tires, threw rocks, broke the bus's windows, and pursued the bus after it pulled away from the depot. Today the wall of the building adjacent to the former depot features a mural and educational panels describing the incident; a similar mural has been installed adjacent to the former Trailways station where the other Freedom Riders arrived later that day and were also subjected to violence. The former Greyhound station was later owned by the City of Anniston prior to its donation to the United States government. It is one of nine sites that are part of the Anniston Civil Rights and Heritage Trail, and is commemorated with a historic marker, erected in 2016. The former Greyhound station is also open to visitors on Wednesdays.

=== Site of bus burning ===
Joe Postiglione's photograph of the burning bus

The second site incorporated into the national monument is that of the bus burning, located outside of Anniston along Old Birmingham Highway/State Route 202 some 6 miles (9.7 km) away from the Greyhound station. It was at this spot that the bus broke down because of its flat tires. The segregationist mob, which had followed it from the bus depot, continued its assault, throwing "a bundle of flaming rags into the bus that exploded seconds later" which set the vehicle ablaze. The mob attacked the passengers as they tried to flee. Freelance photographer Joseph "Little Joe" Postiglione photographed the bus as it burned; the resulting image has become an icon of the civil rights movement. An Alabama Historical Marker, erected in 2007 under the auspices of the Theta Tau chapter of Omega Psi Phi fraternity, marks the site of the bus burning.

It was announced in 2010 that five acres of land surrounding the site of the bus burning had been donated to Calhoun County for the development of a memorial park; initial plans called for a landscaped walkway, with interpretive plaques to be erected at the site. Possible future features include a statue of Hank Thomas, a survivor of the incident, being given water by nearby resident Janie Forsythe. Since designation of the national monument, the National Park Service, Calhoun County, and the Freedom Riders Memorial Committee have begun working together to develop a plan for interpreting the site; Alabama Power provided money for the effort in 2015. A sign denoting the future presence of the park was erected in 2012. Soon after it was placed at the site it was vandalized, but repairs were quickly made.

The site of the burning is today surrounded by private residences.

== History of the monument ==
Designation of the national monument followed a visit by Interior Secretary Sally Jewell and National Park Service Director Jonathan Jarvis to the site in October 2016. The designation of the National Monument was hailed by local leaders in Anniston and Calhoun County, who had actively campaigned for the monument's creation. Others who supported its establishment included Senator Richard Shelby; Representative Mike Rogers, who had introduced a bill to designate Freedom Riders National Historical Park in July 2016; and governor Robert J. Bentley.

A dedication ceremony took place on May 13, 2017, in downtown Anniston, on the day before the 56th anniversary of the incident; some members of the audience had traveled from as far away as Denmark. Former Freedom Rider Hank Thomas, the last living survivor of the bus-burning incident, delivered a speech. An interim visitor center, including a station where visitors may procure a National Parks passport stamp, has been established in the reception area of Anniston City Hall.

In 2017, the National Park Service sought input from the public on planning and interpreting the National Monument. Federal and local officials began drafting formal plans for its management late in 2017. In March 2018, the Anniston City Council commissioned Jacksonville State University to conduct an economic impact study for the monument.

The Freedom Riders National Monument is a feature landmark of the United States Civil Rights Trail.

== See also ==
- Birmingham Civil Rights National Monument
- Medgar and Myrlie Evers Home National Monument
- Civil rights movement in popular culture
- National Register of Historic Places listings in Calhoun County, Alabama
- List of national monuments of the United States
