= Undercover with the KKK =

- Genre: Drama
- Based on: My Undercover Years with the Ku Klux Klan by Gary Thomas Rowe Jr.
- Screenplay by: Lane Slate
- Directed by: Barry Shear
- Starring: Don Meredith; Ed Lauter; Clifton James
- Music by: Morton Stevens
- Country of origin: United States
- Original language: English

Production
- Executive producer: Douglas Benton
- Producers: George Lehr; Debra Miles
- Production locations: Nevada City, California; Roseville, California; Sacramento, California
- Cinematography: Robert C. Moreno
- Editor: Jack Kampschroer
- Running time: 97 minutes
- Production company: Columbia Pictures Television

Original release
- Network: NBC
- Release: October 23, 1979

Undercover with the KKK is a 1979 NBC TV movie based on the autobiography My Undercover Years with the Ku Klux Klan by Gary Thomas Rowe Jr. and starring Don Meredith as Rowe.

== Premise ==
The film tells the true story of Gary Thomas Rowe Jr., who infiltrated the Ku Klux Klan as an undercover FBI informant and then testified as a key witness for the prosecution during the trial of several other Klansmen.

== Cast ==
- Don Meredith as FBI Agent Gary Thomas Rowe Jr.
- Ed Lauter as Raleigh Porter
- Clifton James as Jimmy Eakin
- Albert Salmi as Lester Mitchell
- Michele Carey as Mary Beth Barker
- Lance LeGault as "Weasel"
- Margaret Blye as Billie Ruth Rowe
- Edward Andrews as Pat Murray
- Slim Pickens as Yancey Hicks
- James Wainwright as T.J. Barker
- Don "Red" Barry as Ben Wright
- Ron Trice as Roscoe Cobb
- Carl Lumbly as Reverend Lowell
- Robert Stack as The Narrator
