= Colonel Stone Johnson =

- Born: September 9, 1918; Lowndes County, Alabama
- Died: January 19, 2012 (aged 93)
- Education: Lincoln High School
- Organization(s): Civil Rights Guards; Southern Christian Leadership Conference
- Known for: Protecting black homes and businesses Rescuing Freedom Riders from KKK attack in Anniston; Bodyguard to Martin Luther King Jr. and other activists
- Movement: Civil rights movement
- Opponent: Ku Klux Klan
- Spouse: Beatrice Johnson
- Parent(s): Fannie and Colonel Johnson

Stone Johnson (September 9, 1918 – January 19, 2012) was an African-American activist in the Civil Rights Movement. A railway worker and union representative by trade, he got involved in the civil rights movement in Birmingham, Alabama in the mid 1950s, working with Fred Shuttlesworth. He started a civil rights organization called the Civil Rights Guards that protected homes and business involved in the movement, usually while armed.

Johnson was born in Lowndes County, Alabama to Fannie and Colonel Johnson. His family moved to Birmingham when he was 4. Graduating from Lincoln High School in 1939, he was hired at Louisville & Nashville Railroad Company, where he worked for nearly 40 years. He claimed to be the first black union representative for the company in Birmingham.

Johnson may be best known for having helped to carry a Ku Klux Klan bomb away from Bethel Baptist Church in Birmingham, AL. He also provided armed protection to nonviolent activists in Anniston, Alabama during the 1961 Freedom Rides, rescuing them from a segregationist mob. He also served for a time as vice-president of the Birmingham chapter of the Southern Christian Leadership Conference.

An oft-repeated remark of Johnson, when asked how he'd managed to protect civil rights leaders given his commitment to nonviolence, Johnson replied, "With my nonviolent .38 special."

In 2011, the city of Birmingham dedicated a street in his honor.

He was married to his wife Beatrice for nearly seventy years. She died in May 2011 at the age of 89. Johnson died from illness on Jan 19, 2012 at the age of 93.
