= Gary Thomas Rowe Jr. =

FBI agent infiltrating hate groups in the US

Gary Thomas Rowe
- Born: Gary Thomas Rowe, Jr. August 13, 1933; Savannah, Georgia, United States
- Died: May 25, 1998 (aged 64); Savannah, Georgia, United States
- Other name: Thomas Neil Moore
- Spouse: 4 wives (all divorced)
- Children: 5 (2 adopted)

Gary Thomas Rowe Jr. (August 13, 1933 – May 25, 1998), alias Thomas Neil Moore, was an American paid informant and agent provocateur for the FBI. He infiltrated the Ku Klux Klan as part of the FBI's COINTELPRO project to monitor and disrupt Klan activities. Rowe participated in violent Klan activity against African Americans and civil rights groups and ultimately became a Klansman himself, beating Freedom Riders, shooting a civil rights worker, and teaching Klansmen to build bombs, including the one used in the murder of four children during the bombing of the 16th Street Baptist Church in Alabama. Given immunity, he was never charged for his crimes.

From 1965 until his death, Rowe was a figure of recurring controversy after he testified against fellow Klansmen who were accused of killing Viola Gregg Liuzzo, a civil rights volunteer. He was accused of being an accessory to the murder. Rowe admitted to many of his violent acts in his 1976 autobiography, My Undercover Years with the Ku Klux Klan, and in confession and testimony given to the United States Senate.

== Background ==
Gary Thomas Rowe Jr. was born on August 13, 1933, in Savannah, Georgia, to Gary Thomas Rowe and Alma Ann Sellars. He dropped out of high school to join the Georgia National Guard and United States Marine Corps Reserves. After his discharge, Rowe attempted to join the county sheriff's department but his application was rejected because he did not have a high school diploma. He earned a living as a nightclub bouncer, and he worked briefly with the Bureau of Alcohol Tobacco and Firearms, helping them bust up illegal alcohol stills in return for cheap firearms.

Rowe was married four times, fathered three children and adopted two children.

== Recruitment by the FBI and the Ku Klux Klan ==
Rowe was recruited by FBI Special Agent Barrett G. Kemp in April 1960. The FBI discovered that the Klan was attempting to recruit Rowe, a man known for his work with the ATF and who was seeking a career in law enforcement. The FBI decided that what made him a good candidate for the Klan also made him a good candidate to be an informant against the Klan for the FBI.

In 1975, when in front of the Senate committee, Rowe told them that the FBI knew and disregarded his participation in the violent attacks on African Americans and that he was also tasked with causing friction within the KKK by having sexual relations with some of the Klansmen's wives.

Rowe successfully infiltrated Eastview Klavern 13, the most violent chapter of the Ku Klux Klan in American history, in May 1960. He began receiving payments from the FBI for "services rendered," and FBI Director J. Edgar Hoover personally approved these payments.

The payments that Rowe received from the FBI ranged from $80 to $250 with the addition of expenses.

== Involvement in the Ku Klux Klan ==
=== Mob attack on the Freedom Riders ===
In 1961, Gary Thomas Rowe helped plan and lead a violent mob attack against the Freedom Riders in Anniston, Alabama. He worked together with the Birmingham Police Commissioner, Bull Connor, and Police Sergeant Tom Cook (an avid Ku Klux Klan supporter) to organize violence against the Freedom Riders with local Ku Klux Klan chapters. They assured Rowe that the mob would have 15 minutes to attack the bus before any arrests were made.

Rowe admitted to using a baseball bat during the attack, in which the mob attacked the Greyhound bus carrying the Freedom Riders at a bus station in Anniston, Alabama on May 14, Mothers Day. They slashed the tires and set the bus on fire with the Freedom Riders still inside. The mob held the doors shut, intending to let the peaceful civil rights group burn alive, but a small explosion scared them back from the door. As the Freedom Riders exited the bus, they were badly beaten by the mob and many had to be taken to hospitals which refused to treat them.

Although there were state patrolmen there during the incident and they fired warning shots to call off the mob, they did very little to protect the Freedom Riders from being beaten and burnt alive. Most of the Freedom Riders who were intercepted in Anniston sustained life-threatening injuries either from the beatings by the Ku Klux Klan, or from prolonged exposure to the smoke and fumes from the destroyed bus, and were sent to Anniston Memorial Hospital for immediate attention. When an ambulance arrived, its driver would only take white Freedom Riders to the hospital. The driver was shamed into taking both black and white casualties by the white Riders' refusal to go without their black companions, coupled with the intervention of an undercover policeman, Ell Cowling. When the injured Freedom Riders arrived at the hospital there was no doctor present, only nurses to provide aid to those in need. They were eventually denied medical attention because they had "caused a commotion" by bringing the white mob to the hospital. Even though Gary Thomas Rowe had informed the FBI three weeks earlier that the attack on Freedom Riders would happen, they decided not to intervene but only to ask what had happened to Genevieve Hughes, who was one of the injured Freedom Riders. She stated, "When I woke up the nurse asked me if I could talk with the FBI. The FBI man did not care about us, but only the bombing".

The Freedom Riders were attacked by the KKK again in Birmingham. Once again, Gary Thomas Rowe played a central role in the mobbing and with the help of Commissioner Bull Connor. The KKK used iron pipes, baseball bats and bicycle chains to beat the Freedom Riders as they left the bus.

Years later, Rowe recalled how a call from police headquarters to Rowe had tipped them off to when and where to attack the Freedom Riders in Birmingham, saying:

We made an astounding sight ... men running and walking down the streets of Birmingham on Sunday afternoon carrying chains, sticks, and clubs. Everything was deserted; no police officers were to be seen except one on a street corner. He stepped off and let us go by, and we barged into the bus station and took it over like an army of occupation. There were Klansmen in the waiting room, in the rest rooms, in the parking area.

A photograph of Rowe and several others, including Eastview Klavern leader Hubert Page, beating George Webb on May 14, 1961, was taken by Tommy Langston of the Birmingham Post-Herald, who was also caught and beaten. Although the camera was smashed, the film survived and the photo became one of only a few pieces of physical evidence of Rowe's involvement.

In 1975 Rowe testified before the United States Senate Select Committee on Intelligence, chaired by Idaho Senator Frank Church. He wore a cotton hood over his head to conceal his features. He told the committee that he and his fellow Klansmen "were promised 15 minutes with absolutely no intervention from any police officer whatsoever" during the May 1961 Freedom Riders' arrival. Rowe claims that he informed the FBI of this conversation, but no intervention was made by the authorities.

=== 16th Street Baptist Church Bombing ===
In 1963, Gary Thomas Rowe may have helped perpetrate the 16th Street Baptist Church bombing that killed four young girls. One of the Klansmen eventually convicted of the crime, Robert Edward Chambliss, said that it was Rowe who had bombed the church. Investigative records show that Rowe, who was no stranger to dynamite, had twice failed polygraph tests when questioned as to his possible involvement in the bombing. Because of this, the FBI and the Alabama Attorney General serving as prosecutor Bill Baxley did not use Rowe as a witness in Chambliss's trial.

The FBI was also said to believe that Rowe was involved in the bombing of Martin Luther King Jr.'s motel room at the Gaston Motel on May 11, 1963, as well as the bombing of the house and parsonage of Martin Luther King Jr.'s brother. Through one of his African American informants, Rowe claimed that black Muslims were responsible for placing the bombs there. Rowe was eventually arrested with several other Klansmen in June 1963 after Alabama police received a tip-off that they were in possession of a truck full of assorted firearms and explosives intended for use at the University of Alabama to prevent the admission of James Hood and Vivian Malone. They were later released from jail and given back their weapons.

=== The murder of Viola Liuzzo ===
In 1965, Rowe was involved in the murder of civil rights activist Viola Liuzzo as she was returning from the Selma to Montgomery marches with other activists. Rowe was in the car with three other Klansmen as they chased Viola's car after they saw a black man in the passenger seat. They pulled up next to her car and shot her dead.

The FBI attempted to downplay the situation and discredit Liuzzo by spreading rumors that she was a member of the Communist Party, that she was a heroin addict and had abandoned her children to have sexual relationships with African Americans involved in the Civil Rights Movement. This came at a time when the Bureau was also trying to smear Dr. Martin Luther King Jr.'s Southern Christian Leadership Conference and the Communist Party.

In 1965, Rowe testified as a trial witness against the three other Klansmen involved in Liuzzo's murder: Collie Leroy Wilkins Jr., William Orville Eaton, and Eugene Thomas. Because he had provided information leading to their conviction, Federal authorities placed Rowe in the Witness Protection Program under the name of Thomas Neil Moore. Following his testimony, Rowe was rewarded with a job as a deputy U.S. Marshal.

Rowe was relocated to his home town of Savannah, Georgia. Later that year, Alabama authorities attempted to have him extradited back to Alabama to charge him with the murder of Liuzzo. However, they were unsuccessful. Rowe claimed that the FBI had promised him complete immunity in return for the information he provided against the other Klansmen.

== Later years and death ==
After Rowe testified against fellow Klansmen in the Liuzzo case in 1965, Rowe was relocated to Savannah, Georgia, his home town, where he worked for the U.S. Marshals and for a private security company. For the rest of his life, Rowe would be a highly controversial figure. However, he was never convicted of any wrongdoing.

Rowe surfaced in 1975 before a congressional committee. Wearing a bizarre cotton hood that resembled the Klan headpiece to conceal his new identity, Rowe told the Senate committee that the FBI had known and approved of his violence against blacks. He testified that the FBI did nothing to stop the violence, even when he gave them advance warning.

In 1978, Rowe confessed to killing an unknown black man in a riot with a firearm, a previously undisclosed crime. By making this confession, one of the investigation memos suggests that Rowe may have been bargaining for blanket immunity for whatever occurred while he was an informant.

In 1979 his autobiography was adapted into the NBC TV movie Undercover with the KKK starring Don Meredith as Rowe.

At the age of 64, Gary Thomas Rowe Jr. died of a heart attack on May 25, 1998, in Savannah, Georgia. He was buried under the name Thomas Neil Moore, the name given to him by the Witness Protection Program. According to Eugene Brooks, who had been Rowe's lawyer, Rowe had become bankrupt and had long been divorced from his fourth wife.
