= Simeon Booker =

American journalist

- Booker in an undated photo
- Born: Simeon Saunders Booker Jr. August 27, 1918; Baltimore, Maryland, U.S.
- Died: December 10, 2017 (aged 99); Solomons, Maryland, U.S.
- Education: Virginia Union University
- Occupation: Journalist
- Spouse: Carol Booker (until his death)

Simeon Saunders Booker Jr. (August 27, 1918 – December 10, 2017) was an African-American journalist whose work appeared in leading news publications for more than 50 years. He was known for his journalistic works during the civil rights movement and for his coverage of the 1955 murder of 14-year-old Emmett Till. He worked for The Washington Post, Jet, and Ebony.

== Biography ==
=== Early years ===
Born in Baltimore, Maryland, to Simeon Saunders Booker and Roberta Waring Booker, Booker moved with his family to Youngstown, Ohio, when he was five years old. There, his father opened a YMCA for African-Americans.

While attending Covington Street Elementary School in Youngstown, he wrote a poem that was published in the local newspaper, the Youngstown Vindicator.

While a high school student at The Rayen School (affectionately known as Rayen) in Youngstown, some of Booker's stories were published in the Baltimore Afro American, a prominent African American newspaper.

=== Education ===
Booker graduated from high school in Youngstown and then enrolled at Youngstown College, but transferred to Virginia Union University in Richmond, Virginia, when he learned that Black students were denied activity cards at the YMCA-sponsored school. He earned money during college by providing publicity for Virginia Union's sports teams. He graduated from Virginia Union with a degree in English in 1942.

=== Early career ===
Booker returned to Youngstown during summer vacations and published articles about the Negro league baseball games there. Upon graduating with a degree in English, he took his first job with the Afro-American. Booker later returned to Ohio and worked for the Cleveland Call and Post, where a series he wrote concerning slum housing earned him a Newspaper Guild Award. Booker was offered a prestigious Nieman Fellowship at Harvard University in 1950–51.

=== Journalistic career ===
In 1952, Booker became the first black reporter for The Washington Post. Booker was best known for his reporting during the civil rights movement while working for Jet and Ebony magazines. His coverage of the 1955 murder of 14-year-old Emmett Till in Mississippi and the subsequent trial is one of the most noted pieces of journalism from the era. During the 1960 presidential election cycle, in an attempt to garner the support of Black voters, the campaign of John F. Kennedy attempted to buy Booker's column in Jet magazine, meaning the campaign would write the column and the magazine would publish it under Booker's byline; Booker and the publisher refused.

Booker retired in 2007 at the age of 88, after serving as Jet's Washington Bureau chief for 51 years.

Booker served as the Washington, D.C. bureau chief of the Johnson Publishing Company, interviewing presidents, members of Congress, as well as notable civil rights leaders, Martin Luther King Jr., Roy Wilkins, Whitney Young, A. Philip Randolph and James Farmer.

During his long career, Booker was recognized by his peers with numerous awards, including a Wilkie Award. In 1982, he became the first African-American journalist to win the National Press Club's Fourth Estate Award for lifetime contributions to journalism.

On January 17, 2013, Booker was inducted into the National Association of Black Journalists' Hall of Fame. In 2015, he was awarded the George Polk Career Award.

In February 2017, 17 members of the U.S. House of Representatives introduced a bipartisan bill nominating Booker for a Congressional Gold Medal.

=== Death ===
Booker died on December 10, 2017, in Solomons, Maryland, from pneumonia-related complications, at the age of 99. He is survived by his wife Carol McCabe and three children: Simeon III, Theresa, and Theodore. A memorial service for Booker was held on January 29, 2018, in Washington National Cathedral.

== Published books ==
- Shocking the Conscience: A Reporter's Account of the Civil Rights Movement (University Press of Mississippi, April 2013)
- Susie King Taylor, Civil War Nurse (McGraw-Hill, June 1969)
- Black Man's America (Prentice-Hall, 1964)
