= Moses Newson =

American journalist

Moses J. Newson
- Born: February 5, 1927 (age 99); Fruitland Park, Florida
- Education: Lincoln University
- Occupation: Journalist
- Years active: 1952–1998
- Employer(s): Tri-State Defender & Baltimore Afro-American newspapers
- Awards: 2014 NABJ Hall of Fame Honoree, 2008 Hall of Fame Maryland-Delaware-District of Columbia Press Association

Moses J. Newson (born February 5, 1927) is an American journalist for the Baltimore Afro-American in Baltimore, Maryland who reported on the Civil Rights Movement, most notably the Freedom Rides.

== Personal ==
Moses Newson was born in 1927 in Fruitland Park, Florida. After attending high school in Florida, he enlisted in the United States Navy from 1945 to 1947, which made him eligible for the G.I. Bill to attend college. After his time in the Navy, he attended college at Lincoln University (Missouri), where he earned a bachelor's degree in journalism.

== Career ==
Newson started his first job as a reporter in 1952 for the Tri-State Defender in Memphis, Tennessee where he and fellow Lincoln University graduate and editor L. Alex Wilson were the only two full-time staff members. In 1957, Newson left the Tri-State Defender, and joined the Baltimore Afro-American where he eventually became the executive editor for the final 10 years of his 21-year career at the newspaper. While at the Baltimore Afro-American, he covered such historic events as the Freedom Riders. In 1970, Newson reported from national political conventions as well as a number of foreign countries during critical periods, including his coverage of post-civil war Nigeria, covering the Bahamian independence, and coverage of Apartheid in South Africa. Leaving the newspaper business after 26 years, Newson worked for the U.S. Department of Health, Education and Welfare (later to become the Department of Health and Human Services) as a Public Affairs specialist. After working for the government for 17 years, Newson retired at the age of 68. In 1998, a few years after his retirement, Newson teamed up with personal friend and Hall of Fame Sportswriter Sam Lacy to help him write his autobiography Fighting for Fairness, in which Lacy recounts his career of bringing dramatic change to the sports world by helping break racial barriers. His columns are filled with on-the-scene accounts and insider stories of not only traveling/living with the teams, but fighting with and for them as well.

== Notable works of journalism ==
Newson was born in Florida, started his career in Memphis, Tennessee, and moved for work to the Baltimore/Washington D.C. area.

As a reporter, Newson covered the Civil Rights Movement, school desegregation, voting rights, and other events related to domestic human rights stories. He soon became a city editor with the Tri-State Defender. In what was an extremely violent year during the Civil Rights Movement, Newson covered the infamous murder and trial of Emmett Till, the 14-year-old African-American boy who was mutilated in Mississippi for allegedly flirting with a white woman. For the first time, Newson and other African-American reporters sat side by side with white reporters covering the story. Newson found himself covering the 1954 Supreme Court of the United States decision of Brown v. Board of Education, as well as school desegregation in Hoxie, Arkansas and Clinton, Tennessee.

His first assignment at the Baltimore Afro-American took him to Little Rock, Arkansas to cover the Civil Rights crisis that was taking place there, which had been a national news story for months. Arkansas Governor Orval Faubus ordered the Arkansas National Guard to block black students from entering Central High School. As a result, President Dwight D. Eisenhower sent 1,000 troops from the 101st Airborne Division to intervene and protect the students who were integrating the school. Newson was among a group of black reporters who were blocked from reporting and brutally attacked and beaten by the white mob. In 1961, Newson became one of only two journalists who initially rode on the Congress of Racial Equality (CORE) Freedom Riders, joining the group of Civil Rights demonstrators from Baltimore to New Orleans to defy Jim Crow laws. Newson's bus was attacked in Anniston, Alabama when a mob firebombed it and forced the doors shut in an attempt to trap the passengers inside; Newson was the last person to leave the burning bus. Gene Roberts, co-author of Race Beat, was quoted as saying "Being a black reporter during these times was extremely dangerous, and there arguably wouldn't have been a Civil Rights Movement without the black press." In 1968, less than one month before the assassination of Martin Luther King Jr., Newson traveled to Atlanta for a one-on-one interview with Dr. King while he planned the Poor People's March in Washington, D.C.

== Context ==
During some of the most turbulent times in American history, especially during the Civil Rights Movement, and while facing an alarming amount of hate and bigotry, Newson risked his life to provide accurate insight from the frontlines of the fight for equality.

== Impact ==
Moses Newson witnessed and reported on some of the most important times in United States history, especially when it came to the Civil Rights Movement and the fight for equality for African Americans. He along with so many other African American journalists risked their lives to make sure the public knew the true nature of what was going on throughout the United States.

== Writings ==
- WorldCat.org Identities

== Awards ==
- NABJ Hall of Fame (2014)
- 2008 Hall of Fame Maryland-Delaware-District of Columbia Press Association (2008)
- Named 1 of 50 jurors appointed for the Pulitzer Prize awards in journalism

== See also ==
- National Association of Black Journalists Hall of Fame
- Sam Lacy
