= Hank Thomas =

American civil rights activist and entrepreneur (born 1941)

- Born: Henry James Thomas; August 29, 1941 (age 84); Jacksonville, Florida, U.S.
- Occupations: Civil rights activist, entrepreneur
- Children: 2

Henry "Hank" James Thomas (born August 29, 1941) is an African American civil rights activist and entrepreneur. Thomas was one of the original 13 Freedom Riders who traveled on Greyhound and Trailways buses through the South in 1961 to protest racial segregation, holding demonstrations at bus stops along the way.

Thomas' role in the Civil Rights Movement continued as he became one of the founders of the Student Nonviolent Coordinating Committee (SNCC) and participated in multiple Freedom Rides. In 1965, he served in the Vietnam War as a medic. He was injured in battle and subsequently received a Purple Heart.

He is featured in the National Park Service's International Civil Rights Walk of Fame at the Martin Luther King Jr. National Historic Site.

== Early life and education ==
Thomas was born August 29, 1941, in Jacksonville, Florida. He learned to read at the age of four from his mother, Tina R. Heggs, who had only a sixth grade education. Never knowing his biological father, Thomas was raised by an abusive stepfather. Thomas spent most of his childhood in St. Augustine, Florida. He started protesting racial injustices early in life. In the book Breach of Peace, Thomas explains that "rebellion came natural" to him. At age 9 or 10, he corrected a white insurance man who addressed his aunt using her first name only. Later on, when blacks were not allowed to check out books in the library, Thomas would take his own books there to read. As he grew up, he participated in sit-ins, and sat in white seats on local buses.

Thomas attended Howard University in Washington D.C. While attending Howard, Thomas participated in many lunch counter sit-ins, and became one of the founders of the Student Nonviolent Coordination Committee (SNCC). His commitment to civil rights increased as he heard about the sit-in movements going on in Greensboro. Inspired by these movements, Thomas became a participant and organizer of early movements in Maryland and in Virginia.

Thomas' first arrest was at a movie theater in Hyattsville, MD. He attempted to purchase movie tickets at a white movie theater, and they wouldn't let him buy any because he was black, so he waited. Eventually the police arrived came and arrested him.

"My first arrest came in the Hyattsville, MD. There's a movie theater there that, of course, we could not go in. And we went there to buy tickets, prearranging we wouldn't move out of the way for other people to buy tickets. That's when I was arrested. That was the beginning."

== Freedom Rides ==
On May 4, 1961, Hank Thomas joined the first Freedom Rider group. Originally, he was not going to participate, but his roommate, John Moody, who was supposed to join the event, got sick and was unable to attend, so Thomas took his place.

Here is Thomas' quote on being selected as a Freedom Rider:

"My roommate John Moody had been accepted as a Freedom Rider, and at the last minute, he couldn't go. I don't know whether it was for illness on his part or some illness in his family. It was too late for them to start interviewing around for someone else, and he suggested, "Well, why don't you take my roommate?" They looked at my age, and they wanted somebody 21 or over. When I went to see them, I'm a big tall fella so I looked big for my age. [Laughs.] But I still say that they just didn't have time to talk to anyone else so that's how I got selected. [Laughs.]"

The rides went as expected until May 14, Mothers' Day, of 1961. The Greyhound bus Thomas was riding was making its way into Anniston, Alabama. At the time, Anniston had a large African-American population, a fairly well-established National Association for the Advancement of Colored People (NAACP) branch and "some of the most aggressive and violent Klansmen in Alabama". Hank Thomas experienced a strange feeling as the bus arrived at the Anniston station shortly after 1 PM of that day. Before he knew it, the bus was being overrun by a mob of about 50 led by Klan leader William Chappell. The mob was armed with various weapons, and proceeded to throw things, smash windows, and attempt to cause harm to the riders of the bus. Anniston police took more time than necessary to arrive at the scene, but when they did, the bus was escorted to the city limits. As soon as city limits were passed, the police escorts left, and the mob (which had followed in cars and trucks) came upon the bus again. Two flat tires caused the bus to stop on the side of the road, leaving the riders open to the mob. A flaming bundle of rags was thrown through the window, causing the bus to catch fire. Thomas, as well as the other riders, was only able to make it out because the mob had dispersed when word of the bus possibly exploding got through the crowd.

Thomas was the first one to make it out of the burning bus. As he made his way out, a man asked "Are you all OK?" Before anyone could answer, the man smirked and struck Thomas in the head with a baseball bat. He fell to the ground and almost lost consciousness.

After a while, the crowd was finally broken up by a fuel tank explosion, and warning shots by the police. Although almost all of the Freedom Riders needed medical attention, the hospital they were taken to did not give them much help. Genevieve Hughes, another rider, made this statement about Hank Thomas' visit to the hospital after the incident: "I understand they did not do anything at all for Hank."

The first Freedom Ride ended shortly after the events in Anniston. Although Thomas was injured, and injected with a sense of fear, he participated in a second Freedom Ride from Montgomery, Alabama to Jackson, Mississippi ten days later. This time, he was incarcerated and served time at the Parchman State Prison Farm. Thomas was soon after released on bail, and on August 22, 1961, he became the first rider to appeal his conviction for the breach of peace. Although the Mississippi Supreme Court affirmed his conviction in 1964, the U.S. Supreme Court reversed in 1965.

After the Freedom Rides and the Vietnam War, Hank Thomas moved to Atlanta, which he thought was the best place for black middle-class at the time. Here, he became an entrepreneur, opening up a laundromat with his friend. Afterward, he worked his way up through the franchise business. First, he became the franchisee of a Burger King and two Dairy Queens, and eventually became the franchisee of six McDonald's restaurants. He currently owns four Marriott Hotels, two Fairfield Inns, and two TownePlace Suites.

== Achievements and recognition ==
Hank Thomas was honored at a Freedom Fighters Appreciation Banquet at the Willie Galimore Community Center in 1992. He is President of the Hayon Inc. Group, which owns three McDonald's franchises in Atlanta, and of Victoria Hospitality Properties Inc., which runs the four Marriott Hotels.

Thomas has served on the boards of the APEX Museum, the Butler Street YMCA, the Atlanta Youth Academy, and Atlanta's Boys and Girls Club. He was formerly a Vice Chair of the Piney Woods School in Jackson, Mississippi. He serves on the Board of Trustees of Talladega College and Morehouse Medical School. He is also part of the Mississippi Freedom Riders 50th Reunion Foundation, serving as the National Chair.

Hank Thomas received the "Buffalo Soldier" Award from Howard University in 2006. In 2011, he was inducted into the International Civil Rights "Walk of Fame", receiving the "For my People" Award. He also received the Rabbi Perry Nausbaum Civil Justice Award. In addition, Thomas has received the 365Black Award given by McDonald's Inc.

Thomas is still an activist engaged in his community. He is a lifetime member of the NAACP, and he and his wife Yvonne are parents of two and grandparents of four.
