= Genevieve Hughes =

American civil rights activist

- Born: July 14, 1932; Washington, D.C.
- Died: October 2, 2012 (aged 80); Murphysboro, Illinois, U.S.
- Other name: Genevieve Hughes Houghton
- Education: Cornell University
- Occupations: Financial analyst, activist
- Employer: Dun and Bradstreet

Genevieve Hughes Houghton ("HOW-ton"; 1932–2012) was known as one of three female participants in the original 13-person CORE Freedom Rides.

== Biography ==
Hughes grew up in the upper-middle-class suburban community of Chevy Chase, Maryland. She studied at Cornell University and, upon her graduation, moved to New York City to work as a stock analyst. In the late 1950s she became involved in the New York chapter of CORE, and she organized a boycott of dime stores that worked with chain restaurants that resisted the sit-in movements in the South. Hughes started to become ostracized from her colleagues on Wall Street, and she decided to work full time to end racism.

In fall of 1960 she took the position as CORE's field secretary and, in doing so, she was the first woman to serve on CORE's Field Staff. John Lewis spoke of her, "as graceful and gentle as her name" but, "not at all afraid to speak up when she had strong feelings about something." When explaining her decision to join the Freedom Rides she said, "I figured Southern women should be represented so the South and the nation would realize all Southern people do not think alike." During the journey from Washington, DC, to New Orleans, she and the other Freedom Riders encountered many acts of violence towards them, particularly in Anniston, Alabama, where their Greyhound bus was engulfed in flames by angry mobs. She recounts her experience in the Anniston hospital:

"There was no doctor at the hospital, only a nurse. They had me breathe pure oxygen but that only burned my throat and did not relieve the coughing. I was burning hot and my clothes were a wet mess. After awhile [sic] Ed and Bert were brought in, choking. We all lay on our beds and coughed. Finally, a woman doctor came in—she had to look up smoke poisoning before treating us. They brought in the Negro man who had been in the back of the bus with me. I pointed to him and told them to take care of him. But they did not bring him into our emergency room. I understand that they did not do anything at all for Hank. Thirteen in all were brought in, and three were admitted: Ed, the Negro man and myself. They gave me a room and I slept. When I woke up the nurse asked me if I could talk with the FBI. The FBI did not care about us, but only the bombing."

After her experience as a Freedom Rider she married John Houghton. The marriage ended in divorce. She continued to be active in movements for social justice, environmental protection, and world peace. In 1972 she was a co-founder and first director of the Women's Center in Carbondale, Illinois, one of the first shelters for women victims of domestic violence in the United States.

== Bibliography ==
- Arsenault, Raymond (2006), Freedom Riders: 1961 and the Struggle for Racial Justice, Oxford: Oxford University Press, ISBN 9780199755813
- "Biography: Genevieve Hughes Houghton, Freedom Rider, Washington, DC", Freedom Riders, American Experience, PBS Television, 2011
- "Genevieve Houghton: Obituary", The Southern Illinoisan, Oct 4–12, 2012
- Gross, Terry (Apr 8, 2011), "Get On the Bus: The Freedom Riders of 1961", Fresh Air, National Public Radio
- Hartford, Bruce, "Freedom Rides of 1961. We'll Never Turn Back: History & Timeline of the Southern Freedom Movement, 1951–1968" (PDF), Civil Rights Movement Archive
- "The Road to Change: Freedom Riders, 1961", The Birmingham News, Feb 26, 2006, archived from the original on 2010-12-27
