= 2022 in the United States =

- Decades: 2000s; 2010s; 2020s; 2030s
- See also: History of the United States (2016–present); Timeline of United States history (2010–present); List of years in the United States

The following is a list of events from the year 2022 in the United States.

Politically, the United States continued to be dominated by a culture war, with the issue of abortion gaining special attention amidst the Supreme Court's decision to overturn Roe v. Wade with its ruling on Dobbs v. Jackson Women's Health Organization, sparking protests across the country. America also saw labor unions gain increased traction, with Apple, Starbucks and Amazon among the most notable targets. In conjunction, increased attention to critical race theory, the instruction of gender identity in schools, and the ongoing investigations into both former president Donald Trump and the January 6th attack gained political attention. Mass shootings also became an increasingly common phenomenon, with 641 occurring in 2022 as of December 28, varying from those targeting schools (including the deadliest shooting of the year) to bias-motivated incidents which have targeted racial and sexual minorities.

In the economy, the United States remained heavily impacted by the global inflation surge, a simultaneous stock market decline and a heavy increase in gasoline prices, all partly due to Russia's invasion of Ukraine. America's largest tech companies were hit especially hard by the economy, with Meta Platforms in particular losing nearly $700 billion in valuation. The Federal Reserve gained increased attention with a series of its first aggressive interest rate hikes in years, a trend which continued in 2023, with the federal funds rate by year's end reaching 4.4%. 2022 also marked a period of acquisitions within the tech industry as well, notably Elon Musk's acquisition of Twitter and Microsoft's ongoing buyout of Activision Blizzard. Later in the year, the US saw the first major challenges to its gratuity culture; tipflation, as it has since become known, has caused Americans to lower their tips.

== Incumbents ==
=== Federal government ===
- President: Joe Biden (D-Delaware)
- Vice President: Kamala Harris (D-California)
- Chief Justice: John Roberts (Maryland)
- Speaker of the House: Nancy Pelosi (D-California)
- Senate Majority Leader: Chuck Schumer (D-New York)
- Congress: 117th

==== State governments ====
Governors and lieutenant governors

=== Governors ===
- Governor of Alabama: Kay Ivey (Republican)
- Governor of Alaska: Mike Dunleavy (Republican)
- Governor of Arizona: Doug Ducey (Republican)
- Governor of Arkansas: Asa Hutchinson (Republican)
- Governor of California: Gavin Newsom (Democratic)
- Governor of Colorado: Jared Polis (Democratic)
- Governor of Connecticut: Ned Lamont (Democratic)
- Governor of Delaware: John Carney (Democratic)
- Governor of Florida: Ron DeSantis (Republican)
- Governor of Georgia: Brian Kemp (Republican)
- Governor of Hawaii: David Ige (Democratic) (until December 5), Josh Green (Democratic) (since December 5)
- Governor of Idaho: Brad Little (Republican)
- Governor of Illinois: J. B. Pritzker (Democratic)
- Governor of Indiana: Eric Holcomb (Republican)
- Governor of Iowa: Kim Reynolds (Republican)
- Governor of Kansas: Laura Kelly (Democratic)
- Governor of Kentucky: Andy Beshear (Democratic)
- Governor of Louisiana: John Bel Edwards (Democratic)
- Governor of Maine: Janet Mills (Democratic)
- Governor of Maryland: Larry Hogan (Republican)
- Governor of Massachusetts: Charlie Baker (Republican)
- Governor of Michigan: Gretchen Whitmer (Democratic)
- Governor of Mississippi: Tate Reeves (Republican)
- Governor of Missouri: Mike Parson (Republican)
- Governor of Minnesota: Tim Walz (Democratic)
- Governor of Montana: Greg Gianforte (Republican)
- Governor of Nebraska: Pete Ricketts (Republican)
- Governor of Nevada: Steve Sisolak (Democratic)
- Governor of New Hampshire: Chris Sununu (Republican)
- Governor of New Jersey: Phil Murphy (Democratic)
- Governor of New Mexico: Michelle Lujan Grisham (Democratic)
- Governor of New York: Kathy Hochul (Democratic)
- Governor of North Carolina: Roy Cooper (Democratic)
- Governor of North Dakota: Doug Burgum (Republican)
- Governor of Ohio: Mike DeWine (Republican)
- Governor of Oklahoma: Kevin Stitt (Republican)
- Governor of Oregon: Kate Brown (Democratic)
- Governor of Pennsylvania: Tom Wolf (Democratic)
- Governor of Rhode Island: Daniel McKee (Democratic)
- Governor of South Carolina: Henry McMaster (Republican)
- Governor of South Dakota: Kristi Noem (Republican)
- Governor of Tennessee: Bill Lee (Republican)
- Governor of Texas: Greg Abbott (Republican)
- Governor of Utah: Spencer Cox (Republican)
- Governor of Vermont: Phil Scott (Republican)
- Governor of Virginia: Ralph Northam (Democratic) (until January 15), Glenn Youngkin (Republican) (since January 15)
- Governor of Washington: Jay Inslee (Democratic)
- Governor of West Virginia: Jim Justice (Republican)
- Governor of Wisconsin: Tony Evers (Democratic)
- Governor of Wyoming: Mark Gordon (Republican)

=== Lieutenant governors ===
- Lieutenant Governor of Alabama: Will Ainsworth (Republican)
- Lieutenant Governor of Alaska: Kevin Meyer (Republican) (until December 5), Nancy Dahlstrom (Republican) (since December 5)
- Lieutenant Governor of Arkansas: Tim Griffin (Republican)
- Lieutenant Governor of California: Eleni Kounalakis (Democratic)
- Lieutenant Governor of Colorado: Dianne Primavera (Democratic)
- Lieutenant Governor of Connecticut: Susan Bysiewicz (Democratic)
- Lieutenant Governor of Delaware: Bethany Hall-Long (Democratic)
- Lieutenant Governor of Florida: Jeanette Nunez (Republican)
- Lieutenant Governor of Georgia: Geoff Duncan (Republican)
- Lieutenant Governor of Hawaii: Josh Green (Democratic) (until December 5), Sylvia Luke (Democratic) (since December 5)
- Lieutenant Governor of Idaho: Janice McGeachin (Republican)
- Lieutenant Governor of Illinois: Juliana Stratton (Democratic)
- Lieutenant Governor of Indiana: Suzanne Crouch (Republican)
- Lieutenant Governor of Iowa: Adam Gregg (Republican)
- Lieutenant Governor of Kansas: David Toland (Democratic)
- Lieutenant Governor of Kentucky: Jacqueline Coleman (Democratic)
- Lieutenant Governor of Louisiana: Billy Nungesser (Republican)
- Lieutenant Governor of Maryland: Boyd Rutherford (Republican)
- Lieutenant Governor of Massachusetts: Karyn Polito (Republican)
- Lieutenant Governor of Michigan: Garlin Gilchrist (Democratic)
- Lieutenant Governor of Minnesota: Peggy Flanagan (Democratic)
- Lieutenant Governor of Mississippi: Delbert Hosemann (Republican)
- Lieutenant Governor of Missouri: Mike Kehoe (Republican)
- Lieutenant Governor of Montana: Kristen Juras (Republican)
- Lieutenant Governor of Nebraska: Mike Foley (Republican)
- Lieutenant Governor of Nevada: Lisa Cano Burkhead (Democratic)
- Lieutenant Governor of New Jersey: Sheila Oliver (Democratic)
- Lieutenant Governor of New Mexico: Howie Morales (Democratic)
- Lieutenant Governor of New York:
  - Brian Benjamin (Democratic) (until April 12)
  - Andrea Stewart-Cousins (Democratic) (acting: April 12 to May 25)
  - Antonio Delgado (Democratic) (since May 25)
- Lieutenant Governor of North Carolina: Mark Robinson (Republican)
- Lieutenant Governor of North Dakota: Brent Sanford (Republican)
- Lieutenant Governor of Ohio: Jon A. Husted (Republican)
- Lieutenant Governor of Oklahoma: Matt Pinnell (Republican)
- Lieutenant Governor of Pennsylvania: John Fetterman (Democratic)
- Lieutenant Governor of Rhode Island: Sabina Matos (Democratic)
- Lieutenant Governor of South Carolina: Pamela Evette (Republican)
- Lieutenant Governor of South Dakota: Larry Rhoden (Republican)
- Lieutenant Governor of Tennessee: Randy McNally (Republican)
- Lieutenant Governor of Texas: Dan Patrick (Republican)
- Lieutenant Governor of Utah: Deidre Henderson (Republican)
- Lieutenant Governor of Vermont: Molly Gray (Democratic)
- Lieutenant Governor of Virginia: Justin Fairfax (Democratic) (until January 15), Winsome Earle-Sears (Republican) (since January 15)
- Lieutenant Governor of Washington: Denny Heck (Democratic)
- Lieutenant Governor of Wisconsin: Mandela Barnes (Democratic)

== Elections ==
=== Midterm elections ===
The midterm elections were held on November 8, and all 435 voting seats of the House of Representatives, 35 seats in the Senate, 39 state and territorial gubernatorial elections, and numerous state and local elections were decided. Georgia's Senate election went to a runoff between Democrat incumbent Raphael Warnock and Republican challenger Herschel Walker a month later, which Warnock ultimately won.

- The Democratic Party maintained their lead in the Senate, retaining all seats previously held and picking up a Senate seat from Pennsylvania. Senators Chuck Schumer and Mitch McConnell are re-elected as Democratic and Republican leaders. With Patrick Leahy's retirement, Patty Murray is elected as the next president pro tempore of the Senate.
- The Republican Party retook the House of Representatives. GOP representatives, after an unprecedented 15 rounds of voting, elected Representative Kevin McCarthy of California's 20th district to succeed Nancy Pelosi.
- Democrats Katie Hobbs, Wes Moore and Maura Healey flip the governors seats in Arizona, Maryland, and Massachusetts respectively.
- Republican Joe Lombardo flips the governor's seat in Nevada.

==== Electoral milestones ====
- Sarah Huckabee Sanders in Arkansas, Maura Healey in Massachusetts, and Kathy Hochul in New York became the first elected female governors in their states, and Katie Britt is Alabama's first elected female senator. Healey also became the first lesbian governor in US history.
- Alex Padilla became California's first elected Latino senator, and Delia Ramirez is elected as Illinois' first Latina congresswoman.
- Summer Lee became Pennsylvania's first Black female representative in the House, and Wes Moore became Maryland's first Black governor.
- Maxwell Frost, at the age of 25, became the first member of Generation Z to be elected to Congress.
- Karen Bass became the first female mayor of Los Angeles.
- Patty Murray becomes the first female president pro tempore of the United States Senate.

=== Special elections and recalls ===
- A special election was held in Florida on January 11 to fill a vacancy in its 20th congressional district due to the death of Alcee Hastings on April 6, 2021. Democrat Sheila Cherfilus-McCormick wins the election with over 78% of the vote over Republican Jason Mariner.
- A special election was held in California to fill a vacancy in its 22nd congressional district on June 7 due to the resignation of Devin Nunes on January 1. Republican Connie Conway wins the election with over 50% of the vote over Democrat Lourin Hubbard.
- 2022 San Francisco District Attorney recall election: San Francisco District Attorney Chesa Boudin is successfully recalled and ousted from office, also on June 7. Mayor London Breed will name Boudin's successor once the results are certified by the elections office and approved by the board of supervisors.
- A special election was held in Texas on June 14 to fill a vacancy in its 34th congressional district due to the resignation of Filemon Vela Jr. on March 31. Republican Mayra Flores wins the election with over 50% of the vote over Democrat Dan Sanchez.
- A special election was held in Nebraska on June 28 to fill a vacancy in its 1st congressional district due to the resignation of Jeff Fortenberry on March 31. Republican Mike Flood wins the election with over 50% of the vote over Democrat Patty Pansing Brooks.
- A special election was held on August 9 to determine the representative for Minnesota's 1st congressional district after the death of Representative Jim Hagedorn due to kidney cancer in February 2022. Republican candidate Brad Finstad defeats Democratic candidate Jeff Ettinger to serve the remainder of Hagedorn's term.
- After the death of Representative Don Young (R, Alaska at large), Alaska elects Democrat Mary Peltola in the special election held on August 16, famously defeating former governor Sarah Palin.
- Two special elections were held in New York on August 23. The first is held in the 19th district to determine a successor for Antonio Delgado after he became New York's lieutenant governor. The special election is narrowly won by Democratic candidate Pat Ryan. The second is held in the 23rd district, vacated after Tom Reed resigned over accusations of sexual abuse and misconduct. Republican Joe Sempolinski wins the special election with 53.3 percent of the vote over Democrat Max Della Pia with 46.7 percent of the vote. Despite his victory in the special election, Sempolinski opts against running for reelection in the regular election to occur in November.
- After the death of Representative Jackie Walorski, Republican Rudy Yakym is elected to succeed her as representative of Indiana's 2nd congressional district. The special election was held concurrently with the Midterm elections.

== Ongoing events ==
- COVID-19 pandemic in the United States
- United States racial unrest (2020–2023)

== Events ==
=== January ===
- January 1
  - Eric Adams succeeds Bill de Blasio as the 110th Mayor of New York.
  - Public Domain Day: Following the 2018 enactment of the Music Modernization Act, all sound recordings fixed before 1923 enter the public domain in the U.S.; alongside that, books, films, and other works published in 1926 enter the public domain as well.
- January 3
  - Apple Inc. becomes the first publicly traded company to exceed a market value of $3 trillion.
  - Theranos CEO Elizabeth Holmes is found guilty of defrauding investors.
  - COVID-19 pandemic in the United States: The number of daily infections in America exceeds 1 million for the first time since the pandemic begin, with a total of 1.08 million reported cases, fueled by highly transmissible Deltacron hybrid variant.
- January 4 – Hundreds are stranded on I-95 between Richmond, Virginia and Washington, D.C. in a standstill for over 24 hours following heavy snowfall in Virginia.
- January 5 – Twelve people are killed and two others injured in a fire at a converted apartment complex in Philadelphia, Pennsylvania.
- January 6 – Cyber Ninjas, the company who conducted an audit of Maricopa County's election, announces that they will shut down after being held in contempt of court.
- January 7 – The three defendants convicted in the murder of Ahmaud Arbery are sentenced to life in prison. Both of the McMichaels are sentenced to life without the possibility of parole, while William Bryan is sentenced to life with the possibility of parole after 30 years.
- January 9 – Seventeen people are killed and at least 44 others injured in a fire at an apartment complex in The Bronx, New York City, New York.
- January 10
  - The United States Mint announces they have started shipping the first of the American Women quarters, starting with poet Maya Angelou, the first African American woman to be featured on a U.S. quarter.
  - 2022 College Football Playoff National Championship: Georgia defeats Alabama to win the national championship, its first since 1980.
  - The world's first successful heart transplant from a pig to a human patient is reported at University of Maryland Medical Center.
- January 12 – Federal judge Lewis A. Kaplan rules that one of Jeffrey Epstein's victims, Virginia Giuffre, can proceed with a civil case against Prince Andrew.
- January 13
  - COVID-19 vaccination in the United States: The Supreme Court blocks the Biden administration from enforcing its vaccine-or-test requirements for large private companies. However, it allows a vaccine mandate to stand for medical facilities that take Medicare or Medicaid payments.
  - Brianna Kupfer, a student at University of California, Los Angeles, was murdered in the furniture store where she was working in the Hancock Park neighborhood. Her murder attracted media attention.
- January 15
  - Glenn Youngkin is sworn in as governor of Virginia. Youngkin subsequently signs multiple executive orders, including barring the teaching of critical race theory in public schools, creating a commission to help fight against antisemitism, and enacting various measures to combat human trafficking.
  - A gunman takes multiple people hostage at Congregation Beth Israel, a Jewish synagogue in Colleyville, Texas. He is later shot and killed by police, with no other fatalities and all four hostages being rescued.
- January 18
  - Smartmatic announces that it has sued My Pillow CEO Mike Lindell for defamation, accusing him of defaming the company to sell pillows.
  - Microsoft purchases Activision Blizzard for US$68.7 billion. The deal is the largest acquisition of a tech company in history.
- January 19 – COVID-19 pandemic in the United States: The Biden Administration is reported to be freely providing 400 million N95 masks to Americans to help combat the COVID-19 pandemic.
- January 21
  - The University of Rhode Island moves to revoke the honorary degrees of Rudy Giuliani and Michael Flynn.
  - Intel announced plans to invest up to $100 billion in chip plants in Ohio.
- January 27–31 – The Northeast experiences a major blizzard which stretches from Delaware to Nova Scotia.

=== February ===
- February 1–9 – February 2022 North American winter storm: A major winter storm, known colloquially as Winter Storm Landon or the Groundhog Snowstorm, affects much of the eastern and Midwest from Texas to Maine, with Alabama receiving concurrent tornadoes as well.
- February 3 – The share price of Meta falls by 26.4%, with Facebook losing $230bn in its market value, the biggest one-day loss in history for a US company. This follows an earnings report showing the company's first ever drop in daily user numbers.
- February 4
  - The Death of Kyle Mullen takes place during the Navy SEAL's “Hell Week”.
  - COVID-19 pandemic in the United States: The cumulative death toll from the virus exceeds 900,000.
- February 7 – Freedom Convoy 2022: Protesters at the Ambassador Bridge, connecting Ontario with Detroit, Michigan, and one of the busiest international border crossings in North America, blockade the border crossing in response to vaccine mandates for truckers re-entering Canada. Four days later, on February 11, the Ontario Superior Court grants an injunction to remove protesters from the bridge.
- February 13 – 2021 NFL season: The Los Angeles Rams win Super Bowl LVI at SoFi Stadium, defeating the Cincinnati Bengals 23–20, the second consecutive Super Bowl won and played at one of the teams' home field.
- February 15 – NASA warns that sea levels in the U.S. may rise as much over the next 30 years as during the previous 100 years.
- February 16 – The killing of Jared Bridegan occurred in Jacksonville Beach, Florida.
- February 17 – Representative Jim Hagedorn dies at age 59 after a battle with kidney cancer.
- February 20 – In NASCAR, rookie Austin Cindric wins the Daytona 500 in the race's 65th running.
- February 23 – The Food and Drug Administration approves the first ever condom that is specifically designed for anal sex.
- February 24
  - The Dow Jones, Nasdaq, and S&P 500 fall sharply in response to Russia's full-scale invasion of Ukraine. Oil prices exceed $100 a barrel for the first time since 2014.
  - President Biden announces new, stronger sanctions that will "impose severe cost on the Russian economy, both immediately and over time." He condemns President Vladimir Putin's invasion of Ukraine, calling him an "aggressor".
- February 25 – President Biden nominates District of Columbia Circuit Court of Appeals Judge Ketanji Brown Jackson to fill the vacant Supreme Court seat following the retirement of Justice Stephen Breyer.
- February 26
  - President Biden signs an order to provide $600 million of military assistance to Ukraine.
  - The US and its allies commit to removing Russian banks from the SWIFT payment system, as well as imposing measures on the Russian Central Bank and further restrictions on Russian elites.

=== March ===
- March 1 – President Biden gives his first official State of the Union Address to Congress.
- March 3 – Biden signs a bipartisan law which bans motions to compel arbitration and class action waivers from being enforced in disputes involving sexual assault or harassment.
- March 8 – Proud Boys leader Enrique Tarrio is indicted on conspiracy charges of obstructing the U.S. Congress during the January 6 attack at the United States Capitol.
- March 10 – The 2022 MLB Lockout comes to an end after 99 days after a new CBA is agreed to, with the season delaying its start to April 7 but still playing all 162 games.
- March 11 – According to the CDC, United States declared the end of COVID-19 pandemic after two years of serious outbreak, for example: lifted all restrictions up and then the country's transition to the endemic phase from Deltacron hybrid variant.
- March 15
  - Amid Russia's ongoing invasion of Ukraine, the Senate passes a resolution condemning President Vladimir Putin as a war criminal.
  - Russia announces sanctions on several U.S. officials, banning President Joe Biden, Defense Secretary Lloyd Austin, former Secretary of State Hillary Clinton, and others from entering the country.
- March 21 – COVID-19 pandemic in Louisiana: New Orleans lifts its COVID-19 vaccine mandate for bars and restaurants.
- March 24 – In New York City, Mayor Eric Adams lifts the vaccine mandate for unvaccinated athletes from teams like New York Yankees, New York Mets, and Brooklyn Nets. This clears the way for many New York-based athletes to participate in home games.
- March 25 – In college basketball, Saint Peter's becomes the first 15th seed to advance to the Elite Eight following a 67-64 win against Purdue.
- March 26 – U.S. Rep. Jeff Fortenberry resigns from Congress after a California jury convicts him of lying to authorities about an illegal campaign donation from a foreign national, effective March 31.
- March 27 – The 94th Academy Awards, hosted by Regina Hall, Amy Schumer and Wanda Sykes, are held at Dolby Theatre in Los Angeles. Sian Heder's CODA is awarded Best Picture, along with an additional two awards, including Troy Kotsur for Best Supporting Actor. Denis Villeneuve's Dune receives the most awards with six, while Jane Campion's The Power of the Dog leads the nominations with twelve, with Campion winning Best Director. During the show, Will Smith slaps Chris Rock on stage, after the comedian makes a joke about his wife's alopecia; Smith later apologises. The telecast garners 60% stronger viewership than the 2021 ceremony with the slap, though still remains the second-least-viewed ceremony since Nielsen began keeping records, with 16.62 million viewers.
- March 28 – Florida Governor Ron DeSantis signs the Florida Parental Rights in Education Act, which among other provisions, would ban certain discussions about sexual orientation and gender identity in school classrooms from kindergarten to third grade. The law went into effect on July 1 and is known by its critics, especially supporters of the Democratic Party, as the Don't Say Gay bill.
- March 29 – President Joe Biden signs the Emmett Till Antilynching Act into law, which makes lynching a federal crime.
- March 30 – The United States Men's National Team qualifies for the 2022 World Cup in Qatar, their first appearance since the 2014 World Cup in Brazil.

=== April ===
- April 1
  - All data from the 1950 United States census is released to the public.
  - Amazon workers at the JFK8 in Staten Island vote 2,654–2,131 to form the Amazon Labor Union, making them the first workers to unionize.
- April 3 – A mass shooting occurs in Sacramento, California. Six people are killed and twelve others are injured; the gunmen remain at large.
- April 4 – In college basketball, the Kansas Jayhawks rally from a 16-point deficit to defeat the 8th-seeded North Carolina Tar Heels, 72–69, in the National Championship Game. This is the fourth championship for the Kansas Jayhawks men's basketball team, and their first since 2008.
- April 7
  - The Senate unanimously passes legislation to ban imports of oil, gas, and coal from Russia.
  - Ketanji Brown Jackson becomes the first Black woman confirmed as a Supreme Court Justice in a 53–47 vote.
- April 12
  - 2022 New York City Subway attack: Twenty-nine people are injured, 10 by gunfire, in a mass shooting at 36th Street station, in Brooklyn, New York.
  - 2022 Major League Baseball season: In baseball, San Francisco Giants assistant coach Alyssa Nakken becomes the first woman to coach on the field during a Major League Baseball regular season game during the team's matchup against the San Diego Padres.
  - Oklahoma Governor Kevin Stitt signs into law a near-total abortion ban, with the exception of cases when the mother's health is in danger. .
  - New York Lieutenant Governor Brian Benjamin resigns after being indicted for bribery, conspiracy to commit wire fraud, wire fraud, and two counts of falsifying campaign donation records.
  - South Dakota Attorney General Jason Ravnsborg is impeached over his 2020 car crash, in which he killed a pedestrian but initially said he might have struck a deer or another large animal.
- April 13
  - Abortion in the United States: A bill banning abortion after 15 weeks of gestation (styled on Mississippi's bill) and restricting its access to minors comes into force after the state legislature overrides the veto by Governor Andy Beshear.
  - Two people are killed and 200 homes are reportedly damaged during the McBride Fire in Ruidoso, New Mexico.
- April 16 – The inaugural 2022 USFL season begins with the Birmingham Stallions taking on the New Jersey Generals, marking the return of the USFL for the first time since 1985.
- April 18 – Federal judge Kathryn Kimball Mizelle strikes down the federal mask mandate on public transportation, ruling that the CDC failed to follow proper rule-making procedures.
- April 19 – Governor Ron DeSantis suggests that the state legislature revoke Disney World's special self-governing privileges over its 25,000-acre (10,000-hectare) property—privileges that were granted to the company in 1967. The move was generally interpreted as retaliation against Disney for opposing the state's Parental Rights in Education Act.
- April 23
  - 2022 Major League Baseball season
    - The Chicago Cubs defeat the Pittsburgh Pirates, 21–0, marking it the largest defeat in Pirates history and the largest victory in Cubs history.
    - Detroit Tigers slugger Miguel Cabrera becomes the 33rd member of the 3,000-hit club, and the first Venezuelan-born player to join.
- April 25 – After weeks of speculation, Elon Musk proposes to acquire social media website Twitter for $44 billion.
- April 28
  - The 2022 NFL draft is held in Las Vegas, with the Jacksonville Jaguars selecting former Georgia Bulldogs defensive end Travon Walker with the first overall-pick.
  - The Bureau of Economic Analysis releases data showing that in the first quarter of 2022 GDP declined at an annual rate of 1.4%, marking the first time GDP shrank since the second quarter of 2020.
- April 29 – Casey White prison escape: Assisted by prison guard Vicky White (no relation), both escape the Lauderdale County jail in Alabama.

=== May ===
- May 1 – The Global Methodist Church is officially launched by delegates representing the Wesleyan Covenant Association in Avon, Indiana. It was formed as a result of a schism within the United Methodist Church over doctrinal disagreements within the denomination.
- May 2
  - Fulton County District Attorney Fani Willis convenes a grand jury to start a process to decide whether to indict former President Donald Trump over his role in allegedly pressuring Secretary of State Brad Raffensperger to overturn Georgia's 2020 presidential election results.
  - A bombshell report by Politico leaks the Supreme Court's draft opinion for Dobbs v. Jackson Women's Health Organization. In the opinion, Associate Justice Samuel Alito writes a majority opinion overturning the landmark decisions in the cases of both Roe v. Wade and Planned Parenthood v. Casey, which would thereby remove constitutional protections for abortion access.
- May 3 – Chief Justice John Roberts responds to the bombshell report from the previous day by both confirming that the first draft of the opinion is authentic and ordering the Marshal of the Supreme Court to commence an investigation into the source of the leak.
- May 4 – The Federal Reserve raises its benchmark interest rate by half a percentage point from a range between 0.25 percent and 0.50 percent to a range between 0.75 percent to 1 percent, the biggest increase since May 2000.
- May 9 – Casey White prison escape: Casey White is caught in Evansville, Indiana alongside former corrections officer Vicky White during their prison break. Vicky later takes her own life and Casey is sent back to Alabama where he was being held. Casey's trial is scheduled to begin on December 12.
- May 10 – After over 20 years, Apple discontinues production of the iPod.
- May 12 – The United States Senate seeks to pass a bill of bipartisan support on sorely needed aid to Ukraine in the Russo-Ukrainian War. Senator Rand Paul blocks the bill from obtaining a speedy vote.
- May 13 – Federal judge Liles C. Burke blocks the implementation of a law in the state of Alabama that criminalizes prescribing gender-affirming puberty blockers and hormones to transgender minors.
- May 14
  - Across the country, in response to the Dobbs v. Jackson draft opinion leak, thousands of people protest in defense of abortion rights.
  - A shooting at a Tops Friendly Markets supermarket in Buffalo, New York leaves ten people dead. The 18-year-old gunman livestreamed the carnage on Twitch. Reports indicate that this was motivated by white supremacy and a manifesto shows that the gunman cites other white supremacist terrorists from past shootings. Once convinced against committing suicide, the suspect is promptly arrested.
- May 15 – A shooting at a Taiwanese church in Laguna Woods, California leaves one person dead. The suspect was arrested and authorities determined that the hate crime was motivated by tensions and disputes related to Political status of Taiwan and China.
- May 16
  - The Supreme Court rules that section 304 of the Bipartisan Campaign Reform Act of 2002, which limits the amount of money that can be donated to a campaign after an election for the purposes of repaying a political candidate who self-funded such campaign, is unconstitutional.
  - COVID-19 pandemic in the United States: An official death toll from COVID-19 in the United States exceeds 1 million people since the start of the pandemic.
- May 17 – The House of Representatives holds a hearing on UFOs, the first such hearing in over fifty years.
- May 18
  - An adult male in Massachusetts becomes the first person in the U.S. to be infected during a new outbreak of monkeypox, as growing case numbers are reported in several other countries.
  - President Biden invokes the Defense Production Act of 1950 to address a shortage of baby formula across the country.
- May 19
  - The Department of Energy announces a multibillion-dollar project to encourage the development of carbon dioxide removal technologies.
  - The Senate passes another US$40 billion in aid to Ukraine.
  - My Pillow CEO Mike Lindell is sanctioned by federal judge Carl J. Nichols for filing a frivolous lawsuit against Dominion Voting Systems and Smartmatic.
- May 20
  - A tornado touches down in Gaylord, Michigan, killing two people and injuring another 44 as well as leaving thousands without electricity and causing widespread property damage.
  - Tony Lorenzo Walker pleads guilty and is sentenced to 25 years in prison for the killing of Seth Smith in Berkeley, California.
- May 21 – Federal judge Robert R. Summerhays grants a nationwide preliminary injunction to a group of state attorneys general that sued the Biden administration over its plans to end Title 42, ruling that the federal government cannot end the policy while the broader legal challenge plays out in court.
- May 23
  - Anaheim mayor Harry Sidhu resigns due to an investigation by the FBI over various federal crimes.
  - The last public payphone is removed from New York City and transferred to a museum.
- May 24 – In one of the deadliest school shootings in American history, nineteen children and two adults are killed in a shooting at Robb Elementary School in Uvalde, Texas. The 18-year-old shooter is killed at the scene in a shootout with police.
- May 25
  - Acquisition of Twitter by Elon Musk: Twitter shareholders bring a class-action lawsuit against Elon Musk for market manipulation over his attempted acquisition of the social media platform.
  - Oklahoma Senate Bill 615 is signed into law; it is a bathroom bill which mandates that restrooms and similar facilities in schools must be segregated according to the sex on the student's original birth certificate.
- May 26
  - In response to the Robb Elementary School shooting, students around the country walk out of classes to protest inaction over gun violence on the part of the government.
  - The Southern Baptist Convention releases a lengthy list consisting of the identities of its ministers who had engaged in sexual abuse for more than a decade.
  - Broadcom announces it will purchase VMware in a $61 billion cash and stock deal, which becomes the second-largest M&A deal announced this year.
- May 27
  - Top Gun: Maverick, the sequel to the 1986 film Top Gun, is released in theaters to critical acclaim and massive commercial success, grossing nearly $1.5 billion worldwide.
  - The National Rifle Association of America holds its annual convention in Houston, Texas. In the wake of the shooting at Robb Elementary School three days earlier, the pro-gun convention is met with protests from local residents.
  - The Forest Service admits that it started the two forest fires that escalated into the largest wildfire in New Mexico state history. Governor Michelle Lujan Grisham is subsequently compelled to demand the federal government to take full responsibility for the disaster.
- May 29
  - The Department of Justice announces an investigation into the shooting at Robb Elementary School that happened five days earlier.
  - In IndyCar, Swede Marcus Ericsson wins the 106th Running of the Indianapolis 500.
- May 30 – Frontier is announced by Oak Ridge National Laboratory as the world's first exascale supercomputer.

=== June ===
- June 1
  - Depp v. Heard: A jury in Virginia finds both Amber Heard and Johnny Depp liable for defamation; Depp is awarded US$15 million while Heard is awarded US$2 million.
  - A grand jury in New York indicts Payton Gendron, the gunman in the mass shooting in Buffalo from the previous month, on both hate crime and terrorism charges.
- June 2
  - Former attorney Michael Avenatti is sentenced to four years in prison for defrauding Stormy Daniels.
  - Norm Pattis, defense attorney for far-right conspiracy theorist Alex Jones, asks to be dropped from the defamation case against his client over his conspiracy theories related to the 2012 Sandy Hook Elementary School shooting.
- June 3 – Former Trump aide Peter Navarro is indicted by a federal grand jury for "contempt of Congress" and defying a subpoena issued by the January 6 committee.
- June 4 – A mass shooting occurs along South Street in Philadelphia, Pennsylvania, leaving three people dead and thirteen others injured.
- June 5 – A mass shooting occurs in Chattanooga, Tennessee near a downtown bar in which three are killed and fourteen others are injured.
- June 6
  - A 24th lawsuit is filed in Harris County against Cleveland Browns quarterback Deshaun Watson over sexual misconduct allegations.
  - Attorney Thomas J. Henry files a lawsuit in a Texas district court on behalf of four families of victims in the Robb Elementary School shooting. Levied against the estate of the suspected gunman, the lawsuit is a part of the investigation into the massacre.
- June 8
  - Justice Brett Kavanaugh survives an attempted murder from California resident Nicholas John Roske. The FBI raids the home of Roske the next day.
  - Lawyers representing dozens of previously abused Olympic gymnasts announce that they intend to seek US$1 billion from the FBI. The basis for their lawsuit is that the agency failed to intervene against Larry Nassar when it was initially informed about the sexual abuse on the part of the former osteopathic physician that he committed while serving for years as the team doctor of the United States women's national artistic gymnastics team.
- June 9
  - The FBI arrests Michigan gubernatorial candidate Ryan Kelley and raids his home. His arrest and the raid on his home are predicated on misdemeanor charges for his participation in the January 6 Capitol attack.
  - The Supreme Court issues a decision in Egbert v. Boule which limits the ability to sue officials for violations of rights.
- June 10
  - COVID-19 pandemic: Biden administration announces that America has lifted COVID-19 testing restrictions for international travel.
  - Texas Federal judge Christopher Lopez dismisses the case of the bankruptcy protection for radio host and conspiracy theorist Alex Jones as his attempt to avoid the Sandy Hook lawsuits.
- June 11
  - Thirty-one Patriot Front members are arrested for conspiring to riot near a pride parade in the city of Coeur d'Alene, Idaho.
  - Thousands of people attend a rally on the National Mall in response to a recent surge in mass shootings.
- June 12 – The United States Senate reaches an agreement on a bipartisan gun control legislation.
- June 15
  - A widespread heat wave affects at least 120 million Americans in the central and southern regions of the country with several areas reaching 100 °F (38 °C) and thousands losing electricity.
  - Florida governor Ron DeSantis announces the reestablishment of the Florida State Guard over 70 years after it was disbanded in 1947 and names retired Marine Corps Lieutenant Colonel Chris Graham as its new director.
  - The Federal Reserve raises interest rates by 0.75%, the highest increase in interest rates since 1994.
- June 16
  - 2022 NBA Finals: the Golden State Warriors defeat the Boston Celtics in six games to win their fourth championship in eight years and seventh overall. Stephen Curry is named NBA Finals MVP.
  - In addition to the open letter, an investor in Dogecoin sues Elon Musk for US$258 billion over allegedly running a pyramid scheme.
  - FIFA officially names the sixteen venues to host matches during the 2026 World Cup, including eleven US venues.
- June 17
  - In a reversal from a 2018 decision, the Iowa Supreme Court holds that abortion is not a protected right in the state.
  - The Supreme Court rules that California's Private Attorneys General Act does not preempt the Federal Arbitration Act and therefore mostly allows for companies to compel claims brought under the act into arbitration if an arbitration clause exists with respect to the claim. The decision is widely seen as a win for corporations and employers.
- June 19 – The Republican Party of Texas holds its party's convention in Houston. Attendees approved many controversial resolutions, including the assertion that President Joe Biden "was not legitimately elected", calling for the full repeal of the Voting Rights Act of 1965, declaring homosexuality as "an abnormal lifestyle choice", as well as promoting Texan secession from the union.
- June 20 – President Biden calls on Congress to pass a three-month-long gas and diesel tax holiday as a proposal to lower the cost of fuel.
- June 21
  - The Supreme Court rules that Maine's exclusion of religious schools from tuition assistance programs violates the Free Exercise Clause of the First Amendment.
  - The South Dakota Senate votes to convict Attorney General Jason Ravnsborg on two impeachment charges relating to his fatal September 2020 car crash, thus removing him from office. He is the first official in South Dakota's history to be impeached and convicted.
  - An attorney for Cleveland Browns quarterback Deshaun Watson announces settlements in 20 of the 24 civil suits brought against him.
- June 23
  - The Supreme Court rules that New York's requirement for a need to carry a firearm in public violates the Second Amendment.
  - The Supreme Court also rules that law enforcement cannot be sued over Miranda rights violations. It does not overturn the 1966 case Miranda v. Arizona, but does weaken it to an extent.
  - The FBI raids the home of former Justice Department official Jeffrey Clark in connection to efforts to overturn the 2020 presidential election.
  - The Senate passes the Bipartisan Safer Communities Act, the first major gun reform legislation in decades. President Biden signs the bill into law on June 25.
  - The 2022 NBA draft is held at the Barclays Center in Brooklyn, New York, with the Orlando Magic selecting former Duke University player Paolo Banchero with the first overall pick.
- June 24
  - The Supreme Court rules that the Constitution does not confer a right to abortion, thus overruling the 1973 case Roe v. Wade, and its related 1992 case Planned Parenthood v. Casey. Protests erupt across nearly every major city in the United States.
  - The House passes the Bipartisan Safer Communities Act, which now requires President Biden's signature to become law.
  - The Arizona Senate is evacuated after police use tear gas to disperse a mob of pro-choice protesters in opposition to the overruling of Roe v. Wade and teachers, opposing an education funding bill after the rioters try to breach security and enter the Arizona State Capitol.
- June 26 – 2022 Stanley Cup Finals: The Colorado Avalanche defeat the Tampa Bay Lightning in six games to win their first Stanley Cup since the 2000–2001 season and third overall. Avalanche defenseman Cale Makar wins the Conn Smythe Trophy as playoffs MVP.
- June 27
  - The Supreme Court rules that schools and public employers cannot regulate employees exercising religion. The ruling in this case overturns that of the 1971 case Lemon v. Kurtzman, by the same court.
  - Police in Akron, Ohio shoot and kill Jayland Walker, a 25-year-old Black man, after a traffic stop. Walker is shot at nearly 90 times and hit with 46 bullets; his death is met with subsequent protests.
- June 28
  - The National Center for Education Statistics issues a report in which it finds that school shootings have risen to a 20-year high during the 2021–2022 academic year.
  - Ghislaine Maxwell receives a 20-year sentence for charges related to sex trafficking and sexual abuse.
  - Former House Rep. Jeff Fortenberry receives a two-year probation sentence for lying to the FBI regarding campaign finance violations.
  - The Nevada Supreme Court rules that ranked voting in the state is able to go to ballot, but both tax petitions and vouchers are unable to go to ballot.
- June 29 – The Supreme Court rules that states can prosecute non-tribal cases in Indian country, partially overturning a similar case in 2020.
- June 30
  - The Supreme Court rules that the Environmental Protection Agency is limited in its capacity to regulate power plants' carbon emissions under federal law.
  - The Supreme Court also allows the Biden administration to end the Trump-era Remain in Mexico policy.
  - Ketanji Brown Jackson is sworn into the Supreme Court, becoming the first Black woman to serve on the court.
  - Bitcoin falls below US$19,000 amid mounting pressure of economic concerns.
  - A mass shooting targeting police officers occurs in Allen, Kentucky, killing three officers and injuring three more, along with one non-officer. The alleged shooter is arrested and charged with murder and attempted murder of a police officer.

=== July ===
- July 1
  - The drug charges trial of Phoenix Mercury player Brittney Griner begins near Moscow, Russia.
  - A law in the state of Minnesota legalizing beverages and edibles which are infused with THC takes effect.
- July 4 – A mass shooting occurs at an Independence Day parade in Highland Park, Illinois. Seven people are killed and 25 others are injured.
- July 5
  - The Department of State appoints Richard Nephew as the leader of its initiative against global corruption.
  - New York Governor Kathy Hochul signs legislation to extend a two-year mayoral control over city schools into state law. The law itself was previously established in the state back in 2020.
  - 2022–23 NHL season: The San Jose Sharks hire Mike Grier as general manager, making him the first African American to serve as an NHL general manager.
- July 6
  - Senator Lindsey Graham vows to challenge a subpoena by a grand jury seeking his testimony in the criminal investigation about interference on the part of former President Donald Trump into the 2020 United States presidential election in Georgia.
  - New York judge Arthur Engoron fines the former appraiser of The Trump Organization US$10,000 per day until it complies with subpoenas filed against it by the state's Attorney General. This is made to supplement yesterday's ruling which held the organization in contempt of court for ignoring subpoenas by the office of the Attorney General for the state.
  - The Department of Justice reports that it is investigating potential violations of civil rights by the state of Texas in its multi-billion dollar border mission.
  - Nye County, Nevada becomes the first American county to offer ballots in the Shoshone language.
  - North Carolina Governor Roy Cooper signs an executive order to protect access to abortion by shielding out-of-state patients from extradition to other states as well as preventing state agencies from aiding such extradition.
- July 7
  - Derek Chauvin is sentenced to 21 years in federal prison over the murder of George Floyd.
  - Federal judge Jon S. Tigar issues a ruling that restores federal protections under the Endangered Species Act of 1973 that had been previously gutted by the Trump administration.
  - Theranos executive Sunny Balwani is found guilty on all 12 charges for defrauding Theranos patients and investors.
- July 8
  - The Wisconsin Supreme Court rules that putting an absentee ballot inside of an unlocked dropbox or giving it to someone else who will put it inside of an unlocked drop box is allowed, but putting it inside of a locked drop box is not allowed unless an election official is present when the ballot is placed.
  - Proposed acquisition of Twitter by Elon Musk: Musk attempts to formally terminate his US$44 billion agreement to buy Twitter. According to a statement that was filed with the Securities and Exchange Commission, the basis for dropping the deal is that the business that runs the social media platform has not lived up to its contractual obligations.
  - President Biden signs an executive order to protect access to abortion across the country in response to Dobbs v. Jackson.
- July 10 – President Biden says that he is considering the declaration of a public health emergency over the lack of access to abortion and weighing the possibility of funding by the federal government in response to the earlier decision of the Supreme Court on the matter.
- July 11
  - Jewelry worth $8.7–100 million is stolen from the trailer of a Brink's truck parked at a California truck stop, while one of the drivers was inside getting food and another slept in the back of the cab.
  - The first image from the James Webb Space Telescope is published by NASA.
  - The Massachusetts Supreme Judicial Court rules that voters will be allowed to use the state's expanded early and mail-in voting rules in the September primary.
- July 12
  - California Governor Gavin Newsom signs a bill to allow gun violence victims to sue the manufacturers of such guns.
  - Proposed acquisition of Twitter by Elon Musk: Twitter files suit against Musk in the Delaware Court of Chancery in an attempt to force Musk to complete the acquisition.
- July 13
  - Quest Diagnostics announces the nationwide availability of a diagnostic test for monkeypox, as the number of reported infections approaches 1,000 in the United States
  - Inflation rises to a record 9.1 percent.
- July 14 – Texas attorney general Ken Paxton sues the Department of Health and Human Services to prevent it from mandating that hospitals must perform abortions when the life of the mother is at risk, even if state law does not allow for such exception.
- July 15 – The International Olympic Committee announces that it will posthumously reinstate the gold medals that Native American Jim Thorpe had won in the 1912 Summer Olympics. The medals were previously stripped back in 1913 over violations of Olympic rules.
- July 16
  - The National Suicide Prevention Lifeline adopts the new three-digit N11 code of 9-8-8.
  - A video of a costumed performer dressed as Rosita at Sesame Place Philadelphia goes viral for the performer refusing to hug two Black girls while greeting a white girl, sparking outrage across the country. The park issued two apologies for the incident.
- July 17
  - A nearly eighty-page preliminary report into the Robb Elementary School shooting is released. The report concludes that "systemic failures" prompted the magnitude of the massacre at the school.
  - Federal judge Charles E. Atchley Jr. issues a preliminary injunction to block the enforcement of an executive order by the Biden administration which seeks to protect LGBT individuals from educational and workplace discrimination at the federal level of government.
- July 18 – The trial of former White House Chief Strategist Steve Bannon begins. Bannon faces criminal charges for contempt of Congress after defying the January 6 committee, which is investigating the 2021 United States Capitol attack.
- July 19
  - A protest about abortion at the Supreme Court building results in the arrests of seventeen lawmakers who attended the rally, including Representatives Alexandria Ocasio-Cortez and Ilhan Omar amongst others.
  - Proposed acquisition of Twitter by Elon Musk: In a win for Twitter, the Delaware Court of Chancery grants Twitter's request to expedite its lawsuit against Musk and hold a five-day trial in October.
  - The House passes the Respect for Marriage Act, which federally protects discrimination against LGBT individuals in what is widely seen as a defensive measure against Supreme Court justice Clarence Thomas questioning the legitimacy of Obergefell v. Hodges in his concurring opinion to Dobbs v. Jackson. Forty-seven Republicans joined the unanimous Democrat caucus.
- July 20
  - New York Supreme Court justice Thomas Farber orders Rudy Giuliani to appear before a grand jury in Fulton County, Georgia tasked with investigating possible illegal intervention in the 2020 presidential election.
  - OSHA opens its first federal investigation into Amazon after the death of one of its New Jersey warehouse workers during the company's Prime Day event.
  - DeSantis signed a bill allowing for veterans and active soldiers to apply for teaching jobs within then state without need for teaching credentials.
- July 21
  - The House votes to codify federal access to contraception, with eight Republicans supporting the measure.
  - In the country's first major cryptocurrency insider trading investigation, the SEC charges former Coinbase executive Ishan Wahi and two others with wire fraud and conspiracy to commit wire fraud.
  - The United States' first polio case in nearly 10 years is reported in Rockland County, New York.
- July 22
  - Steve Bannon is found guilty of contempt of Congress after defying subpoenas by the January 6 committee. The guilty verdict is the first successfully prosecuted case of contempt of Congress since the Watergate scandal.
  - Newsom signs Senate Bill 1327 into law. Modeled after the Texas Heartbeat Act, the law enables private citizens to bring civil action against anyone who manufactures, distributes, transports or imports assault weapons or ghost guns, for a minimum of $10,000 as well as attorneys fees.
  - Vince McMahon announces he will be stepping down as the head of WWE after hush money and sexual harassment allegations. He will be succeeded by his daughter Stephanie and WWE president Nick Khan as interim co-CEOs.
- July 24
  - Newsom declares a state of emergency over the Oak Fire in Yosemite National Park.
  - The July–August 2022 United States floods begin.
- July 26 – Attorney General Merrick Garland announces that the Department of Justice is investigating Donald Trump's actions in relation to the January 6 United States Capitol attack.
- July 27
  - In a reversal, Senator Joe Manchin announces he has reached a deal with Senate Majority Leader Schumer on taxes and climate.
  - The Senate passes the bipartisan CHIPS and Science Act by a vote of 64–33, which allocates $280 billion in funding for scientific development and increasing the nation's competitive ability against mainland China. Notably, $52 billion would go towards the development of integrated circuits and semiconductor fabrication plants. The House passes the bill the following day in a mostly-partisan vote, and Biden signs the bill on August 9.
  - The Federal Reserve raises interest rates by 0.75% for the second time in a row, in an attempt to combat a historic inflation surge. The Dow Jones, S&P, and Nasdaq Composite all close higher this day.
  - Spirit Airlines shareholders vote to pull out of a merger agreement with Frontier Airlines. The airline announces its merger with JetBlue during the following day.
- July 28
  - China–United States relations – President Biden speaks virtually with Chinese President Xi Jinping amid rising tensions and House Speaker Nancy Pelosi's expected visit to Taiwan. The two leaders discussed Taiwan, the ongoing Russian invasion of Ukraine, and the global economy.
  - A series of flash floods in parts of Eastern Kentucky kill 37 people.
  - The Department of Education announces that it plans to cancel student loans en masse, but the decision of implementation lies with President Biden.
- July 29
  - West Nile virus in the United States: Colorado reports their first West Nile virus of this year in a person from Delta County.
  - 2022 monkeypox outbreak: New York Governor Kathy Hochul declares a state emergency over monkeypox, as the number of cases in New York reaches 1,383. This is more than a quarter of the 5,189 total cases in the U.S.

=== August ===
- August 1
  - The Central Intelligence Agency conducts a drone strike in Afghanistan, killing al-Qaeda leader Ayman al-Zawahri.
  - A defendant who was convicted on charges related to the January 6 Capitol attack receives a seven-year prison sentence, then the longest sentence to date for a defendant regarding the riots.
  - 2022 monkeypox outbreak: California and Illinois declare a state of emergency over the monkeypox outbreak, following New York the previous week.
- August 2
  - Taiwan–United States relations – House Speaker Nancy Pelosi becomes the highest-ranking U.S. official in the last 25 years to visit Taiwan, despite warnings from both China and Biden of rising tensions.
  - Kansas citizens vote to reject a proposed amendment to the state constitution that would remove protections for abortion rights.
  - The Department of Justice sues Idaho for its ban on abortion being a violation of the Emergency Medical Treatment and Active Labor Act. When announcing the lawsuit, Attorney General Garland argues that Idaho's abortion ban prevents doctors from aborting pregnancies even if the health of the mother is put into jeopardy.
  - A bombshell report argues that Equifax issued wrong credit scores to millions of Americans this past spring to a point where interest rates and mortgage loans were altered.
  - The Senate passes the PACT Act in an 86–11 vote, which expands veteran health care to cover injuries from burn pits. Biden signs the law eight days later.
- August 3
  - In a widely watched lawsuit, radio host and conspiracy theorist Alex Jones concedes that the Sandy Hook Elementary School shooting was "100% real" after meeting the members of the victims' families yesterday. Jones is later ordered by a jury to pay at least US$4.1 million in compensatory damages and an additional $45.2 million in punitive damages to Neil Heslin and Scarlett Lewis, parents of victim Jesse Lewis.
  - U.S. Representative Jackie Walorski dies in a car crash along with two of her staffers.
  - The Senate votes to ratify Sweden and Finland into NATO.
  - President Biden signs another executive order encompassing various abortion access protections.
  - Eleven LIV Golf players led by Phil Mickelson file a lawsuit against PGA Tour, accusing it of being an illegal monopoly over professional golf.
- August 4
  - Phoenix Mercury star Brittney Griner is found guilty on drug charges in a Russian court and is subsequently sentenced to nine years in prison.
  - The Justice Department announces federal charges against four of the police officers involved in the killing of Breonna Taylor.
  - The US declares a national health emergency over the 2022 monkeypox outbreak.
  - Florida governor Ron DeSantis suspends Tampa state prosecutor Andrew Warren over his refusal to enforce Florida's abortion ban.
  - A judge orders Kevin Spacey to pay US$31 million to House of Cards producers for the costs involved in removing him from the series following sexual misconduct allegations against him.
- August 5
  - The July jobs report is released, showing that the national unemployment rate fell to 3.5% along with the economy adding 528,000 new jobs. The data far surpass economists' expectations.
  - China–United States relations – China sanctions Speaker Pelosi in retaliation over her visit to Taiwan.
  - The Rappahannock tribe reacquires its ancestral land in Virginia after 400 years.
- August 6 – The New York State Department of Health warns that hundreds of people might be infected with polio.
- August 7 – The Senate passes the Inflation Reduction Act of 2022 in a 51–50 vote with Vice-President Kamala Harris breaking the tie for its passage. Biden signs the bill into law later in the month.
- August 8 – FBI search of Mar-a-Lago: The FBI executes a search warrant on Mar-a-Lago, the Florida home of former President Donald Trump, seeking boxes of classified documents that Trump allegedly took from the White House.
- August 9 – A three-judge panel on the United States Court of Appeals for the District of Columbia Circuit makes a unanimous ruling that Donald Trump's tax records can be transferred by law enforcement from the IRS to the United States House Committee on Ways and Means.
- August 10
  - Former President Trump invokes the Fifth Amendment with regard to a deposition by New York Attorney General Letitia James.
  - The consumer price index report is released showing that inflation rose by 8.5% that month, which is less than expected and considered a sign inflation is easing.
  - 2022 monkeypox outbreak: The number of reported cases nationwide exceeds 10,000.
- August 11
  - The national average gas price has dropped below $4 per US gallon for the first time since March.
  - FBI search of Mar-a-Lago: Attorney General Merrick Garland and the Department of Justice moves to unseal the search warrant used to seize documents from Mar-a-Lago.
  - The NBA announces the retirement of the number 6 leaguewide to honor the late Bill Russell, a first for the league.
  - The United States Postal Service announces that it will raise prices for postage starting in October for holiday shipping. The rate hikes will return to normal levels in January 2023.
- August 12
  - Author Salman Rushdie is attacked by a man during an on-stage interview at the Chautauqua Institution in Chautauqua, New York. The suspect is arrested at the scene and is charged with attempted murder the following day.
  - FBI search of Mar-a-Lago: The Department of Justice wins its bid to unseal the search warrant against Donald Trump, revealing that the former president had stored documents regarding nuclear weapons at Mar-a-Lago, which prompts the Justice Department to place him under investigation for alleged violations of federal statutes such as the Espionage Act of 1917 and the Presidential Records Act of 1978.
  - State supreme courts in Idaho and Louisiana defend abortion bans, with Idaho's ruling that its near-total abortion ban can go into effect beginning on August 25, and Louisiana's rejecting an appeal to overturn its ban.
  - OSHA opens its second investigation into Amazon following the deaths of two more people at the company's warehouses.
  - The Southern Baptist Convention says that some of its major parts are facing investigations by the Department of Justice with regard to revelations of widespread sexual abuse by the clergy.
  - San Diego Padres shortstop Fernando Tatís Jr. is suspended for 80 games for violating Major League Baseball's policy on performance-enhancing drugs.
- August 13
  - The Great Lakes Water Authority issues an advisory in Michigan for people to boil their drinking water after a crack opens in a critical pipe. Nearly one million people across twenty-three communities are affected.
  - FBI search of Mar-a-Lago: armed Trump supporters protest the operation outside of the FBI building located in Phoenix, Arizona.
- August 14 – Taiwan–United States relations – A congressional delegation led by Senator Ed Markey visits Taiwan.
- August 15
  - More than 13,000 Home Run Inn pizzas are recalled by the federal government for being potentially tainted with metal.
  - Thousands of Capri Sun pouches are also recalled by The Kraft Heinz Company over the possible contamination with a cleaning solution.
- August 16
  - In a nationwide effort known as Operation Cross Country, the FBI rescues more than 200 people, including 84 children, who are victims of human trafficking.
  - U.S. Representative Liz Cheney loses her Wyoming seat to Trump-backed candidate Harriet Hageman.
  - Pennsylvania Governor Tom Wolf signs an executive order to ban the practice of conversion therapy in the state.
- August 17
  - The Centers for Disease Control and Prevention announces an overhaul of operations so that the agency can respond to a crisis in public health more quickly than before.
  - Kids for cash scandal: Two former judges who orchestrated a scheme to send children to for-profit jails are ordered by federal judge Christopher C. Conner to pay more than US$200 million to hundreds of people they victimized.
  - Federal judge Dan A. Polster rules that Walgreens, CVS, and Walmart must pay US$650 million to two Ohio counties for their responsibility in the opioid epidemic.
- August 18
  - Allen Weisselberg, the Chief Financial Officer of The Trump Organization, pleads guilty to tax violations.
  - FBI search of Mar-a-Lago: Federal judge Bruce Reinhart allows a portion of the affidavit that formed the basis for the raid to be unsealed.
  - Starbucks unions: Federal judge Sheryl H. Lipman rules that Starbucks must reinstate fired employees in Tennessee who attempted to unionize.
  - Cleveland Browns quarterback Deshaun Watson is suspended for 11 games for the 2022 NFL season and is fined $5 million by the NFL.
- August 19 – A Michigan judge blocks county prosecutors from enforcing the state's 1931 ban on abortion.
- August 22
  - Infectious disease expert Anthony Fauci announces that he will retire at the end of the year.
  - FBI search of Mar-a-Lago: Donald Trump sues the federal government over the law enforcement raid in an attempt to have a neutral third party review the documents acquired in the search.
  - Oracle is sued in a class action lawsuit alleging that the company has operated and profited off of a "surveillance machine" monitoring 5 billion people.
- August 24
  - President Biden announces that he will cancel US$10,000 in student loans for all borrowers who earn under $125,000 per year, and an additional $10,000 for those who received Pell Grants.
  - Utah sues the federal government over restoring the size of two Indigenous national monuments after they were downsized by former president Trump.
  - Federal judge B. Lynn Winmill rules that Idaho's abortion ban partially violates federal law.
- August 25
  - California announces a ban on the sale of new gasoline cars after 2035.
  - Dominion Voting Systems files motions to depose multiple Fox News personalities in its defamation lawsuit against the network, including Tucker Carlson, Sean Hannity, and Jeanine Pirro.
  - A North Dakota judge blocks the state's ban on abortion one day before it is set to go into effect.
- August 26
  - FBI search of Mar-a-Lago: The Department of Justice reveals the partially redacted affidavit to justify the raid.
  - Moderna files a patent infringement against Pfizer and BioNTech with regard to both companies' jointly-developed COVID vaccine.
- August 27 – Football punter Matt Araiza is cut from the Buffalo Bills in light of gang rape allegations and a subsequent lawsuit.
- August 29–September 11 – 2022 US Tennis Open. The 142nd running of the tournament, Carlos Alcaraz and Iga Świątek take home championships in the men's and women's running of the tournament respectively.
- August 29
  - Capitol rioter and Proud Boys member Joshua Pruitt is sentenced to 55 months in prison, the largest sentence given out to that point.
  - Jackson, Mississippi, enacts a state of emergency over lower water pressure and water infrastructure failure.
  - California's legislature passes the FAST Recovery Act (AB 257), which in multiple methods sets to improve working conditions and raise wages for fast-food workers.
- August 30
  - Texas reports an immunocompromised patient has suffered the first US death in the monkeypox outbreak.
  - Bad Bunny becomes the first non-English speaking artist to win the MTV Video Music Awards' artist of the year award.
- August 31
  - A Gallup poll finds that more Americans are smoking cannabis than cigarettes for the first time in the nation's history.
  - Federal judge James D. Peterson rules that Wisconsin voters with disabilities can designate a person to help them to return their ballots.

=== September ===
- September 1
  - FBI search of Mar-a-Lago: Federal judge Aileen Cannon orders a more detailed list of property seized by the FBI during the raid. She releases a detailed list of what was seized the following day.
  - A former NYPD officer who participated in the January 6 Capitol attack is sentenced to 10 years in prison for assaulting a Capitol police officer.
  - President Biden delivers a primetime speech at Independence Hall blasting Donald Trump and his movement, claiming Trump is "determined to take this country backwards".
- September 2
  - The August jobs report is released, showing that Americans by and large are generally re-entering the workforce. Unemployment rises to 3.7 percent.
  - Starbucks unions: New York City sues the coffee giant for firing a union organizer.
- September 4 – Cloudflare blocks access to Kiwi Farms due to an increase in threats posted on the site, a move which eventually leads to the site's takedown.
- September 5
  - FBI search of Mar-a-Lago: Federal judge Cannon grants Donald Trump's request to appoint a special master to review the documents.
  - A series of floods wrack both Indiana and Georgia, killing at least one.
- September 6
  - Due to his role in January 6 Capitol attack, a state judge in New Mexico removes an Otero County commissioner and permanently bars him from holding future office.
  - The Mosquito Fire, California's largest wildfire this season, ignites, destroying 78 buildings. Pacific Gas and Electric is currently under a criminal investigation by the Forest Service and subject to various civil suits.
- September 7
  - Former President and First Lady Barack and Michelle Obama's official portraits are unveiled.
  - Michigan judge Elizabeth L. Gleicher rules that the state's criminal ban on abortion is unconstitutional.
  - Las Vegas police arrest Clark County public administrator Robert Telles in connection with the alleged murder of investigative journalist Jeff German.
  - Federal judge Reed O'Connor issues a ruling that the Affordable Care Act's requirement to cover HIV-prevention drugs are unconstitutional.
  - 2022 Memphis shootings: Four people are killed and three others are injured in a four-hour shooting spree that was streamed on Facebook Live.
- September 8
  - The NFL season kicks off with the defending Super Bowl LVI champion Los Angeles Rams hosting the Buffalo Bills in the NFL Kickoff Game in Los Angeles.
  - Steve Bannon surrenders to prosecutors in New York over fraud charges.
  - President Biden orders flags at half staff for ten days in response to the death of Queen Elizabeth II and pays tribute to the late monarch, calling her "a stateswoman of unmatched dignity and constancy who deepened the bedrock alliance between the United Kingdom and the United States." Many other U.S. politicians offer their tributes including former presidents.
- September 9 – Federal judge Donald M. Middlebrooks dismisses Donald Trump's lawsuit against Hillary Clinton.
- September 10 – Visa, Mastercard, and American Express all announce gun sales on their payment systems will be separately categorized and be easier to track, a win for gun control advocates.
- September 11 – President Biden delivers a speech remembering the 9/11 terrorist attacks and its victims on the twenty-first anniversary of the event.
- September 12
  - The largest strike of private sector nurses in the history of the country begins in Minnesota.
  - The 74th Primetime Emmy Awards are held at the Microsoft Theater and hosted by Kenan Thompson. The top prizes go to The White Lotus, Succession, and Ted Lasso.
- September 13
  - The Dow Jones Industrial Average drops 1,276 points, or just under 4%, after an August inflation report, effectively erasing a recent period of rising stocks.
  - West Virginia passes a near-total abortion ban in both houses of its legislature. Governor Jim Justice signs the bill into law on September 16.
  - Senator Lindsey Graham introduced legislation that would ban abortion nationwide after 15 weeks of pregnancy with exceptions for rape, incest, and the life of the patient.
- September 14
  - Amtrak announces that it is suspending all long-distance routes in preparation for a possible railroad strike.
  - Mortgage loans hit a nationwide average interest rate of 6% for the first time since 2008.
  - California sues Amazon for violations of its antitrust and unfair competition laws.
  - Martha's Vineyard migrant airlift: Florida governor Ron DeSantis sends about fifty migrants from Florida to Massachusetts in what observers describe as a "political stunt" by the governor. Despite being told that they were bound for the city of Boston, the migrants instead arrive on the island of Martha's Vineyard.
- September 15
  - The Consumer Financial Protection Bureau announces that it will begin to regulate buy now, pay later companies.
  - Uber suffers a data breach of its internal servers.
- September 17
  - President Biden travels to London, UK, to attend the funeral of Queen Elizabeth II the following day.
  - Air New Zealand launches the first non-stop flight between Auckland and New York City's JFK airport.
- September 18 – Hurricane Fiona hits Puerto Rico as a Category 1 hurricane, flooding the landscape, destroying the power grid, and wrecking other infrastructure across the entire island.
- September 19 – The US and Taliban complete a prisoner exchange, with American contractor Mark Frerichs being freed in exchange for the US releasing drug trafficker Bashir Noorzai.
- September 20 – Martha's Vineyard migrant airlift: Migrants file a class action lawsuit against Governor DeSantis.
- September 21
  - New York attorney general Letitia James files a $250 million civil fraud suit against Donald, Donald Jr., Eric, and Ivanka Trump, as well as The Trump Organization.
  - The Federal Reserve hikes interest rates for the third time by 0.75% to combat the ongoing inflation surge.
  - The House votes to amend the Electoral Count Act in response to the January 6 attack.
  - FBI search of Mar-a-Lago: A three-judge panel on the 11th circuit rules that the Justice Department can regain access to the classified records seized during trial.
- September 22
  - Murder of George Floyd: Former Minneapolis police officer Thomas Lane is sentenced to three years in prison for aiding and abetting manslaughter.
  - FedEx announces it will raise shipping rates by approximately 7-8%.
  - Federal judge Diane Humetewa rules that the subpoena by January 6th Committee to get the cell phone data from Arizona Republican Party chairwoman Kelli Ward and her husband can proceed.
- September 26 – NASA's Double Asteroid Redirection Test successfully collides with an asteroid.
- September 28 – Hurricane Ian makes landfall in Florida, directly hitting the Fort Myers area as a Category 4 storm on the Saffir–Simpson scale. Florida's Sanibel and Pine Islands are cut off from the mainland, and Ian becomes the deadliest hurricane to hit the state since 1935 and the country since 2005's Hurricane Katrina.
- September 29
  - Highland Park parade shooting: The families of the victims file lawsuits against the manufacturer of the firearm that was used to commit the shooting, two gun stores, the father of the shooter, and the shooter himself.
  - The Department of Education partly reverses its earlier decision to forgive student loans.
- September 30 – 2022 Major League Baseball season: The Seattle Mariners make the playoffs following a game-winning home run from Cal Raleigh, ending their 21-year playoff drought.

=== October ===
- October 2 – The USPS increases its shipping rates until January 22, 2023.
- October 3 – The SEC collects a fine of over US$1 million from Kim Kardashian over promoting cryptocurrency on her Instagram page.
- October 4
  - In baseball, Aaron Judge hits his 62nd home run this season, passing Roger Maris' American League record.
  - Micron announced an investment of up to $100 billion to build a Megafab in Central New York.
- October 5 – A three-judge panel on the United States Court of Appeals for the Fifth Circuit rules that DACA is illegal, but it allows the policy to be left intact for close to 600,000 migrants.
- October 6
  - President Biden pardons all federal offenses of simple marijuana possession.
  - Federal judge Emmet G. Sullivan rules that Postmaster General Louis DeJoy's changes to the USPS prior to the 2020 United States presidential election had harmed USPS mail delivery. The 65-page decision also puts countermeasures in place to prevent DeJoy from implementing such changes ever again.
- October 7
  - Robb Elementary School shooting: The Uvalde Consolidated Independent School District suspends its entire police force, and the superintendent resigns several hours later.
  - The Arizona Court of Appeals blocks enforcement of the state's abortion ban.
- October 10 – President of the Los Angeles City Council Nury Martinez resigns from her position as president while continuing to be a council member due to leaked audio of racist remarks on her own part. She would then go on to resign from her council seat two days later.
- October 11 – NASA confirms that the Double Asteroid Redirection Test (DART) mission was successful in its ultimate goal. Dimorphos was knocked out of its orbit by thirty-two minutes, much more than the ten minutes that the space agency anticipated.
- October 12 – Alex Jones is ordered by a jury in Connecticut to pay US$965 million to the families of the victims in the Sandy Hook Elementary School shooting due to his promotion of conspiracy theories in regards to the mass shooting. It is the largest payout that has ever been incurred by a civil defendant in the history of the state.
- October 13
  - The Social Security Administration announces an 8.1% cost of living adjustment to begin in 2023, citing ongoing inflation. It is the largest increase since 1981.
  - The Supreme Court declines Trump's request for it to intervene in the FBI search of Mar-a-Lago.
  - Immediately subsequent to its final public hearing before the midterms, the January 6th Committee votes to subpoena former president Trump. The subpoena is formally issued on October 21.
  - Proposed acquisition of Twitter by Elon Musk: The federal government initiates an investigation into Elon Musk over his conduct in the attempt to acquire the social media platform.
  - For the first time in the history of the state, the Alaska Department of Fish and Game cancels the winter snow crab season in the Bering Sea.
  - Federal judge Joseph Robert Goodwin blocks a federal law which prohibits the possession of a firearm with a tampered serial number.
  - A spree shooting occurs in a suburban neighborhood of Raleigh, North Carolina. Five people are killed, and two others are injured. The suspect is detained after being cornered by police at a nearby residence.
- October 17
  - Kanye West announces he is purchasing the social media network Parler after being suspended by Twitter and Meta Platforms. He later pulled out of the acquisition, though, on December 2.
  - President Biden announces the launch of the website for student loan debt forgiveness.
- October 18 – The Office of Science and Technology Policy initiates a five-year plan to research methods against global warming by reflecting light from the Sun away from the planet.
- October 19 – In a legal defeat for Donald Trump, federal judge David O. Carter orders emails between John Eastman and Trump to be turned over to House investigators.
- October 21 – Federal judge Carl J. Nichols sentences Steve Bannon to four months in jail and a fine of $6,500 for willfully disobeying a subpoena as part of the January 6 commission.
- October 22 – Federal judge Henry Autrey issues a stay to temporarily block President Biden's student loan debt forgiveness.
- October 24
  - Four teenagers aged 14 to 17 are killed in a car accident involving a stolen Kia Sportage at the entrance to westbound Route 198 from westbound Route 33 in Buffalo, New York. The Buffalo police says that the accident is linked to an ongoing TikTok challenge involving the theft of multiple Kia and Hyundai vehicles.
  - A gunman opens fire at Central Visual and Performing Arts High School, killing a student and a teacher, and injuring 4 others before being shot and killed by police.
- October 26
  - Gretchen Whitmer kidnapping plot: A jury in Michigan issues guilty verdicts for three men who aided in the kidnapping plot.
  - Meta Platforms reports another earnings miss, losing 23% of its market value the next trading day. Meta CEO Mark Zuckerberg subsequently announces mass layoffs for 11,000 employees the following month, or 13% of its entire workforce.
- October 27
  - Elon Musk completes his $44 billion acquisition of Twitter.
  - A federal three-judge panel in D.C. rules that Trump's tax returns must be delivered to House investigators. The returns are delivered to the House Committee on Ways and Means on November 30.
- October 28 – Speaker Pelosi's husband Paul is attacked during an early morning break-in at the couple's San Francisco residence.
- October 31
  - Indiana State Police announces the arrest of a suspect in the murders of Abigail Williams and Liberty German.
  - Federal judge Florence Y. Pan blocks the merger of Penguin Random House and Simon & Schuster.

=== November ===
- November 2
  - The Federal Reserve hikes interest rates by 0.75% to 3.75-4%, their highest levels since 2008.
  - Nikolas Cruz is sentenced to thirty-four life sentences for committing the Stoneman Douglas High School shooting back in 2018.
- November 5
  - The Houston Astros win the 118th World Series against the Philadelphia Phillies in six games.
  - Los Angeles FC wins the 2022 MLS Cup, beating the Philadelphia Union in penalties.
- November 7 – A single ticket in Altadena, California, wins a world record $2.02 billion Powerball jackpot.
- November 8 – 2022 United States elections: The Republicans gain 9 seats to take control of the House of Representatives, but lose one seat in the Senate.
- November 10
  - DC Attorney General Karl Racine files suit against the NFL, commissioner Roger Goodell, the Washington Commanders, and Commanders owner Daniel Snyder, claiming that the parties deceived DC residents on a recent toxic culture investigation.
  - Alex Jones is further ordered to pay an additional US$473 million to the Sandy Hook victims' families.
- November 11 – FTX, amidst its collapse, files for Chapter 11 bankruptcy protection.
- November 12 – 2022 Dallas airshow mid-air collision: Two World War II-era planes collide in mid-air at the Wings Over Dallas airshow, killing six people.
- November 13
  - A mass shooting occurs at the University of Virginia in which three people are killed, and two others are injured. The suspect is arrested and charged with three counts of second degree murder as well as three counts of using a handgun in the alleged commission of a felony.
  - A mass stabbing occurs in Moscow, Idaho in which four University of Idaho students are killed in off-campus housing.
- November 14 – The Department of Transportation fines six airlines a combined $7.25 million for extreme delays in processing passenger refunds.
- November 15
  - Georgia's abortion ban is temporarily overturned by one of its Fulton County courts, though reinstated on November 23.
  - Federal judge Emmet G. Sullivan rules that Title 42 expulsion is a violation of the Administrative Procedure Act and no longer enforceable.
  - Former President Trump announces he's running for president again in the 2024 election.
- November 16
  - NASA launches Artemis 1 after a series of delays, the maiden flight for the Space Launch System.
  - Yale and Harvard's law schools both pull out of the U.S. News college rankings in what is seen as the list's biggest challenge yet.
  - Congress passes the Speak Out Act, which bans non-disclosure agreements in events of sexual assault.
  - The FDA approves a cultured meat product for the first time.
- November 17 – NASA concludes its LOFTID test, stating it to be a "huge success".
- November 18
  - Elizabeth Holmes is sentenced to 11 years and three months in prison for criminal fraud in connection to her role as CEO of Theranos.
  - Attorney General Merrick Garland appoints Jack Smith as special counsel to investigate former President Donald Trump's efforts to overturn the 2020 presidential election, as well as Trump's mishandling of government documents.
- November 19 – A mass shooting at a Colorado Springs LGBT+ nightclub leaves five people dead and 25 injured.
- November 22
  - The Supreme Court unanimously allows Trump's tax returns to be delivered to House investigators.
  - A mass shooting at a Walmart in Chesapeake, Virginia, kills six victims as well as the perpetrator.
- November 28–December 13 – Mauna Loa erupts continuously, its first in 38 years.
- November 29
  - Oath Keepers leader Stewart Rhodes is convicted by a federal jury of committing seditious conspiracy during January 6.
  - 2022 FIFA World Cup: The national men's soccer team defeats Iran by a score of 1–0 and advances to the knockout round. The victory is celebrated across both the United States and by Iranian protestors demonstrating against Ayatollah Khamenei.
  - NYC mayor Eric Adams announces that law enforcement and first responders are now encouraged to involuntarily commit those in mental health crisis.
  - San Francisco approves the deployment of robots capable of using lethal force in policing.
- November 30
  - The House Democratic Caucus elects Hakeem Jeffries to be its leader in the 118th congress; Jeffries will become the first Black lawmaker to lead a party in Congress.
  - Prince William and Princess Catherine of Wales begin a multi-day visit to Boston and are greeted by mayor Michelle Wu.

=== December ===
- December 1
  - FBI search of Mar-a-Lago – In a major defeat for Trump, the 11th Circuit Court of Appeals overturns Judge Aileen Cannon's ruling, thereby halting the special master review of seized material.
  - President Biden hosts French President Emmanuel Macron for a state visit, his first as President of the United States.
- December 2 – The Air Force and Northrop Grumman publicly unveil the B-21 Raider, set to become the first new American stealth bomber in 30 years.
  - Advocate Health was created by the merger of Advocate Aurora Health and Atrium Health becoming the fifth-largest hospital network.
- December 5 – The TSA extends the deadline for Real ID Act compliance by two years. The new date of compliance is in May 2025.
- December 6
  - The Trump Organization through two subsidiaries was convicted by a jury for committing tax fraud and falsifying business records.
  - TSMC announced it will more than triple its investment in Arizona to $40 billion.
- December 7 – An oil leak in the Keystone Pipeline shuts down the pipeline.
- December 8
  - Viktor Bout–Brittney Griner prisoner exchange: WNBA player Brittney Griner returns to the United States as part of a prisoner exchange with Russia, who received arms dealer Viktor Bout back from US custody. Griner had recently been sentenced to nine years in prison for possession of a small amount of cannabis oil.
  - Missouri legalizes marijuana, becoming the 20th US state to do so.
- December 9 – Arizona Senator Kyrsten Sinema switches parties from Democrat to Independent.
- December 11
  - Karen Bass is sworn in by Vice President Harris as the first female mayor of Los Angeles.
  - The US makes an arrest in connection with the 1988 Lockerbie bombing.
- December 12 – Bankruptcy of FTX: The US files criminal charges against Sam Bankman-Fried; he is subsequently arrested in The Bahamas and due to be extradited.
- December 13
  - The Department of Energy announces US scientists have made the first net-gain of energy from a fusion power experiment.
  - President Biden signs the Respect for Marriage Act, which federally protects same-sex and interracial marriages by requiring states to recognize each other's marriage standards.
- December 14 – The Federal Reserve raises interest rates by 0.5 percentage points. The new federal funds rate is at 4.4%.
- December 15 – The Kentucky Supreme Court strikes down a law which permitted tax credits for private school donations, a move seen as a blow to school choice.
- December 16
  - President Biden and Congress agree to fund the government for an additional week to avoid a U.S. government shutdown.
  - The TSA releases data showing that 2022 had a record number of firearm confiscations, at around 6,600.
  - Starbucks unions: Baristas begin a three-day nationwide strike, protesting against the company's efforts to combat labor unions.
- December 19 – The January 6 Committee recommends to the Department of Justice criminal charges, including inciting an insurrection, for former President Donald Trump and other associates.
- December 20
  - A magnitude 6.4 earthquake strikes Ferndale, California, causing substantial damage including gas leaks and power outages.
  - The House Committee on Ways and Means authorizes the public release some of Donald Trump's personal and corporate tax returns. Four years of Trump's returns during his presidency are released to the public on December 30.
- December 21–26 – A major winter storm hits much of the Midwest and northeast. Fifty are killed across the country, and another nine are killed in Canada.
- December 21 – Ukraine–United States relations – In his first foreign trip since the start of Russia's invasion, Ukrainian President Volodymyr Zelenskyy visits Washington, DC to meet with President Biden and speak to Congress to ask for more financial support in the conflict with Russia.
- December 22 – The January 6 Committee releases its full report on the attack on the Capitol.
- December 24 – Beginning this day, Southwest Airlines, due to the winter storm, cancels over 60% of their flights across the next couple days, stranding thousands across the country.
- December 29 - President Biden signs the Electoral Count Reform and Presidential Transition Improvement Act of 2022 into law as part of the Consolidated Appropriations Act, 2023.

=== Other events during COVID-19 endemic phase ===
- April 30 – COVID-19 pandemic: Most Broadway theaters in New York City will drop all vaccine mandates.
- June 8 – COVID-19 pandemic in Florida: Florida reports the first cases of Omicron BA.4 variant at the Premier Medical Laboratory Services in three patients in Miami-Dade County.
- June 9 – COVID-19 pandemic: In Maryland, Governor Larry Hogan outlines a long-term preparedness plan on how the state will deal with COVID-19 including a focus on treatments that would keep people out of hospitals how the state would respond to future variants including Deltacron and Omicron variants.
- June 18 – The CDC unanimously approves COVID-19 vaccines for children under five, including infants and toddlers.
- July 1 – Broadway will lifted all mask mandates up in New York City.
- July 19 – The CDC's independent advisory panel unanimously recommends the use of the Novavax-developed COVID-19 vaccine. CDC director Rochelle Walensky later endorses the new vaccine.
- August 11 – The CDC loosens its guidelines for COVID-19, commenting that coronavirus is no longer in a state where it "severely disrupts our daily lives".
- September 2 – The Biden administration pauses the distribution of COVID tests due to a lack of funding.
- September 18 – COVID-19 pandemic in the United States: Biden administration declared that COVID-19 pandemic is over in the U.S.

== See also ==
- 2022 in American music
- 2022 in American soccer
- 2022 in American television
- 2022 in American radio
- List of American films of 2022
- List of mass shootings in the United States in 2022
