= Utah Valley University =

Public university in Orem, Utah, US

- Seal of the University
- Former names: Central Utah Vocational School (1941–1963); Utah Trade Technical Institute (1963–1967); Utah Technical College at Provo (1967–1987); Utah Valley Community College (1987–1993); Utah Valley State College (1993–2008)
- Motto: "A Place For You"
- Type: Public university
- Established: 1941; 85 years ago
- Parent institution: Utah System of Higher Education
- Accreditation: NWCCU
- Endowment: $129.7 million (2025)
- President: Jon Anderson
- Students: 48,670 (fall 2025)
- Undergraduates: 47,519 (fall 2025)
- Postgraduates: 1,151 (fall 2025)
- Location: Orem, Utah, United States; 40°16′40″N 111°42′50″W
- Campus: Suburban
- Colors: Green and White
- Nickname: Wolverines
- Sporting affiliations: NCAA Division I – Big West
- Mascot: Willy the Wolverine
- Website: www.uvu.edu

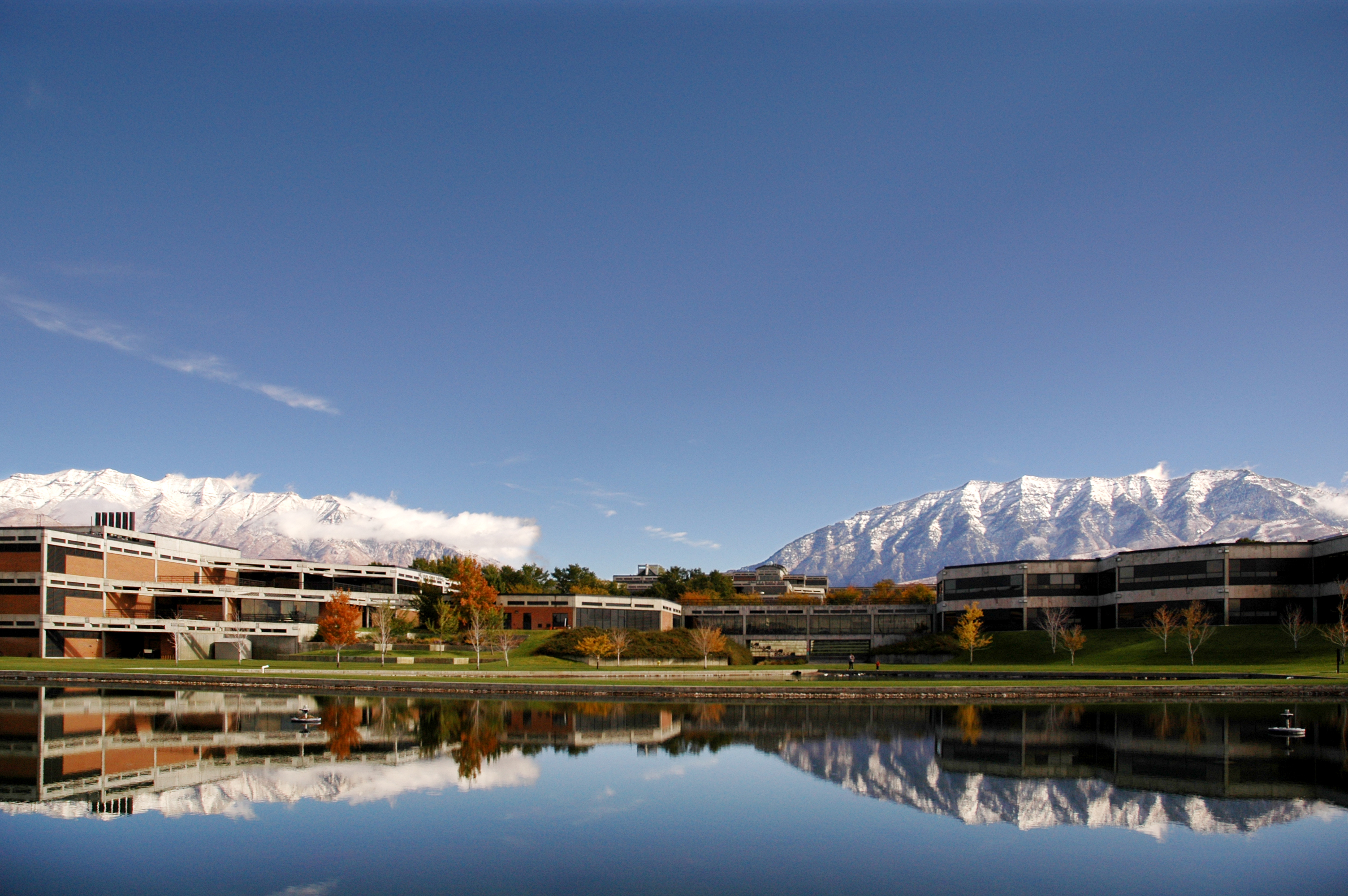
View of the UVU Campus, October 2004

Utah Valley University (UVU) is a public university in Orem, Utah, United States. UVU offers master's, bachelor's, associate degrees, and certificates. Previously called Utah Valley State College, the school attained university status in July 2008. With an enrollment of over 48,000 students as of fall 2025, UVU is the largest university by enrollment in Utah and one of the largest in the Rocky Mountain region of the United States.

== History ==
The school was founded in the fall of 1941, when the Utah State Vocational Office consolidated federal work program classes into one campus in Provo, just west of the campus of Brigham Young University. At this time, the school was known as Central Utah Vocational School. Growth brought numerous changes to the school over the following decades, and it was renamed several times to reflect its changing role. In 1963, the name was changed to Utah Trade Technical Institute.

In 1967, the school became Utah Technical College in Provo and was given the authority to confer associate degrees for the first time. In 1977, the institution began moving to its present location, at the junction of I-15 and University Parkway in Orem. In 1987, it became Utah Valley Community College. When it was a community college, the school had 8,000 students enrolled, and it was growing by approximately 3,000 students a year. In 1993, the school was named Utah Valley State College and began awarding four-year degrees. The Utah legislature approved elevating UVSC to a university in February 2007 (effective July 1, 2008), allowing it to begin offering master's degrees, although the school continues to emphasize its two- and four-year degree programs.

On July 1, 2008, UVSC changed to UVU, officially changing to a university. UVU is the largest employer in Orem, with over 1,900 full-time faculty and staff and over 3,300 part-time faculty and staff. As of fall 2018, the Utah System of Higher Education (USHE) reported UVU as the largest university in the state for the fourth year in a row with 39,931 students, surpassing the University of Utah.

Jon Anderson is the institution's eighth president. Anderson was selected by the Utah State Board of Regents in 2026 and was preceded by Astrid Tuminez.

=== Assassination of Charlie Kirk ===
On September 10, 2025, Charlie Kirk, an American right-wing activist and co-founder of Turning Point USA, was fatally shot on campus during an event for the American Comeback Tour, a debate series he was hosting for his organization. According to the Associated Press, the shot came from the Losee Student Success Center, approximately 350 feet (110 m) from where Kirk was speaking; Kirk was struck in the neck. Kirk was immediately rushed to Timpanogos Regional Hospital and was pronounced dead later that afternoon. In the aftermath, Utah Valley University closed its campus, including their satellite locations, until September 15, 2025.

== Campuses ==
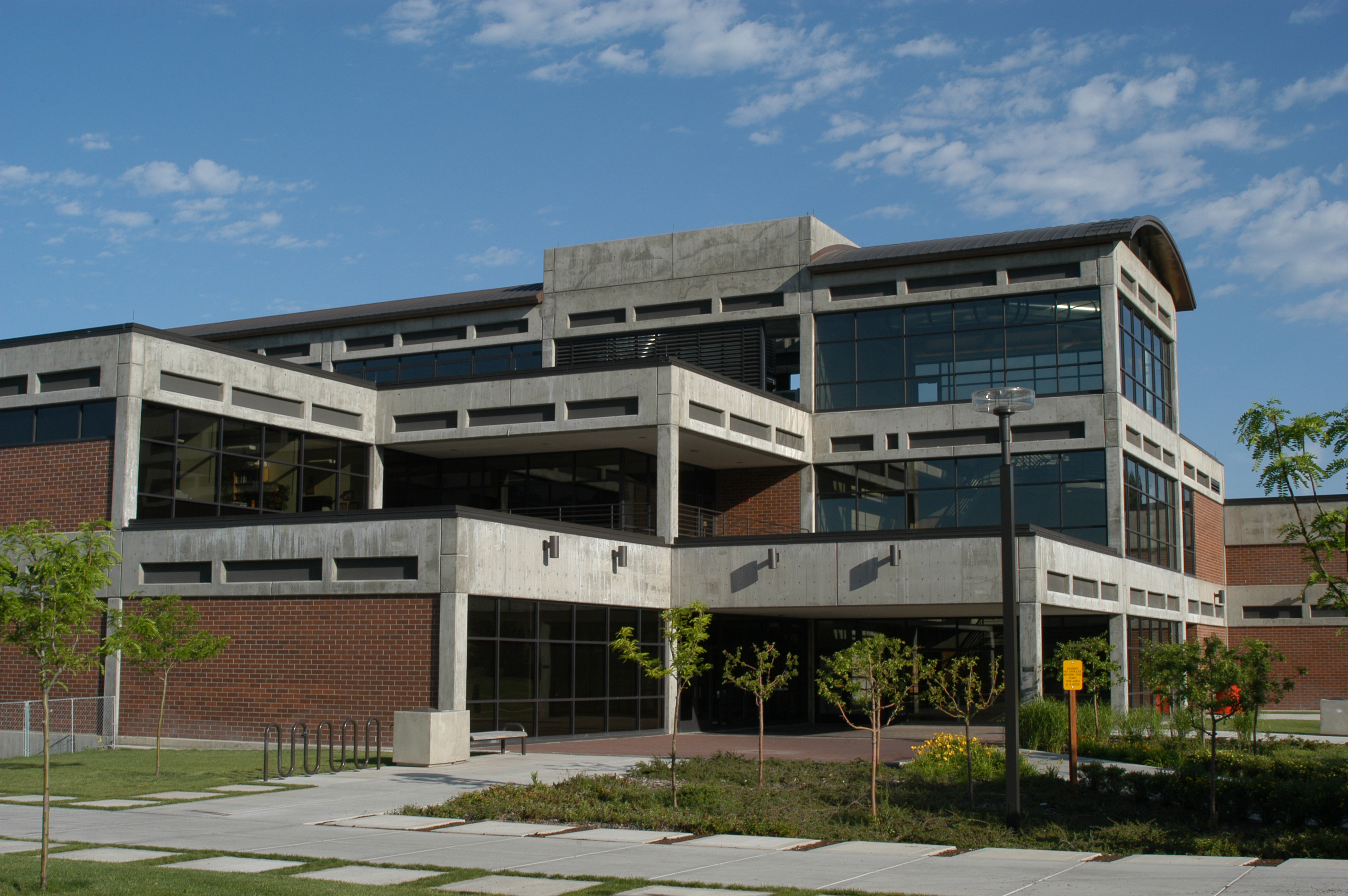
Computer Science Building

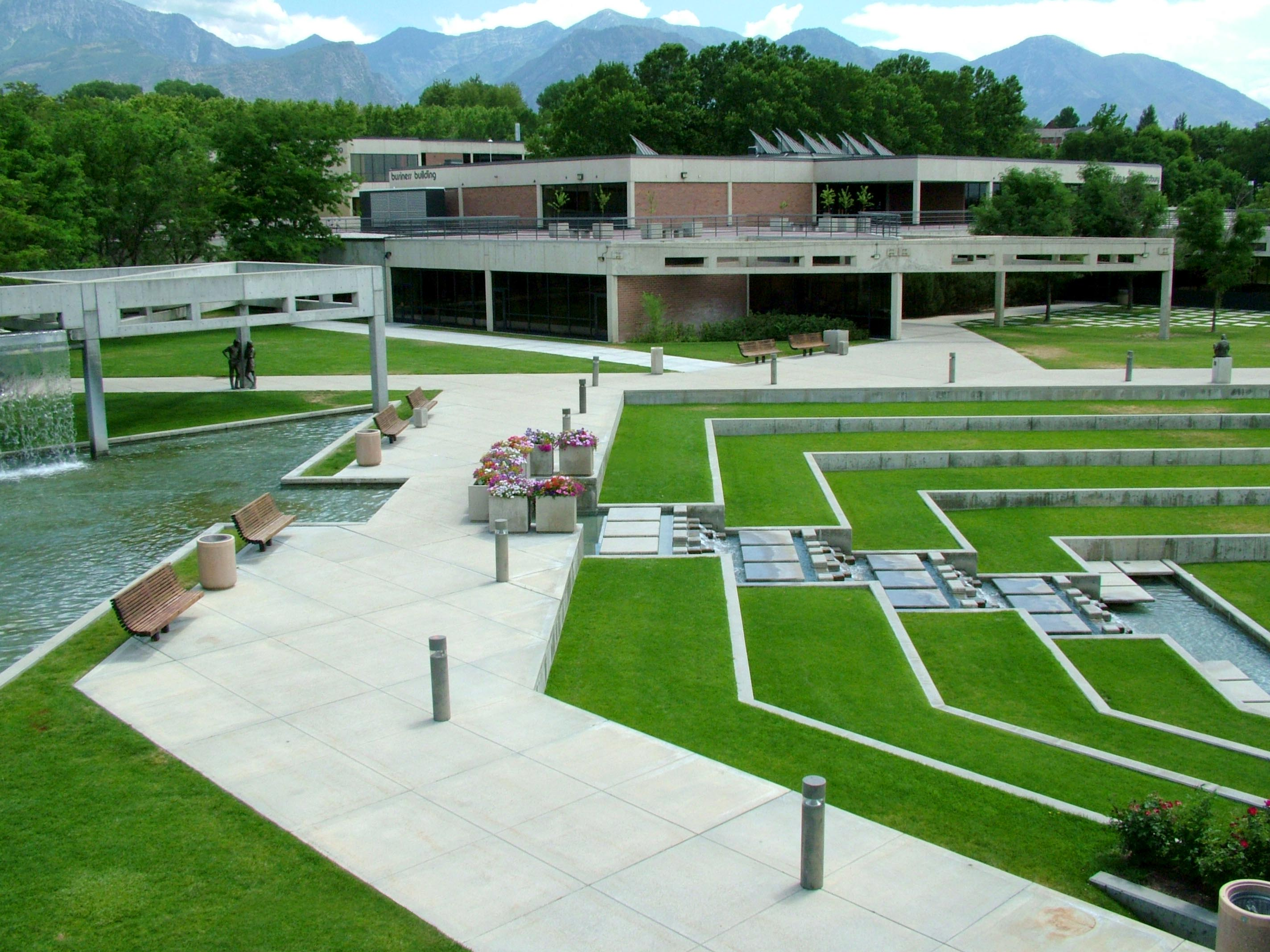
Woodbury Building

UVU's main campus is in Orem with satellite campuses in Heber City (Wasatch), Vineyard, north Orem (Canyon Park), Provo Municipal Airport, Lehi, and the Capital Reef Field Station. UVU's main campus encompasses 228 acres (0.92 km^{2}) and includes 48 buildings.

Each building has been built using the same style of exposed reinforced concrete with masonry infill walls (before 2005), with all of the major buildings on campus connected by 30-foot-wide (9.1 m) concourses. UVU grounds include two reflecting ponds on the west side of campus, a stream running through the east part of campus, and a multi-dimensional fountain in the middle of campus.

UVU is home to the Utah Community Credit Union Center, formerly the David O. McKay Events Center which was built in 1996 with a capacity to seat 8,500 people. The events center is governed by a board of representatives from UVU, Utah County, and Orem City. It not only holds campus activities and sporting events but also community events such as major concerts, trade shows and expos, high school sports tournaments, family shows, graduations, and banquets. It is also home to UVU's culinary arts program, including Restaurant Forte. On average, the Events Center hosts 150–170 events per year. As many as 360,000 people patronize the Events Center on an annual basis.

=== Digital Learning Center ===
In September 2006, the school began construction of a new Digital Learning Center (DLC) to replace the 35,000-square-foot (3,300 m^{2}) Losee Resource Center (library). The DLC is 180,000 square feet (17,000 m^{2}) and is northeast of the Liberal Arts building. It opened on July 1, 2008. The $48 million project includes networked computers, computer labs, a computer reference area (Information Commons), a media center, 31 study rooms, and wireless internet throughout the building. In 2016, money was donated to the library by Ira A. Fulton and Mary Lou Fulton and it was renamed Fulton Library. The library won two 2008 awards from Intermountain Construction magazine for its energy efficiency.

=== Science building ===
The UVU Science Building opened in the summer of 2012. The building features study rooms to the west side that have glass whiteboards as well as windows spanning the entire height of the towers. The new Anatomy Lab has vents to decrease the concentration of Phenol in the air.

=== Young Living Alumni Center ===
The Young Living Alumni Center opened in the fall of 2023. The construction was funded in part by Young Living, a multi-level marketing company based out of Utah, which donated $4.5 million toward its completion. The two-story building has a large event space on the main floor used for fundraising events, conferences, alumni reunions, and meetings. With 25 offices and multiple conference rooms, most of the building's non-event spaces are used by university fundraising and alumni relations staffers. The alumni building is situated on the north end of UVU's Orem Campus, along with the Melisa Nellesen Center for Autism and the McKay Education building.

== Organization ==
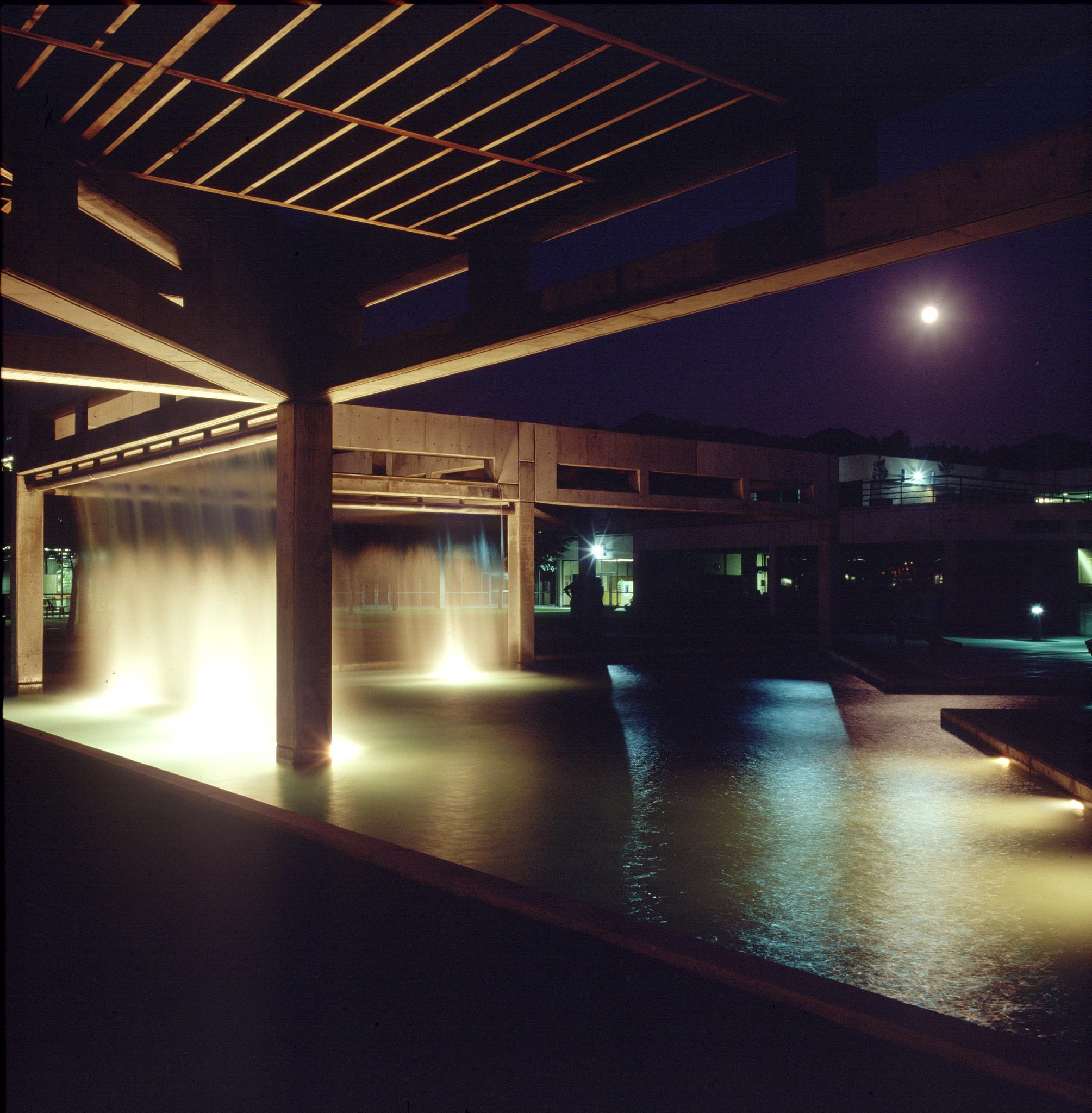
Campus at night

UVU is part of the USHE, with the following primary colleges and schools:

- College of Humanities and Social Sciences
- College of Science
- Smith College of Engineering and Technology
- College of Health and Public Service
- School of the Arts
- School of Education
- Woodbury School of Business

Other academic support programs include the Office of Engaged Learning, the Office of Teaching and Learning, Extended Studies, Summer, Concurrent Enrollment, Professional and Continuing Education, Academic Service-Learning, and Honors.

== Academics ==
Historical Fall Headcount
| Year | HC | ±% p.a. |
|---|---|---|
| 1945 | 566 | — |
| 1963 | 4,267 | +11.88% |
| 1967 | 4,692 | +2.40% |
| 1987 | 6,968 | +2.00% |
| 1993 | 10,512 | +7.09% |
| 2008 | 26,696 | +6.41% |
| 2013 | 30,564 | +2.74% |
| 2018 | 39,931 | +5.49% |
| 2023 | 44,653 | +2.26% |
| 2025 | 48,670 | +4.40% |
Pre-UVU: years of name changes; UVU: every 5 years plus latest Source: see references above

UVU is accredited by the Northwest Commission on Colleges and Universities. Individual programs, schools and colleges, and departments are accredited, certified, or recognized by 19 specialized accreditation agencies. Vocational accreditation was granted in 1976 and renewed in 1990 and 1995 by the Utah State Office of Vocational Education. In December 2006, the UVU School of Business received initial accreditation from the AACSB, which was maintained in 2011.

About 88% of UVU students come from Utah but an increasing number of students come from other states and countries. In 2016, UVU students represented all 50 US states, the District of Columbia, and 74 countries.

As of 2021, UVU held a US ranking of #369 according to Forbes. For 2022, U.S. News & World Report ranked UVU #94-#122 in "Regional Universities West" and #114 in Social Mobility for that region's universities.

=== Utah Fire and Rescue Academy ===
The school is one of the few Utah universities that provides free training to Utah fire agencies. In August 2009, the university unveiled a Mobile Command Center, acquired by federal grants. The Utah Valley University Fire Academy Mobile Command Training Center cost an estimated $200,000 to $300,000 and provides both students and firefighters with realistic fire training.

== Student life ==
Undergraduate demographics as of Fall 2023
| Race and ethnicity | Total |
|---|---|
| White | 77% |
| Hispanic | 13% |
| Two or more races | 4% |
| Asian | 1% |
| Black | 1% |
| International student | 1% |
| Native Hawaiian/Pacific Islander | 1% |
| Unknown | 1% |
Economic diversity
| Low-income (Note: The percentage of students who received an income-based federal Pell grant intended for low-income students.) | 37% |
| Affluent (Note: The percentage of students who are a part of the American middle class at the bare minimum.) | 63% |

=== Performing arts ===
UVU is home to one of the largest public collegiate ballroom dance programs in the United States. The company has over 130 members divided into four teams; one touring team, one reserve, and two backup teams. The backup teams provide the students with the training and performance skills necessary to meet the demands of the touring team. The UVU Ballroom Dance Company has received numerous awards, honors, and accolades as they have performed and competed throughout the United States and abroad, including winning the first ever College Dance Championship on ABC's TV series Dancing With The Stars in 2010.

UVU has ten main musical groups. The four choir groups are Chamber Choir, Deep Green, Emerald Singers, and Concert Choir. The two orchestra groups are Symphony Orchestra and Chamber Orchestra. Band-related groups include Wind Symphony, Jazz Band, Pep Band, University Band, and Percussion Ensemble.

The UVU Theatre program produces five shows each year on its mainstage season. In addition, the president of the university selects a title each year as part of the freshman reading program that the department stages in the university's courtyard. The department partners with the Sundance Resort to produce Sundance Summer Theatre each year. The university creates a play that travels and performs in the Edinburgh Fringe Festival as part of its annual Theatre Semester Abroad to London and Scotland. They also host the Rocky Mountain Summer Stock Theatre Auditions each year, where college students from across the region audition for professional summer stock theatres. UVU is the first university in the nation to win back to back national awards from the Kennedy Center American College Theater Festival. In 2013, they won Outstanding Production of a Play for Vincent in Brixton written by Nicholas Wright and directed by Christopher Clark. In 2014, UVU won Outstanding Production of a Musical for the Pulitzer Prize winning Next to Normal with book and lyrics by Brian Yorkey, music by Tom Kitt, directed by David Tinney, and music direction by Rob Moffat. Other national KCACTF awards UVU repeated include Outstanding Director and Outstanding Performance by an Actress.

=== Media ===
The school has an independent, student-run weekly newspaper called the UVU Review. The newspaper began publishing under the name on June 30, 2009, the day before the university transition became official.

The school is also the subject of the documentary This Divided State.

== Athletics ==
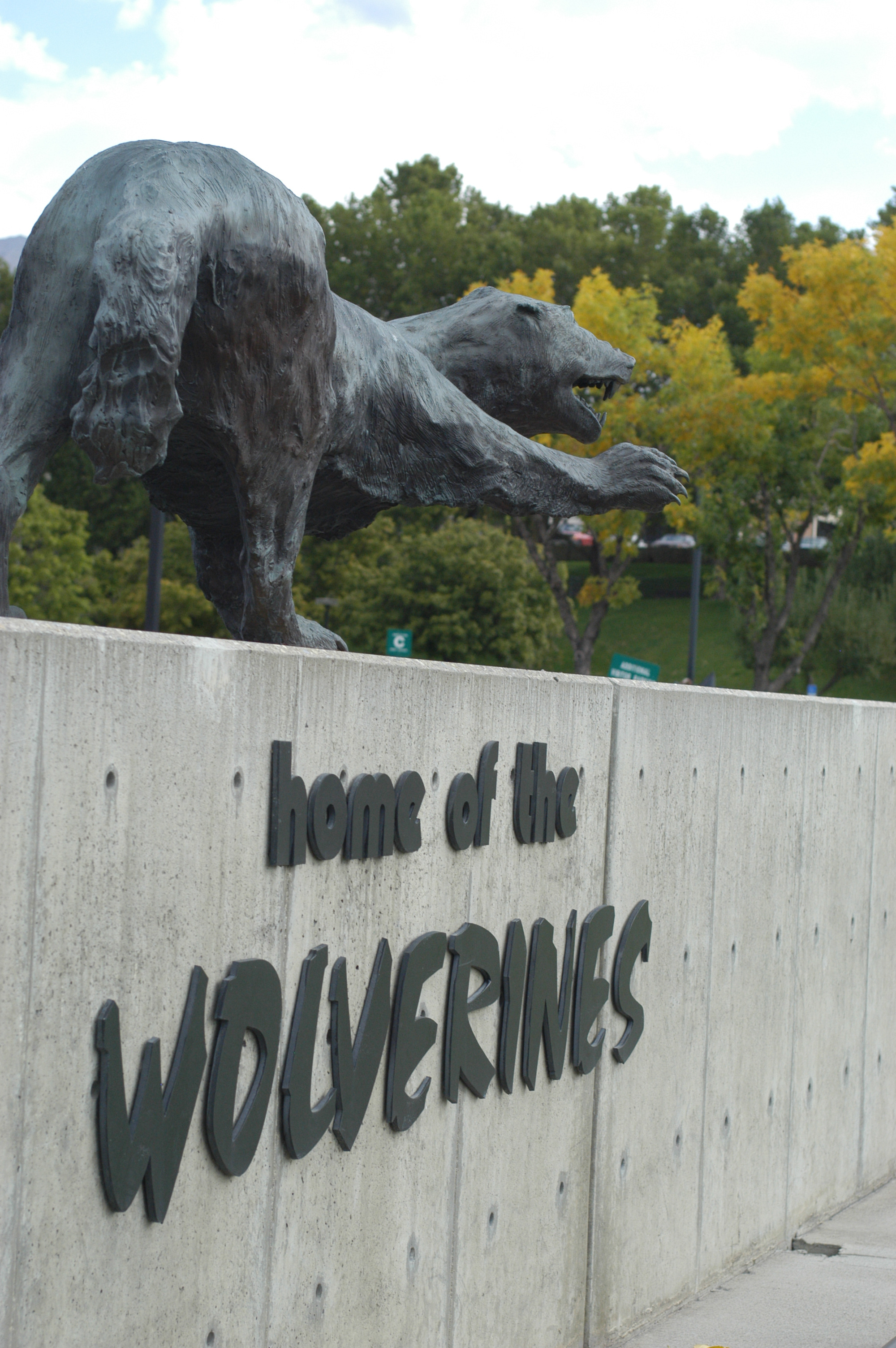
The school mascot is the Wolverine.

The school mascot is the Wolverine, and the colors are green and white. The Wolverines compete in the Big West Conference for all sports except wrestling in which they compete in the Big 12 Conference.

The UVU student section was changed to "The Den" in the beginning of the 2017–18 school year. It was previously called Mighty Athletic Wolverine League, or "MAWL".

The Wolverines play their home basketball games in the 8,500-seat UCCU Center. The baseball team plays at UCCU Ballpark, a 5,000-seat facility that was also formerly home of the Orem Owlz, a minor-league affiliate of Los Angeles Angels of Anaheim, that competed in the Pioneer Baseball League. Track and Field compete at the Hal Wing Track & Field. Softball at the Wolverine Field. And, Volleyball and Wrestling competed in Lockhart Arena.

== Notable alumni ==
- Reyna I. Aburto – former second counselor to Jean B. Bingham in the General Relief Society Presidency of the Church of Jesus Christ of Latter-day Saints
- Savannah Berry – marathon runner
- Jared Bridegan – Microsoft senior design manager and homicide victim
- Daniel Elliott – Indiana State Treasurer (2023–present)
- Christopher Fogt – Olympic silver medalist in four-man Bobsleigh
- Akwasi Frimpong – Ghana skeleton athlete, 2018 Olympian
- Brandon Fugal – businessman and owner of Skinwalker Ranch
- Matt Gay – professional football player (two seasons at UVU before transfer to University of Utah)
- Andreas Gustafsson (born 1981) – Swedish race walker
- Gregg Hale – former guitarist for the band Spiritualized
- Andrew Hales – YouTuber (did not graduate)
- Travis Hansen – professional basketball player (transferred to Brigham Young University)
- Chelsie Hightower – a professional dancer on TV series Dancing with the Stars and So You Think You Can Dance
- Jef Holm – winner of The Bachelorette Season 8
- Thayne Jasperson – Broadway actor, singer, and choreographer, most notable for Hamilton (musical)
- Mitch Jones – professional baseball player
- Ricky Lundell – 3rd-degree black belt in Gracie Brazilian Jiu-Jitsu, high school wrestling coach
- Michael McDonald – professional basketball player
- Kam Mickolio – professional baseball player
- Trevor Milton – founder, former chairman and CEO, Nikola Corporation
- Ramsey Nijem – wrestler; professional mixed martial artist, The Ultimate Fighter 13 finalist, Lightweight fighter for the UFC
- Noelle Pikus Pace – World Cup gold medalist and Olympic silver medalist in Skeleton
- Matthew S. Petersen – Chairman of the Federal Election Commission, and former Republican chief counsel to the United States Senate Committee on Rules and Administration
- Ronnie Price – professional basketball player
- James Rallison (TheOdd1sOut) – YouTuber, dropped out
- Wesley Silcox – world champion bull rider
- Matangi Tonga – professional football player

== See also ==
- Roots of Knowledge, a stained glass display in the Fulton Library on campus
