= Reverse Freedom Rides =

Segregationist plan to send African-Americans out of Southern US

Reverse Freedom Rides were attempts in 1962 by segregationists in the Southern United States to send African Americans from southern cities to mostly northern, and some western, cities by bus. They were given free one-way bus tickets and were promised guaranteed high-paying jobs and free housing in an attempt to lure African Americans. In reality, there was no guaranteed free housing or jobs waiting for them. Though some of those arriving were able to find work, most could not.

== History ==
=== Organization ===
The Reverse Freedom Rides were a parody of the Freedom Rides which were organized by the Congress of Racial Equality (CORE) and the Nashville Student Movement in 1961. The reverse rides were organized by George Singelmann, member of the New Orleans Greater Citizens' Council, in retaliation against Northern liberals.

Singelmann viewed the reverse rides as a way of testing the north and proving white northerners were not sincere in their desire for racial equality. In a TV interview Singelmann stated, "They have been crying the sing song on behalf of the Negroes throughout the nation. And of course now when it comes time for them to put up or shut up, they have shut up." Singelmann also viewed the rides as an opportunity to steal some of the press coverage which was continuing to be devoted to the Freedom Rides and as a means to remove some African Americans from the state's welfare roll as he believed they were draining state resources.

At the start of their operation, Singelmann and the Citizens' Council planned to send thousands of African American families to the North. They attempted to secure $100,000 from the Louisiana legislature to fund the plan, but they failed and had to rely on individual and group donors.

The first Reverse Freedom Riders arrived in New York on April 20, 1962. By spring of 1963, the Southern segregationist scheme had been exposed, and the Citizens' Council ran out of funds to continue their operation. By the end of their operation, they had not met their goal but still managed to lure approximately 200–300 African Americans into participating in the reverse rides.

The most common destinations were New York City, Chicago, Philadelphia, and Los Angeles.

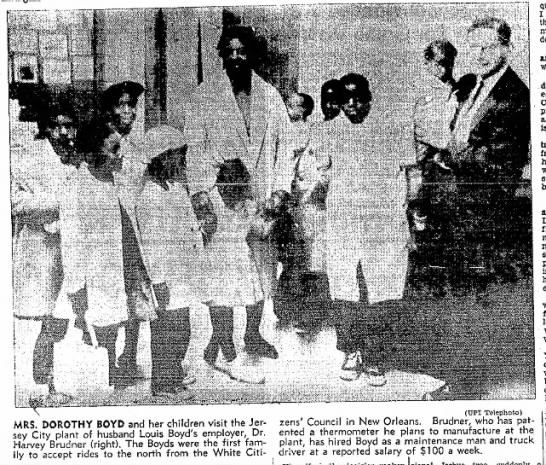
Image of the Boyd Family printed in the Simpson Leader-Times

The first Reverse Freedom Riders were the Boyd family who were sent from New Orleans to New York City. Lewis and Dorothy Boyd arrived at the Port Authority Bus Terminal in New York City after a 43 hour ride with their eight children. There was no job waiting for them, but the media was. With each ride sent, the Citizens' Council would tip off the press to ensure media coverage. The Boyds were chosen as the first family as they knew the media would be particularly attracted to them, and Singelmann viewed them as high priority to remove from the state, since they already had eight children, were expecting one more, and Lewis Boyd had been unemployed for three years.

In May 1962, the Citizens' Council of America issued a collective resolution supporting Singelmann's Reverse Freedom Rides in response to continued northern press coverage criticizing race relations in the South. The resolution said, "in order to effect an equitable and amicable solution to said racial chaos, friction and sectional division, the Citizens' Council of America hereby urge the various local and state organizations in the South to take necessary and judicious action to expedite volunteer migration of any dissatisfied Negroes from the South." This led to a coordinated multi-state effort by triggering efforts by councils in many other Southern states including Louisiana, Georgia, and Alabama. When efforts began in Louisiana, their council's spokesperson announced, "We want to see if northern politicians really love the Negro or whether they love his vote." Historians suggest this statement ignited Southern attempts at collaborating to remove rural African Americans from the South.

The Mississippi House of Representatives announced support for the council's resolution and coordinated removal in a resolution of their own, emphasizing the need to "redistribute dissatisfied Negro population to other areas where the political leadership constantly clamors for equal rights for all persons without regard to the constitution, judicial precedent and rights of the states."

=== Responses ===
There was adamant support for the Reverse Freedom Rides among many prominent figures in the South; however, once the scope of the council's plan was revealed, much of the other attention to the rides was negative. James Farmer, organizer of the original Freedom Rides, referred to the methods of the White Citizens' Councils as "a device to gain cheap publicity at the expense of personal suffering and deprivation." Civil rights activists like Martin Luther King Jr and Roy Wilkins expressed similar criticisms.

Some politicians also denounced the plan publicly. Otto Kenner Jr, governor of Illinois compared the plan to Hitler and the Nazis' deportation of Jewish people. Kenneth Keating, New York senator, denounced the Citizens' Council's actions as "cruel and callous". The Reverse Freedom Rides did gain the attention of President Kennedy; however, his response was rather neutral to avoid losing Southern supporters. He said the Reverse Freedom Rides were "deplorable" while clarifying that "there is no violation of law." Kennedy also called it "A rather cheap exercise." Many newspapers also published opinions on the Reverse Freedom Rides. Notably, The New York Times referred to them as "A cheap trafficking in human misery on the part of Southern racists."

Singelmann and members of the Citizens' Council were pleased to see many of the public responses did support his goal of the plan, proving northerners were neither willing nor able to support African Americans. John Volpe, governor of Massachusetts, feared the state being overwhelmed by "impoverished Blacks" and asked for federal legislation prohibiting the rides. Following Singlemann's announcement of the departure of two busses full of African Americans towards Washington DC, The Washington Post published an article saying:

"Some of these unfortunate families may come to be sorry they left New Orleans... They are coming to city which by reason of its very size is not always able to deal well with human problems. They are arriving in a community the welfare agencies of which Congress has rendered notoriously inadequate to cope with the problems of poverty… They will be received, nonetheless, with good will, as surely a similar influx would be received by most of the people of New Orleans."

William M. Rainach, the first president of the Citizens' Councils of America, responded to such remarks and inspired continued mobilization of Citizens' Councils throughout the South by saying, "For the first time, we are on the offensive. We have exposed the hypocrisy of the people of the North."

By Southern politicians, newspapers, and activists, the Reverse Freedom Rides were sometimes met with support and praise. For example, Allen J. Ellender, Louisiana senator, also supported the council saying, "I want Negroes from the South to learn they are better taken care of in the South."

Some Southern newspapers, such as the Louisiana press, remained relatively neutral and limited coverage of the rides. Others were rather pragmatic in their reports on the rides. Surprisingly, the segregationist newspaper Birmingham Post-Herald admitted the rides "may be good for a few laughs down here, but it will neither help our cause nor make us friends where we need them most."

== Legacy ==
In mid-2022, Texas governor Greg Abbott and Florida governor Ron DeSantis, both Republicans, took actions to provide transport for migrant asylum applicants crossing into the United States, sending them to Washington, D.C., New York City, and other locations calling themselves sanctuary cities that take liberal views of enforcing immigration policies. Both Abbott and DeSantis had spoken out against current immigration policies and sanctuary cities. Both governors' actions, notably the Martha's Vineyard migrant airlift, were criticized as officials in the receiving states found that the migrants claimed to have been deceived about what offers they were given; DeSantis' spokesperson has denied this allegation.

These actions have been compared to the Reverse Freedom Rides by, among others, CNN, Democracy Now!, The Guardian, The Hill, and NPR.

== Sources ==
- McMillen, Neil R. (1994). The Citizens' Council: Organized Resistance to the Second Reconstruction, 1954–64. University of Illinois Press. ISBN 978-0-252-06441-8. OCLC 30437420.
