= Killing of Seth Smith =

2020 killing in Berkeley, California, United States

- Smith in 2019
- Location: Berkeley, California
- Date: June 15, 2020
- Attack type: Shooting
- Victim: Seth Smith
- Perpetrator: Tony Lorenzo Walker
- Verdict: Pleaded no contest to voluntary manslaughter
- Convictions: 25 years in prison

Seth Thomas Smith (2000–2020) was a 19-year-old University of California, Berkeley student who was fatally shot in the back of the head at point-blank range near his off-campus apartment in Berkeley, California, on June 15, 2020. Berkeley police arrested local resident Tony Lorenzo Walker, then 60, on August 20, 2020, and the Alameda County district attorney first charged him with murder. Walker later pleaded no contest to voluntary manslaughter and, on May 23, 2022, received a 25-year state-prison sentence.

== Background ==
Smith grew up in Elk Grove, California, and graduated from Cosumnes Oaks High School. He acted in Cosumnes Oaks High productions and his theater teacher recalled him fondly as a skilled performer, intelligent and compassionate. The drama department held a candle-light vigil for him on July 3, 2020, the eve of what would have been his 20th birthday. At UC Berkeley, he double-majored in economics and history, and planned to pursue graduate study at the London School of Economics.

Walker was a long-time Berkeley resident with a criminal record spanning five decades and at least eleven prior felony convictions, from assaults with semiautomatic weapons (1982) to illegal gun possession (2016). Throughout his criminal history, plea deals served to dismiss many charges and cases. He was on felony probation at the time of Smith's death.

== Shooting ==
At about 10:00 p.m. on June 15, 2020, Smith left his apartment for a routine evening walk. Around 11:15 p.m., a passer-by walking a dog found him lying on Dwight Way near Acton Street with a single gunshot wound to the back of his head. He was transported to Highland Hospital, where he died shortly afterward. Police recovered a spent .40-caliber cartridge casing and the bullet at the scene. There were no eyewitnesses. Nothing was taken from Smith, and detectives soon ruled out robbery as a motive.

== Investigation and arrest ==
On June 18, 2020, three days after the shooting, the City of Berkeley offered a $50,000 reward for information. That same day an anonymous caller directed detectives to Walker, who lived on the same block.

During a four-day preliminary hearing in November 2020, prosecutors laid out the investigative timeline. Acquaintance "Roger Ellis" testified that on June 13, he drove Walker to a Vallejo gun shop and bought .40-caliber ammunition for him because Walker, a felon, could not do so himself. Ellis said Walker later admitted he had killed someone. Investigators recovered from Ellis's cellphone a photograph of a .40-caliber Glock 22, which he had taken to ensure he'd get the proper ammunition. A probation search of Walker's apartment turned up a letter to his neighbor with instructions on how to fund inmate accounts and firearm cleaning utensils in a kitchen drawer.

Detective Andrés Bejarano testified that, in a follow-up interview, Walker complained: "A white kid gets killed and the damn whole world stops. Fuck that white motherfucker," even though officers had not mentioned a "white kid". Digital forensics showed 15 YouTube videos on gun handling and cleaning viewed just before and after the homicide, plus frequent web searches for "breaking news" in Berkeley beginning the day after the shooting. A text on June 16, from Walker sent to Ellis, read, "Still waitin' on da news. I wanna see it." In later days, his search history demonstrated he had found websites announcing the $50,000 reward and coverage of the specific case. The murder weapon itself was never recovered, and Walker later urged Ellis to delete their text trail and to claim the ammunition had been stolen.

Berkeley police arrested Walker, suspecting him of murder, at his Dwight Way apartment on August 20, 2020. He was booked into Alameda County Jail and held without bail.

== Legal proceedings ==
The Alameda County district attorney charged Walker on August 24, 2020, with first-degree murder and firearm enhancements. He pleaded not guilty. In pre-trial hearings, the defense argued the evidence was circumstantial, noting the absence of eyewitnesses or DNA. Prosecutors cited Ellis's testimony, ammunition receipts, and Walker's texts.

On May 23, 2022, Walker entered a no-contest plea to voluntary manslaughter as part of a negotiated disposition; other counts were dismissed. Superior Court Judge Paul Delucchi sentenced him to 25 years in state prison. Under California’s truth-in-sentencing rules, he must serve at least 85 percent (about 21 years) before parole eligibility.

== Aftermath ==
UC Berkeley chancellor Carol Christ called the shooting "a senseless tragedy that affects all of us as a campus," offering condolences to Smith's family, classmates and teachers.

At sentencing, Walker apologized to Smith's mother, saying he was "so sorry" and had "no reason" for the shooting. Walker offered few details, simply stating he went outside to clear his head, adding "and, before you know it, I shot Seth." Michelle Smith said the plea deal denied the family a public trial and deeper understanding of her son's death.

Friends and relatives created the "Seth Thomas Smith Memorial Scholarship" through the Elk Grove Community Foundation to honor his memory, and by 2023 two students had already received awards through the fund.
