= California FAST Recovery Act =

2022 California labor law

FAST Recovery Act

California State Legislature
- Long title: Fast Food Accountability and Standards Recovery Act
- Enacted by: California State Legislature
- Signed: September 5, 2022
- Introduced by: Chris Holden, Wendy Carrillo, Evan Low, Luz Rivas
- Status: Not yet in force

The Fast Food Accountability and Standards (FAST) Recovery Act (AB 257) is a Californian law which brings multiple reforms to the state's fast food industry. The bill's provisions aim to allow workers and California state to hold fast-food chains responsible for issues like wage theft and overtime pay, and establish a council which itself shall be responsible for establishing minimum standards for fast food workers. The regulations will apply to any chain in California that has at least 100 stores nationwide that share a common brand. The bill has since been passed by both the Assembly and State Senate, and was signed by Governor Gavin Newsom on September 5, 2022.

The bill has received widespread support from labor unions and worker advocacy organizations, with Mary Kay Henry, the president of the Service Employees International Union (SEIU), arguing that the bill addresses "challenges that workers have faced when trying to change policies by unionizing store by store". The legislation was the subject of fierce opposition from the fast food industry and various chambers of commerce (including the national chamber) which states that the bill would catalyst inflation and further raise menu prices. A report from UC Riverside School of Business stated that the act could increase labor costs by 30% to 50% (thereby causing fast-food prices to rise by up to 30%), encourage customers to eat elsewhere (like full-service restaurants and grocery stores), and result in the closure of 1-2,000 fast-food locations statewide, with 30,000 to 45,000 resulting job losses.

The law has been put on hold until the November 2024 election, after opponents gathered more than 1 million signatures with 712,000 of those deemed valid, surpassing the 623,000 needed to generate a referendum on the law.

== Provisions ==
The act would create a state-run 10-member council to set wage and labor standards across the fast-food industry that would be composed of two state officials, along with representatives from unions, workers, and employers. The council is allowed to raise minimum wages for fast food workers, though not beyond $22/hour. Separately, the act requires annual cost of living increases for this new wage floor.

Multiple provisions and reforms are found in the bill. One provision also allows a franchisee to sue a restaurant chain if the franchise contract contains strict terms that leave them no choice but to violate labor law. Those terms could be related to store hours or the employment status of workers. A previous rendition of the bill held liable not only franchisees but also franchisors in the event of a working condition or wage theft violation, though this provision was ultimately removed from the bill.

The council is specifically prohibited from requiring paid-time-off or sick-leave, or making rules relating to worker scheduling.

== Reception ==
Former Assembly member Lorena Gonzalez, the original author of the bill in a previous session of the Assembly, commented that the bill was intended to "give workers a voice on the job", recognizing the "tough" situation that service industry workers are in. Among the supporters of the FAST Recovery Act included labor unions and workers in general, which a UCLA and UC Berkeley study finds over 67% of whom encountered a wage theft violation, a further 25% of which received retaliation for their complaint.

Opponents of AB 257 primarily consists of restaurant owners, franchisees, franchisors, and chambers of commerce. Matt Haller, the president of International Franchise Association, argued that franchisees are either going to go out of business by absorbing costs or push costs onto consumers. A Panera Bread franchise president commented to Fox Business that if he could not pass costs onto consumers sustainably, he would close his restaurants.

== Estimated effects ==
A report from UC Riverside School of Business stated that the act could increase labor costs by 30% to 50% (thereby causing fast-food prices to rise by up to 30%), encourage customers to eat elsewhere (like full-service restaurants and grocery stores), and result in the closure of 1-2,000 fast-food locations statewide, with 30,000 to 45,000 resulting job losses.

== Legislative history ==
The bill passed both legislative chambers, passing the California State Assembly by 47-19 with 14 members not voting, and the California State Senate by 21-12 with 7 state senators abstaining. The Senate removed a "joint liability provision" which would have held parent companies responsible for actions of their franchisees. Governor Gavin Newsom signed the legislation into law on September 5, 2022.

On December 30, 2022, however, the Sacramento Superior Court ruled that the legislation must be placed on a ballot measure if it qualifies. A coalition to oppose the legislation, Save Local Restaurants, successfully argued both that referendum effort is well underway and rendering the law unenforceable; Newsom's office attempted to begin enforcement of AB 257 on January 1, 2023, though this was also halted by the Sacramento Superior Court. The court ultimately ruled that because there was "very little harm" to the public from the law not being enforced now, if the measure gained enough signatures to appear in the 2024 California elections in November, it would become a proposition.

On January 25, 2023, the law was put on hold until the November 2024 election, after opponents gathered more than 1 million signatures by December 4, 2022, and the Secretary of State deemed 712,000 of those valid, surpassing the 623,000 needed to generate a referendum on the law.

On September 11, 2023, the Save Local Restaurants campaign, which gathered the signatures for the referendum, announced a deal with the Legislature, in which the FAST Recovery Act would be repealed by a limited bill, Assembly Bill 1228. AB 1228 was passed along party lines in both chambers, 32-8 in the Senate and 53-17 in the Assembly, and was signed into the law by Newsom September 23, 2023. AB 1228 raised the minimum wage to $20 for fast food workers and established a statewide Fast Food Council.
