= Martha's Vineyard migrant airlift =

2022 US political event

On September 14, 2022, Florida governor Ron DeSantis sent some 50 primarily Venezuelan asylum seekers by air from San Antonio, Texas, to the island of Martha's Vineyard in Massachusetts. President Joe Biden and other Democrats called it "a political stunt and inhumane", while Republicans such as Mitch McConnell called it "a good idea".

== Background ==
Since April 2022, as a protest against President Joe Biden's actions and policies on US illegal immigration, Texas governor Greg Abbott and Arizona governor Doug Ducey have sent buses of refuge seekers to northern United States cities with a large presence of Democratic Party supporters. According to DeSantis, the flights he arranged were to expose "liberal hypocrisy", because people in Democratic northern cities "were so proud to be sanctuary jurisdictions", and when migrants arrived "they all of a sudden go berserk". DeSantis's office said the flights would "transport illegal immigrants to sanctuary destinations" that can care for migrants "they have invited into our country by incentivizing illegal immigration through their designation as 'sanctuary states' and support for the Biden Administration's open border policies."

DeSantis asked the legislature for relocation money, saying the federal government made more than 70 flights of immigrants to Florida in 2021. He budgeted $8 million and got $12 million from the Florida legislature in 2022, paid from interest on the $5.8 billion that Florida received from the American Rescue Plan. The fund was earmarked, to "facilitate the transport of unauthorized aliens from this state [Florida] consistent with federal law". According to the Associated Press, these migrants are legally permitted to remain in the United States while they pursue asylum.

== Migrants' situation ==
At some point of the ordeal, the asylum seekers were given fake pamphlets (in both English and Spanish) titled "Massachusetts Refugee Benefits", detailing a list of benefits they would supposedly receive if they boarded the flights to Massachusetts. The exact origin of the pamphlet is unclear. At the front was a flag (above) incorrectly depicted as that of Massachusetts.

Some migrants were told, by a San Antonio woman named Perla Huerta, that their flights were going to Boston, Massachusetts, where they could get what NPR described as "expedited work papers". A Boston Globe and Texas Tribune investigation found that a tall, blond woman approached migrants outside a San Antonio McDonald's. One migrant contacted by the papers said she promised "three months of rent, work, and said they were going to put our papers in order." She gave them meals and four nights in a San Antonio hotel before their flights left, and offered one migrant $200 to recruit others to board the flights. Some migrants turned down the offer.

One of the two flights that Florida governor DeSantis chartered departed from San Antonio stopped in Florida, stopped again in South Carolina, and landed on Martha's Vineyard. The second flight similarly left San Antonio, stopped in Florida, stopped again in Charlotte, North Carolina, and finally landed on Martha's Vineyard. DeSantis hired Vertol Systems for the flights, who then subcontracted Ultimate JetCharters, based in Ohio. Additional Ultimate JetCharters flights scheduled to fly migrants from Texas to Delaware were canceled.

Initially, the migrants stayed at a St. Andrew's Episcopal Church shelter on Martha's Vineyard. The woman who runs the shelter told NPR, "Everything from beds to food to clothing to toothbrushes, toothpaste, blankets, sheets. I mean, we had some of it ... but we did not have the numbers that we needed." High-school Spanish students assisted as translators. Some migrants said they were promised jobs on Martha's Vineyard; when they arrived, peak employment season was over, and part-time residents were leaving. Massachusetts governor Charlie Baker then activated the National Guard, which voluntarily relocated the foreigners by ferry to Joint Base Cape Cod where support services existed.

== Aftermath ==
=== Texas sheriff investigation ===
Bexar County Sheriff Javier Salazar, a Democrat, launched an investigation into the incident; Salazar alleged that a Venezuelan migrant was paid to recruit 50 migrants from a resource center in San Antonio, the county seat of Bexar County, to travel to Florida and eventually Martha's Vineyard. Governor DeSantis responded to the allegations, saying the migrants were not misled: "They all signed consent forms to go and then the vendor that is doing this for Florida provided them with a packet that had a map of Martha's Vineyard, it has the number for different services that are on Martha's Vineyard."

On October 13, 2022 Salazar signed certifications that the immigrants were victims of a crime, which qualified them for U visas.

=== Class action suit ===
On September 20, 2022, the 50 migrants filed a class action lawsuit against DeSantis and Florida's secretary of transportation in a Massachusetts federal trial court, arguing that the Florida governor and his administration "manipulated [the migrants], stripped them of their dignity, deprived them of their liberty, bodily autonomy, due process and equal protection under the law, and impermissibly interfered with the Federal Government’s exclusive control over immigration in furtherance of an unlawful goal and a personal political agenda". The suit ultimately seeks to have the judge declare DeSantis's actions unconstitutional and prohibit Florida from fraudulently transporting migrants across state lines.

DeSantis's spokesperson responded by saying the migrants had all signed a consent form, and called the lawsuit "political theater" by "opportunistic activists" at the expense of illegal immigrants. He added: "If these activists spent even a fraction of this time and effort at the border, perhaps some accountability would be brought to the Biden Administration's reckless border policies that entice illegal immigrants to make dangerous and often lethal journeys through Central America and put their lives in the hands of cartels and Coyotes."

The allegations were initially dismissed in April 2024 on the ground that only the company for the airlift was liable. The lawsuit against Florida was revamped in July 2024. DeSantis spokesperson rejected the allegations again in September 2024.

=== Reactions ===
Democrats objected to the airlift, and Biden called it "a political stunt and inhumane". Many Republicans supported the move, including Mitch McConnell, who "thought it was a good idea".

Journalists writing in outlets including The New York Times and The Washington Post discussed connections between the airlift and the Reverse Freedom Rides of 1962, in which White segregationists misled Black Southerners and bused them to northern cities and towns, including one near Martha's Vineyard.
