= Elizabeth L. Gleicher =

American lawyer and judge (born 1954)

- Born: 1954; Detroit, Michigan
- Education: Carleton College (B.A. 1976); Wayne State University (J.D. 1979)
- Occupation: Jurist

Elizabeth L. Gleicher (born 1954) is an American lawyer and jurist. She became a judge on the Michigan Court of Appeals, 2nd district in 2007.

== Life and career ==
Gleicher was born in Detroit, Michigan. Her father, Morris Gleicher (1917–1992), was a former president of the Michigan ACLU. She received her bachelor's degree in history from Carleton College in 1976 and her Juris Doctor degree from Wayne State University law school in 1979.

She began her legal career at Goodman, Eden, Millender & Bedrosian in Detroit, a firm known for "defending those considered indefensible, not because of what they did, but because of who they were, reflecting the prejudices of their times." Gleicher was one of the six associates and partners in Ernest Goodman's firm who went on to receive the "Champion Of Justice Award" from the State Bar of Michigan during the course of their careers. Gleicher opened her own law practice in 1994. She was elected a Fellow of the International Society of Barristers in 2004 and in 2007 was appointed to the Michigan Court of Appeals. On September 7, 2022, Gleicher ruled that the 1931 state law that criminalized most abortion in Michigan was unconstitutional, as it violated rights of bodily integrity and equal protection in the Michigan Constitution. Her husband, Mark Granzotto, is an appellate lawyer. The couple have three sons.
