= Killing of Jared Bridegan =

2022 homicide in Jacksonville Beach, Florida

- Jared Bridegan, when he was a senior design manager at Microsoft.
- Location: 30.2580°N 81.4000°W; Jacksonville Drive—Sanctuary Boulevard, Jacksonville Beach, Florida, United States
- Date: February 16, 2022; Approximately 7:45 p.m. (EDT)
- Attack type: Homicide, shooting
- Accused: 1
- Charges: Mario Fernandez Saldana and Suspect: First-degree murder; Conspiracy to commit murder; Solicitation to commit a capital felony; Child abuse; Henry Tenon: Second-degree murder
- Verdict: Henry Tenon: Pleaded guilty; Mario Fernandez Saldana: Convicted
- Sentence: Henry Tenon: 15 years in prison
- Convicted: Henry Tenon; Mario Fernandez Saldana

The killing of Jared Bridegan occurred on February 16, 2022, in Jacksonville Beach, Florida. Jared Bridegan, a 33-year-old Microsoft senior design manager, was shot and killed after he dropped off his older twins at his ex-wife's house.

In January 2023, Henry Tenon was arrested for Bridegan's murder. In March 2023, a second suspect, Mario Fernandez Saldana, was arrested in Orange County, Florida. The grand jury indicted the suspect with charges of first-degree murder, conspiracy to commit murder, solicitation to commit a capital felony, and child abuse. In August 2023, a third suspect, Shanna Gardner, ex-wife of the victim and wife of the second suspect, was arrested and indicted on the same charges.

Tenon accepted a plea deal, and was sentenced to 15 years in prison. The other two suspects pleaded not guilty. The trial was originally scheduled for late 2025, before being pushed to November 2026.

== Jared Bridegan ==
Jared Galen Bridegan was born on June 29, 1988, in Warrensburg, Missouri, to Gaylord and JoAnn Bridegan. He was raised in Jacksonville, Florida, and attended Douglas Anderson School of the Arts. In 2014, he graduated from Utah Valley University, with a B.S. degree in Digital Media. He worked in various technology and design roles, including at Clean Simple Eats, Web.com, and Microsoft.

In April 2010, Bridegan married his first wife, Shanna Gardner, in Salt Lake City, Utah. Bridegan and his first wife had two children together. In 2015, they divorced. Bridegan married his second wife, Kirsten, a woman from Charlotte, North Carolina, with whom he had two children. At that time, Bridegan was a 33-year-old man and lived in St. Augustine, Florida.

== Killing ==
On February 16, 2022, Bridegan drove from St. Augustine to Jacksonville Beach to drop off his 9-year-old twin children at his ex-wife's home, with his 2-year-old daughter in the backseat of his Volkswagen Atlas. Bridegan was driving home when he stopped between Jacksonville Drive and Sanctuary Boulevard because a tire was in the middle of the road. When he got out of the car to move the tire, he was shot and killed. Some bullets passed through the car, inches away from Bridegan's daughter.

Around 8 p.m., Jacksonville Beach police officers responded to reports of shots fired in the area. The police found Bridegan's body with multiple gunshot wounds, next to his car.

== Investigation ==
The State Attorney's Office and the Jacksonville Beach Police Department were certain that the killing was premeditated and even rehearsed.

The details from the investigation of Bridegan's killing were not made public, but it was mentioned that Bridegan was involved in a custody battle with his ex-wife. His ex-wife was living in West Richland, Washington, with her children after the killing. According to the police, a blue Ford F-150 was seen on a security video at the time of the murder.

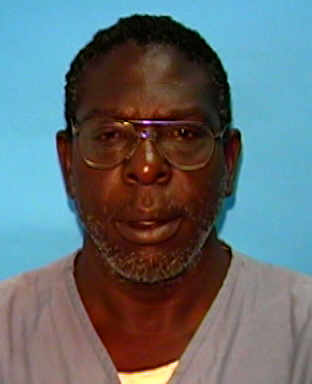
Henry Artur Tenon

Henry Tenon, a then 61-year-old man, was considered a person of interest because he drove a blue Ford F-150 and was a former tenant at one of the suspect's homes. Tenon's cellphone records indicated he was in Jacksonville Beach the night of the killing. Tenon also had a criminal history. Tenon said a friend borrowed the truck that night. Tenon requested an attorney after police questioned him. On October 14, police found three checks totaling $10,000 in Tenon's bank accounts. There were checks for $2,000 and $3,000 that were cashed on March 28 and a check for $5,000 that was cashed on April 4. All of the checks were signed by one of the suspects.

== Arrests ==
In January 2023, Tenon was arrested and charged with conspiracy to commit murder, second-degree murder with a weapon and accessory after the fact to a capital felony. After the arrest warrant, phone records revealed that Tenon and one of the suspects had 35 calls in February, 30 calls in March, and additional calls between May and June. Tenon accepted a plea deal, pleading guilty to second-degree murder, with the other charges dropped and agreed to testify in the trial. Tenon confessed and accepted that he was the triggerman. He was sentenced to 15 years in prison.

In March 2023, Mario Fernandez Saldana, the husband of the victim's ex-wife, Shanna Gardner-Fernandez, was arrested in Orange County, Florida. A grand jury indicted him on charges of first-degree murder, conspiracy to commit murder, solicitation to commit a capital felony, and child abuse. In August 2023, Bridegan's ex-wife, Shanna Gardner-Fernandez, was indicted by the grand jury on the same charges. Both pleaded not guilty. Originally, the prosecutors were seeking the death penalty against the suspects, before they agreed to take the death penalty off the table in November 2025, with the support of Bridegan's widow and family. On August 26, 2026, Mario Fernandez Saldana was convicted of first degree murder as well as solicitation of murder.

== Legacy ==
After Jared's murder, his widow Kirsten Bridegan started the Bridegan Foundation in his honor. The foundation has created the "Bexley Box" to donate to police departments and sheriff's offices, first in Florida and then around the country. These boxes contain basic necessities and comfort items for children, such as toys, sippy cups, diapers in assorted sizes, and blankets. Their goal is to "make children's experiences at police stations a little less traumatic and scary".

== See also ==
- Crime in Florida
