= Des Moines, Iowa chapter of the Black Panther Party =

Chapter of Black Panther Party

The Des Moines, Iowa chapter of the Black Panther Party (BPP) was founded in 1968 and remained active until 1970. After spending time with political organizers in California, Mary Rhem (who later changed her name to Sister Haadasha) returned home to Des Moines to formally establish a local branch of the Black Panther Party, making Des Moines' chapter one of few to be launched by a woman. The chapter implemented several survival programs intended to uplift and provide for the Black community in Des Moines, such as their Free Breakfast Program for schoolchildren and a Drug/Alcohol Program to combat addiction.

After splitting from the national party in 1970 due to ideological differences, the Des Moines chapter would eventually dissolve and split into different groups that continued to serve the Black community of Des Moines.

== National Black Panther Party ==
Established in 1966, the Black Panther Party for Self-Defense was a Black Power revolutionary group founded in Oakland, California, by Huey P. Newton and Bobby Seale. The organization was originally created as a self-defense program for African Americans against police brutality, and eventually evolved to adopt Marxist-Leninist ideologies and practices. Reaching around two thousand members at its peak toward the end of the 1960's, the Panthers established chapters across the United States and officially recognized thirteen chapters (although historian Miriam Eve White has testified to the existence of more than twenty). Their time in power was haunted by the FBI's Counterintelligence Program (COINTELPRO) that intended to sabotage the Panthers as well as other Black Power and New Left groups. This did not stop the party from instituting lasting ideas and programs during their brief reign, though, including countless survival programs across the nation to provide free food, health care, education, and other services.

== Background of racial tensions in Des Moines ==
Racial tensions had been rising in the decades leading up to the establishment of Des Moines' chapter of the Black Panther Party as a result of discrimination in "housing, education, and employment," as well as racial segregation of public spaces. As a result, the city's Black community of the Jim Crow era was feeling a "mounting anger" and beginning to fight back against the racial oppression that was prominent in Des Moines' history.

=== Katz Drug Store ===
Historians Bruce Fehn and Robert Jefferson cite the first major post-World War II protest against racial discrimination in Des Moines as being a sit-in at Katz Drug Store in 1948. The store had long refused to serve African Americans at its soda fountain or cafeteria, and the Des Moines branch of the National Association for the Advancement of Colored People (NAACP) had been fighting to take the drug store to court for almost two decades. On July 7, 1948, activists led by Edna Griffin and John Bibbs went to the drug store and ordered ice cream at Katz's soda fountain. As was expected, they were denied service by the waitress and manager, but Griffin used this instance to incite protest and legal action against Katz. Eventually, the case reached the Iowa Supreme Court, where in State v. Katz (1949), it was held that Katz's refusal to serve African Americans was a civil rights violation, and the drug store began serving all patrons regardless of race on December 2, 1949.

=== Other civil rights work ===
Throughout the 1950s and 1960s, African Americans in Des Moines fought for civil rights on several fronts. Legal action was prevalent throughout Des Moines, with attorneys fighting housing and employment discrimination as well as excessive police force. Black lawyers Charles P. Howard Sr. and Robert Wright Sr. fought such cases for the African American community, as well as "nearly 100 social and civil clubs," as identified by historian Lynda C. Walker-Webster, that served Des Moines' Black community. One of the most involved civil rights groups was the Des Moines Human Rights Commission, which was petitioned for by several diverse civil rights groups in Des Moines and was officially established as an addition to the mayor's office in 1954.

=== 1966 Good Park rebellion ===
Racial tensions reached a peak in Des Moines on July 4, 1966 with the rebellion at Good Park. The park, as described by Fehn and Jefferson, was a "place where black children and teenagers went to play, socialize, and recreate" during this era and was located in a growing Black neighborhood in Des Moines. For several nights leading up to July 4, local police had confrontations with young African Americans refusing to leave the park's pool at closing time. The day of the rebellion, the police were called to the park after fireworks were set off that were outlawed in Iowa. Upon the arrival of the police, those who had collected in the park were "accosted physically and verbally," and consequently began to jump on and rock the cars of the police. Police were also pelted with rocks and bottles as they attempted to do away with the barricade that had been put up by those in the park at the entrance. Police chief Wendell Nichols reached out to John Estes, Perry Hooks, and James B. Morris, three local well known Black community members in an attempt to settle the nerves of all present. The three were successful on the night of the 4th, but when unrest persisted into the next day and Estes and Morris were called back, Morris was hit in the ribs by a brick. The ensuing police searches throughout the neighborhood resulted in the arrest of seven individuals in their late teens.

== Foundation of the Des Moines chapter ==
In 1967, not long after graduating from high school, Mary Rhem left home in Des Moines, Iowa, to visit family in California. While there, she spent time learning from political organizers, some of whom were in the Black Panther Party, and Rhem took particular inspiration from Bunchy Carter. Inspired by her time in California, Rhem returned home and began her efforts of political organizing, at which point she met Charles Knox, who had previous organizing experience with Volunteers in Service to America (VISTA) in Chicago, Illinois, and Kansas City, Missouri. The two worked together to officially establish a Des Moines chapter for the Black Panther Party, and with Rhem being accredited as the official founder in February 1968, she was one of few women to instigate the formation of a Black Panther Party branch in an otherwise male-dominated organization.

== Leaders and members ==
At its peak, the Des Moines chapter reached around 100 members. The police and FBI struggled to sneak their way into the party because of how small and tight-knit the community was, despite the chapter's comparatively large corps. A majority of the chapter's members were younger than twenty years old and were either recent high school dropouts or graduates. Rhem herself, the founder of the chapter, was a recent high school graduate and Knox, serving as Deputy of Education, had received a college education. Other higher-ups of the chapter were Deputy Minister of Defense, Charles Edward Smith; Deputy Minister of Finance, Beverly Williams; and Lieutenant for Distribution, Stephen Green (now Ako Abdul-Samad).

== Programs and community work ==
=== Drug/alcohol and free breakfast programs ===
In alignment with chapters across the nation, the Des Moines chapter founded several programs during its active years. The chapter demanded sobriety of its members and established a Drug/Alcohol Program. The chapter would also drive those struggling with addiction to a center in Kansas City, Missouri, since there was no treatment center in Des Moines at the time. A staple of the party nationwide, the Des Moines chapter also instituted a Free Breakfast Program that regularly fed around one hundred students (although recently, former chapter member and current Iowa State Representative, Ako Abdul-Samad, attested that they would feed "almost 300 children in the mornings") in elementary school and junior high every Monday, Wednesday, and Friday. Panther leaders that ran the Breakfast Programs would also teach the children present about socialism, capitalism, and imperialism using simplified analogies. The program reached across racial lines, taking in children from several communities and receiving help from different churches of different racial predominance. In fact, the main church they operated out of, Forest Avenue Baptist Church, consisted of a predominantly white congregation. Several locals, such as grocery store owner Leo Pidgeon, who saw the importance of the program would donate food and money that allowed for it to persist.

=== Education ===
The Des Moines chapter, while following the national party's Ten Point Program, tailored their practices to cater to the needs of the Black community of Des Moines more specifically. They placed heavy emphasis on Point Five in particular, that demanded "education for our people that exposes the true nature of this decadent American society." As Knox described, many new members of the chapter had recently dropped out of high school and "couldn't read. They couldn't distinguish letters. The political classes taught them to read." To address this, each new member in the Des Moines chapter had a mandated six weeks of "political education." The Panthers wanted to combat illiteracy across the Black community in Des Moines, however, so these political education classes were open for public attendance as well. These weekly gatherings, attended largely by African Americans and a few white people, would address the social inequities in the United States, specifically concerning education and health care. The meetings would also air films, such as Huey P. Newton's Off the Pig that likened policing of African American communities to the United States' involvement in Vietnam.

Education was of such importance, in fact, that the Des Moines chapter formed its own sixteen-point program to uplift standards for public schools in Des Moines, particularly for African Americans. It was presented to the school board in collaboration with the Black Committee for Student Power that the chapter had organized. Among their demands were the teaching of African American history by Black teachers, the termination of discriminatory school class formation called "academic tracking," and that racist teachers be fired.

=== Collaboration with other chapters ===
The Des Moines chapter worked in close cooperation with the nearby chapters of Kansas City, Missouri, and Omaha, Nebraska. So much so, indeed, that the three chapters would often exchange members between themselves to better develop the party's objectives. Charles Knox described the relationship between the three chapters here in the context of the Drug/Alcohol program: "What happened out of that was a series of lectures on alcoholism grows out of this... need to talk about treating people who did have the problem and launched us into, say, Des Moines bringing people, taking people, to Kansas City to get treatment for drugs, for drug addiction-right- because Des Moines did not have a center. Or Kansas City when the person can't go there, go into Des Moines if Des Moines had something or Omaha. So you see we moved into those areas because of necessity." By the 1970s, the three chapters would all break away from the national party as a bloc.

=== Demonstrations ===
==== Good Park, 1969 ====
On April 13, 1969, a gathering was organized by the chapter's leaders to provide more publicity for the Free Breakfast Program at Good Park, a hub of the largest Black community in the city that was "cherished... as a social and recreational space more or less isolated from the racism and discrimination" that was exhibited throughout the rest of Des Moines. The same site where the unrest referred to as the Good Park Rebellions in early July 1966 took place saw an initially successful rally, before around twelve police officers arrived to make arrests for "unlawful assembly and resisting arrest." One officer present testified that Knox had "turned his attention to the officers and advised the crowd to 'rise up and strike out' and to turn on the Des Moines pigs." As police tried to arrest Knox, fellow Panther Charles Edward Smith attempted to pry Knox from the grip of the police while others began throwing bricks and stones at police cars and other cars that happened to be passing by. University and Forest Avenues, two nearby roads, were closed off by the end of the day and police were lathered across the entire area. As a result of the altercation, one woman suffered gunshot wounds and was hospitalized, and countless arrests were made as people were leaving the scene, including leaders of the chapter Rhem, Knox, and Abdul-Samad (Stephen Green at the time). One man even testified that his sons, Clive (who would join the chapter while in jail) and Hobart DePatten Jr., were arrested and when their mother asked the police what was going on, she was arrested as well.

In the following days, Black and white college students across the state gathered at the University of Iowa as well as the Des Moines capitol building hosting demonstrations and rallies. Party members were also beginning to receive invites to speak at Iowa universities to spread the message of the Black Panther Party.

== Headquarter bombing and attempted assassinations ==
On the night of April 26, 1969, the Panthers' headquarters at Twelfth Street and University Avenue was bombed in an attempted assassination of the chapter's leadership. This came as a final attack in a string of bombings that had targeted predominantly Black communities in Des Moines throughout the month of April. The damage from the blast demolished the back half of the building and destroyed windows in around fifty nearby homes of the predominantly African-American neighborhood. Nobody was killed nor injured from the blast, however members of the party Edward King and Johnson Hughes were pepper sprayed by police as they attempted to leave the home, which led to a scuffle and the two Panthers being arrested. The only reported injuries were that of three police officers, as the arrests of King and Hughes had angered nearby witnesses, leading to police cars being targeted by Molotov cocktails and rocks. Tensions arose as a result of the bombing, and Ako Abdul-Samad reflected on the movement to begin to carrying around guns afterwards, which was a new development for the Des Moines chapter.

While some suspected the Minutemen, a local equivalent to the Ku Klux Klan, many believed that the Des Moines police were to blame for the bombing. There were several reports that the police had arrived at the Panthers' headquarters within thirty seconds of the explosion, which was a surprise as chapter member Charles Smith testified, "I've never seen them get anywhere that fast in my life." This, combined with the types of plastics found from the bomb residue, led many within the Panthers to believe the police were to blame. Some city officials and the Des Moines police charged that the Panthers themselves had bombed the headquarters. Weeks after the explosion, a Des Moines police officer reported that three Panther members had testified at a gathering in Minneapolis, Minnesota, that in search of national attention, they had set off the explosive. Chapter member Archie Simmons was charged for the explosion along with purportedly bombing a police station with Mary Rhem, David Colton, and Mike Smith, who became known as the Des Moines Four, thanks to the Panthers' national newspaper.

Despite a brief attempt to reorganize and salvage the headquarters, a couple of months later the chapter decided to relocate to an office building nearby at 1210 University Avenue.

== Separation from the national party and dissolution ==
In the autumn of 1970, the Des Moines chapter and the national party split for a number of reasons, but largely because of disagreements in practice and theory. One major controversy was the nationally mandated reading of Soul on Ice, a book written by Eldridge Cleaver, one of the leading figures of the Black Panther Party. Cleaver admits to serial rape in the most controversial part of the book, and Knox describes the sentiment of the Des Moines chapter on the subject: "we took a position that this guy talking about raping a black woman to practice on, to deal with a white woman, I mean we thought he was a nut then." The Des Moines chapter promptly banned the book, furthering the divide between them and the national party which had been ignited by the assassination of Fred Hampton, leader of the Illinois chapter. Hampton had served as a mediator of sorts for the chapters in the Midwest, and his murder by the Chicago police in cooperation with the FBI's COINTELPRO operation had begun to create a fissure between the national party and the chapters in the heartland. The Des Moines chapter also expressed their frustration with the national party's priority on newspaper sales as it became increasingly dependent on its revenue. While the party had sold paper across the state of Iowa, it was not as large of a priority in their eyes, and eventually a national representative was ordered to come to address the issue. Ideological differences also drove a rift between the national party and the chapter in Des Moines, Knox saying they believed "they were misguided, that they were not putting theory into practice," and other chapter member Clive DePatten thought the disagreement was over how local chapters represented themselves: either as leftists engaging in Marxism-Leninism-Maoism theory or as members of local communities dedicated to creating better lives for their Black residents.

Immediately following the split, Knox continued to work with a group they named the Black Revolutionary Communist Youth that convened both in Knox's apartment and the former Panthers' headquarters. The Black Revolutionary Communist Youth continued to sustain the Free Breakfast Program that now worked out of the United Methodist Church. Rhem and other members of the Des Moines chapter Charles Smith and Peter Williams lived in the same building as Knox. The police's raiding of their building prompted Rhem to begin distributing a pamphlet that stated the following: "Again the fascist authorities of Des Moines unjustifiably harassed the Black Revolutionary Communist Youth by ransacking our apartment while we were not at home (the brothers and sister were serving the people by assisting with the free breakfast program)."

Historian Reynaldo Anderson also writes of Knox and others continuing to work under the name of the Black Revolutionary Party (BRP), formed in early 1971. They continued to work throughout the Midwest and expanded to international politics as well, once travelling to Quebec to "support the Quebecois in their struggle for self-determination" as described by Knox. They also communicated with the governments of China and North Korea to attain literature to spread throughout the community for political education, and received books from both Chairman Mao and Kim Il Sung.

The Black Revolutionary Party began to dissolve in 1972 as differing ideologies began to form. As its constituents began to split three ways, into Marxist-Leninists, Pan-Africanists, and Maoists, Knox was unsuccessful in his attempts to unite the party under a single ideology and the several factions went their separate ways.
