= Charles P. Howard Sr. =

African American journalist and attorney (1894–1969)

- Charles P. Howard Sr., circa 1929
- Born: Charles Preston Howard Sr. May 10, 1894; Abbeville, South Carolina, U.S.
- Died: January 25, 1969 (aged 74); Baltimore, Maryland, US
- Other name: Charley Howard
- Education: Morris Brown College Tuskegee Institute; Fort Des Moines Provisional Army Officer Training School Drake University Law School, LL.B. 1922
- Occupations: Lawyer and journalist
- Employer(s): Iowa Bystander; Iowa Observor; Howard News Syndicate
- Organization: Vice-president of the Progressive Party
- Known for: Co-founder of the National Negro Bar Association and the National Negro Publishers Association

Charles "Charley" Preston Howard Sr. (May 10, 1894 – January 25, 1969) was an African American trial lawyer, journalist, political leader, and civil rights activist. He was a long-time columnist for the Iowa Bystander and was a United Nations correspondent in the 1950s and 1960s, focusing on civil rights and the decolonisation of Africa. He founded the National Negro Publishers Association, the Iowa Observer, and the Howard News Syndicate, which represented 34 newspapers. As a trial attorney, Howard won many notable civil rights cases, including State of Iowa v. Katz. He co-founded the National Negro Bar Association when Black lawyers were denied admission into the American Bar Assocation.

Howard was a delegate to eight Republican National Conventions. However, he became the vice president of the Progressive Party and was the keynote speaker of the 1948 Progressive National Convention. He was a United States delegate to the communist-sponsored World Peace Council and visited the Soviet Union in 1950. He was also involved in the post-World War II peace movement and was a founder of the American Peace Crusade.

J. Edgar Hoover, director of the Federal Bureau of Investigation (FBI), spent 27 years trying to build a case against Howard as a subversive and communist. Some modern historians have speculated that the FBI was behind efforts to disbar and discredit Howard, resulting in his voluntary turning in his license to practice law in 1951. In the 1960s, Howard became involved with Black nationalist movement and was selected to become the Minister of State and Foreign Affairs of the proposed Republic of New Afrika.

== Early life ==
Howard was born on May 10, 1894, in Abbeville, South Carolina. His parents were Mary L. and Augustus Howard. His maternal great-uncle was Henry McNeil Turner, a bishop and missionary of the African Methodist Episcopal Church and one of the first African Americans to serve in the Georgia House of Representatives. He grew up in Atlanta, Georgia. He graduated from EDM High School in 1916.

Howard attended Morris Brown College and the Tuskegee Institute. While at Tuskegee, he joined the Alpha Phi Alpha fraternity. He enrolled in Drake University Law School in 1917, before his studies were interupted by World War I.

Howard graduated as a second lieutenant from the Fort Des Moines Provisional Army Officer Training School in 1917. He served in France with the United States Army 92nd Division's 366th Infantry, as a lieutenant and judge-advocate.

After the war, Howard graduated from Drake University Law School with an LL.B. in 1922. At Drake, he was a star athlete in baseball, football, and track. He was a first baseman in baseball and a left end in football. Howard won the state African American championship in discus and shot put in 1922. He was also Iowa's African American state tennis champion. For a time, Howard was the only college athlete in Iowa to letter in six sports.

== Career ==
=== Law ===
Howard passed the Iowa State Bar on June 3, 1920, two years before he graduated from law school. In 1922, he established a private law practice in Des Moines, Iowa. His office was located at 204 Watrous Building and, later at 515 Mulberry Street.^{[3]} Howard specialized in high-profile criminal defense and civil rights cases.^{[4]}

One of his early cases was defending a Black man who was on death row for the murder of a White schoolteacher.^{[4]} Despite the watchful eyes of the Ku Klux Klan, Howard's client was retried on a lesser charge and received a new sentence of life imprisonment.^{[4]} Howard was the legal counsel for the Polk County Insanity Commission.^{[2]}

When he was denied membership in the American Bar Assocation because of his race, Howard and three other Black lawyers founded the National Negro Bar Association, now the National Bar Association, in 1925.^{[1][5][6]} The National Negro Bar Association created a network of Black lawyers across the United States.^{[5]} Howard served as the chairman of the Iowa Negro Bar Association.^{[2]}

During the Great Depression, Howard left law and worked briefly as the manager of the Illinois district of the National Benefit Life Insurance Company in Chicago. He returned to his law practice in Des Moines in August 1930. In April 1932, Mayor Dwight N. Lewis appointed Howard to the position of Des Moines city prosecutor. Howard had united Black voters to support Lewis in his campaign against former Mayor Parker Crouch, who had demonstrated an "indifference" toward Black voters. Howard was the first Black city prosecutor in Des Moines, raising opposition from the Iowa branch of the Ku Klux Klan.

Starting in 1935, Howard's private law practice suffered when clients complained about ethical misconduct or negligent conduct.^{[2][5]} An Iowa District Court suspended his law license for six months in 1940.^{[2]} After being reinstated, Howard received additional client complaints.^{[2]}

Despite the ethical complaints, Howard had a distinguished career as a trial lawyer and supporter of civil rights cases for Iowan African Americans in the 1940s.^{[1][2][5][7]} In 1947, he represented a light-skinned African American woman who was arrested by the Des Moines police for being a White woman in the company of a Black man.^{[2]} He was the lead attorney for Edna Griffin and other Black Iowans in their discrimination lawsuits against Katz Drug Store in 1948 and 1949.^{[5]} Although his clients did not receive a large payout, the settlement he secured for eight clients in State of Iowa v. Katz ended open discrimination against African Americans in Iowa’s public accommodations.^{[2][4]} (Note: Griffin later criticized Howard's handling of civil liberty cases, possibly because of the low payout in her case. Howard then refused to work with her in various civil rights organizations. He also objected to her election as the co-chair of the Iowa Progressive Party in 1948.) Howard also represented an African American man who claimed the Sioux City police beat him until they secured a confession for raping a White teenage girl, before the Iowa Supreme Court in 1950.^{[2]} Howard represented 78 clients in capital cases; none received the death penalty.^{[8][4][3]}

Three months after Howard attended a 1950 conference in Communist Poland and weeks after he returned from a side trip to the Soviet Union, the Polk County Bar Association filed for Howard's disbarment.^{[4][3][9]} The bar association claimed that Howard demonstrated unprofessional conduct in four cases going back to 1945.^{[4]} Three of the cases involved finances; the fourth involved a claim that Howard became the attorney for the defense after informally discussing the case with the plaintiff's lawyer.^{[4]}

The day before his disbarment hearing, Howard voluntarily surrendered his law license, resigning from the Iowa State Bar Association on February 16, 1951.^{[2][4]} He was unsuccessful in his petitions to the Iowa Supreme Court for readmission to the Iowa Bar in 1952 and 1957.^{[2][5][4]} In 1990 and 1993, Howard's admirers in the National Bar Association were unsuccessful in their request to the Iowa Supreme Court for a posthumous reinstatement.^{[2][4][9][10]}

=== Journalism ===
After World War I, Howard wrote a nationally syndicated newspaper column called "The Observer". Starting in 1922 through the 1930s, Howard was the featured columnist for the Iowa Bystander, a statewide newspaper for African Americans. He was a member of the International Typographical Union.

Howard established the Iowa Observer in 1939 with his three sons; this neighborhood newspaper for African American readers expanded into several weekly newspapers in Iowa, Indiana, and Wisconsin in the 1940s. In 1939, he created and was the editor-in-chief of the Howard News Syndicate, which represented 34 newspapers in the United States, Canada, Asia, and Africa. In 1940, he co-founded the National Negro Publishers Association, now called the National Newspaper Publishers Association.

During World War II, Howard managed the Iowa Observer for his sons. On behalf of the newspaper, he made numerous inquiries about segregation with the Women's Army Corps at Fort Des Moines and interviewed trainees. His coverage of the issue was published in various newspapers. Upon learning about this in October 1942, the director of the Federal Bureau of Investigation (FBI), J. Edgar Hoover, ordered his agents to pursue Howard for seditious changes, as it was a crime punishable by twenty years in prison for publishing or saying anything that could weaken the morale of the military. The FBI agents were unable to build a viable case after spending two years on their investigation. However, Hoover continued to pursue Howard for sixteen years.

From 1951 until his death, Howard worked as a United Nations correspondent, based in New York City. With this position, Howard traveled to Africa, Belgium, Czechoslovakia, Cuba, the Far East, France, the Middle East, Poland, and the Soviet Union. He spent time with President Chiang Kai-shek of the Republic of China, Prime Minister Tetsu Katayama of Japan, Prime Minister John Kotelawala of Ceylon, President Ramon Magsaysay of the Philippines, President Gamal Abdel Nasser of Egypt, Shah Mohammad Reza Pahlavi of Iran, Vice President (later president) Sarvepalli Radhakrishnan of India, and Premier Joseph Stalin of the Soviet Union.

Howard was a member of the United Nations Correspondents Association. His "UN Report" column focused on the decolonization and self-determination movements in Africa and the African countries that were newly independent from the European colonial powers. His articles in Freedomways criticized the European countries and the United States for exploiting the newly formed African nations; he also visited communist Cuba to report on conditions for Afro-Cubans under Fidel Castro. He also published essays about the American civil rights movement. Howard wrote an editorial in 1960 that linked the anti-colonial movement in Africa with the lunch-counter sit-ins in the Southern United States. In 1962, Howard became the United Nations correspondent for Muhammad Speaks, the newspaper of the Black Muslim movement in the United States. The FBI considered Howard's newspaper reporting "hostile to the official United States position in the United Nations in connection with African affairs."

=== Politics and activism ===
On April 16, 1927, Howard wrote in his "The Observer" column in the Iowa Bystander, "I would rather die and go to hell than let my children know by my silence, by my acquiescence, I permitted to grow stronger the sentiment that they were not entitled to absolutely everything that everybody else in this country is entitled to."

Howard was secretary of the National Negro Voters League and chairman of the Colored Voters Division of the Republican Party of Iowa. From Theodore Roosevelt's campaign for president in 1900 to 1935, Howard was a delegate to every Republican National Convention. As a result, he became influential in the Republican Party. In 1928, Herbert Hoover sent Senator Smith W. Brookhart to ask for Howard's help in getting more voters in the strongly Democratic Southern United States. Hoover and Brookhart wanted Howard to ask the African Americans who were Republican national committee members to resign, making it easier to attract white Southern voters. Hamilton declined in "blunt and profane terms". Instead, he called the committee members by long-distance telephone, encouraging them to keep their positions. As an alternate delegate to the 1932 Republican National Convention, Howard began to wonder if it was possible to advance African Americans through the Republican Party.

By 1948, Howard had joined the Progressive Party and served as its vice president. On July 23, 1948, Howard gave the keynote speech of the 1948 Progressive National Convention in Philadelphia, Pennsylvania. That year, the Progressive Party nominated former vice president and Iowan Henry A. Wallace for president and campaigned on an ambitious anti-discrimination platform. According to The New York Times, Howard's speech championed the Soviet Union's efforts to establish peace, and "castigated the Republican and Democratic parties for many words but few deeds to uphold equal rights for all citizens and abolish the 'Jim Crow, white supremacy' tradition of the South". His speech was broadcast by radio in a popular time slot, bringing Howard to national prominence. Howard brought his friend Paul Robeson, a famous actor and singer, to Iowa in April 1948 to campaign for Wallace.

Later that year, Howard toured the United States to promote the Progressive Party, both with and without Robeson. Howard and Robeson traveled on behalf of the Progressive Party more than any other African Americans in 1948. As a campaigner, Howard was known for his ability to connect with other African American leaders in face-to-face conversations, while Robeson would draw large crowds.

Influenced by Robeson, Howard began to have more of an international outlook. In 1948, Howard worked with Charlotta Bass, W. E. B. DuBois, and Robeson to form a committee to fight Jim Crow laws and economic discrimination in the Panama Canal Zone. This effort was, in part, inspired by the work of other Black advocacy groups to internationalize the American civil rights struggle. The FBI placed all four under surveillance for their civil rights work and their presumed ties to communism and the Soviet Union. Howard then publicly condemned the increase in government surveillance, investigations, and trials of civil rights leaders, peace activists, and alleged Communist Party members.

Howard was a leader of the National Association for the Advancement of Colored People (NAACP). However, he was at odds with the NAACP after it promoted Harry S. Truman, while claiming to be a nonpartisan organization. He wrote an editorial in The Crisis, saying, "The NAACP is no longer best serving the people who it was organized to serve, but has been sidetracked into serving the very interests it was organized to fight." He also chastised The Crisis for its treatment of Robeson, at the time an NAACP board member whose progressive and communist leanings were beginning to be at odds with those in control.

Howard and Robeson attended an anniversary celebration of the Bolshevik Revolution at the Soviet Embassy in Washington, D.C. in 1950. A month later, Howard was a U.S. delegate to the communist-sponsored World Peace Council; this event was held in 1950 behind the Iron Curtain in Warsaw, Poland. (Note: Others participants in World Peace Council meetings were Louis Aragon, Jorge Amado, W. E. B. Du Bois, Howard Fast, Renato Guttuso, Frédéric Joliot-Curie, György Lukács, Pablo Picasso, Pablo Neruda, Diego Rivera, Paul Robeson, and Jean-Paul Sartre.) Howard was elected to the council's presidium. After the conference, Joseph Stalin invited Howard and other Americans to visit the Soviet Union. While in the Soviet Union, Howard made a speech for Radio Moscow, making positive comments about life under communism.

After his return to the United States, Howard and the eighteen other Americans who traveled to the Soviet Union wrote We Saw for Ourselves, published by the New World Review of the Communist Party USA. Howard was widely criticized for attending the World Peace Council and going to the Soviet Union. Not only did this negatively impact his professional career—the Polk County Bar Association filed disbarment papers against Howard weeks after his return from Europe—the Internal Revenue Service (IRS) placed a lien of $6,188 against his property for unpaid taxes two weeks later. Although released FBI files do not confirm a connection between Howard's misfortunes and his European travels, historian Athan Theoharis noted that the FBI was known to provide damaging information to bar associations in the 1950s to block admission to the bar or to assist with disbarment cases. Theoharis also believed that the FBI possibly used the IRS to "neutralize" Howard.

Howard then became interested in the post-World War II peace movement. We Saw for Ourselves noted that Howard was a founder of the American Peace Crusade. He was also involved with the Moral Re-Armament movement in Chicago, Illinois. This led to him traveling the world for both journalism and peace work, including touring many Eastern Bloc countries. The FBI again placed Howard under surveillance as a communist. In March 1953, FBI agents entered his former law office, copying records and seizing notebooks. This was covered by national news, including the Paul Harvey radio broadcast.

The FBI noted that Howard had donated money to the Council on African Affairs and attended meetings of the Midwest Committee for the Protection of the Foreign Born. Tom C. Clark, United States Attorney General from 1945 to 1949, identified both organizations and the World Peace Council as Communist and subversive. The American Peace Crusade was labeled communist by the Subversive Activities Control Board. Even Howard's essays for Freedomways were suspect, as J. Edgar Hoover had dubbed the quarterly publication as Communist.

Howard was also a guest speaker at the November 18, 1959, anniversary dinner of the National Guardian, a weekly newspaper that the House Un-American Activities Committee considered to be a propaganda arm of the Soviet Union. In 1962, conservative broadcaster Fulton Lewis Jr. noted, "Files of government agencies disclose that Howard has a record of pro-Communist activity dating back many years." Howard consistently denied that he was a communist, a communist sympathizer, or a communist dup; although he was communist adjacent many times. Later, his son, Charles P. Howard Jr. noted that his father did not join the communists after discovering that the communists also discriminated against Black people.

Howard attended a convention of Black nationalists in Detroit, Michigan, in March 1968, where there was a proposal to create the Republic of New Afrika, a Black homeland that would have been formed from five Southern states. The Black homeland movement was inspired by the teachings of Malcolm X, an acquaintance of Howard. Because of his extensive world travel and international contacts through his work as a UN correspondent, Howard was selected for the position of Minister of State and Foreign Affairs within the proposed country's provisional government. This again drew the attention of the FBI, which investigated Howard through July 17, 1968. In total, Howard was under FBI surveillance for 27 years, with their interest in him rising and falling depending on his activities and associations.

== Personal life ==
Howard was married to Maude Lewis, a native of Fayette, Iowa. They had a daughter, Mary Louise Howard, who died in 1920, and three sons, Joseph Howard, Lonnie Howard, and Charles P. Howard Jr. Joseph Howard was a lawyer and judge of the Supreme Bench of Baltimore. Charles P. Howard Jr. was a lawyer in Baltimore, Maryland, and Lonnie Howardwas a political science professor at Brandeis University. Maude died in 1954.

After Howard resigned from law in 1951, he left Des Moines for Chicago, Illinois. He moved to New York City, New York, in 1958 and lived at 1270 Fifth Avenue. Howard was a member of the American Legion and the African Methodist Episcopal Church. He was a 32 degree Mason and a member of the Benevolent and Protective Order of Elks. He also belonged to the YMCA and the Roosevelt Club in Des Moines.

Howard died of pneumonia on January 25, 1969, in the Lutheran Hospital in Baltimore, Maryland. Drake University and Tulane University both maintain archival collections related to Howard. In 2000, The Des Moines Register included Howard in its list of the ten most influencial Black Iowans.

== See also ==
- Des Moines, Iowa chapter of the Black Panther Party
- List of keynote speakers at United States presidential nominating conventions
