= Flynn–Griffin Building =

- U.S. National Register of Historic Places
- The Flynn–Griffin Building from the northwest

- Location within Iowa Location within the United States
- Location: 319 7th St. Des Moines, Iowa
- Coordinates: 41°35′11″N 93°37′33.1″W
- Area: less than one acre
- Built: 1885, 1906
- Architects: William Foster; Proudfoot & Bird
- Architectural style: Commercial
- NRHP reference No.: 16000215
- Added to NRHP: May 3, 2016

The Flynn–Griffin Building, also known as the Flynn Block, Peoples' Savings Bank Building, and the Edna M. Griffin Building, is a historic building located in Des Moines, Iowa, United States. It was listed on the National Register of Historic Places in 2016.

== History ==
The building was constructed in two stages. The first three floors were completed in 1885, and the top three floors were completed in 1906. Throughout its existence, it has housed retail space on the first floor and offices on the upper floors. Peoples' Savings Bank was located here from 1890 to 1929. The building is named for two influential Iowans, Martin Flynn and Edna Griffin. Flynn was an early Des Moines resident, livestock breeder, entrepreneur, and banker who had this building constructed. Flynn was one of the organizers of Peoples' Savings Bank, and it grew to prominence in the city. The building is the only reminder in the city of his contributions to Des Moines’ commercial sector.

By 1883 Des Moines had been nicknamed “Hartford of the West.” This indicates the central place the insurance industry played in the city's economic life. Insurance companies that maintained offices in the Flynn Block include Banker's Accident Co., Central Life Assurance Society, Aetna Life Insurance Co., National Life Insurance Co., Mutual Fire Insurance Co., Equitable Life Insurance Co., and Prudential Insurance Co.

After the bank vacated the first floor, it was converted to Katz Drug Store. Even though racial segregation was illegal in Iowa, it was a reality in practice. In 1948 Edna Griffin, along with her infant daughter Phyllis, John Bibbs, and Leonard Hudson sat at the lunch counter at Katz's and ordered ice cream. They were refused and told that the establishment "was not equipped to serve Negroes." Katz's was convicted of violating the state's 1884 civil rights law, and their conviction was upheld by the Iowa Supreme Court in 1949. Griffin came to be known as the "Iowa Rosa Parks", even though her act of civil disobedience predated Parks'.

== Architecture ==
The original three-story building was designed by Des Moines architect William Foster, a principal of the influential firm of Foster & Liebbe. The 1906 expansion was designed by the equally prominent firm of Proudfoot & Bird, who moved their office to the sixth floor of the building after construction was completed. The English Gothic Revival elements that marked the location of Peoples' Savings Bank from the 1906 renovation were removed in 1930 when the north half of the building was renovated for Katz's. Further alterations were made in 1984 and around 1995. The six-story U-shaped building rises to a height of 85 feet (26 m).
