= Sit-in movement =

American 1960s civil rights campaign

- Part of the Civil Rights Movement
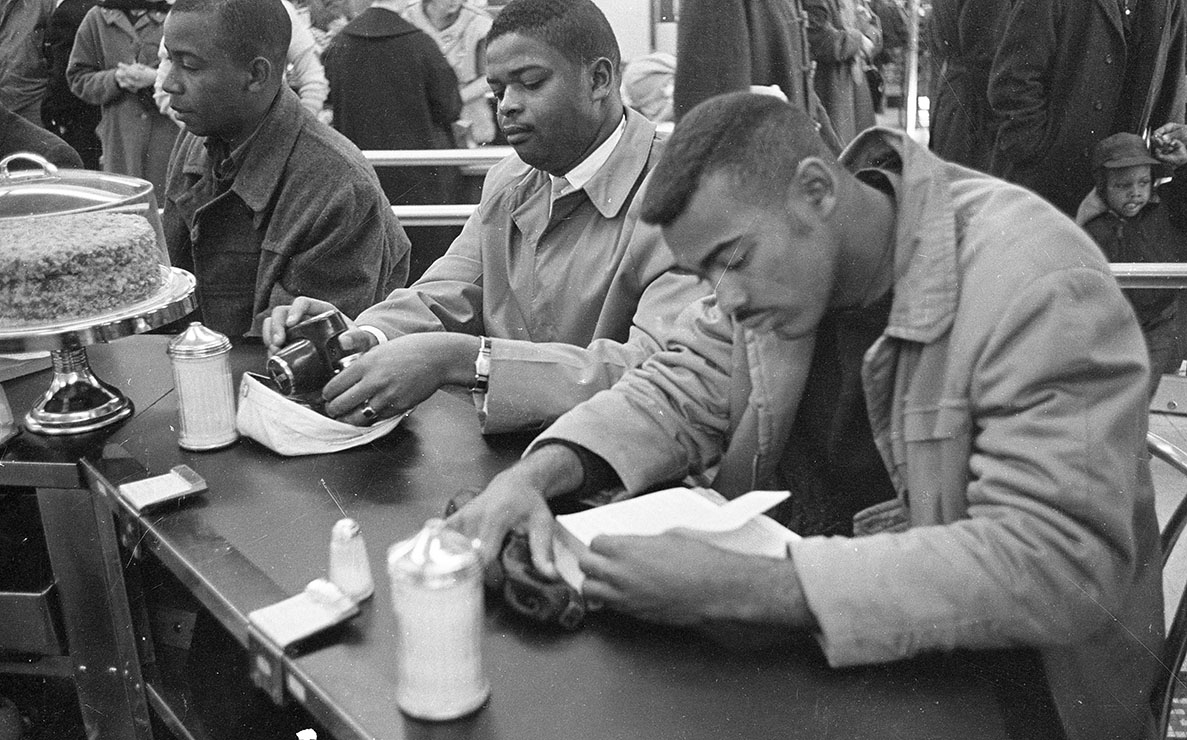
- Student sit-in at Woolworth in Durham, North Carolina on February 10, 1960
- Date: February 1, 1960 – 1964
- Location: United States
- Caused by: Racial segregation in public accommodations; Reaction to the Greensboro sit-ins

Parties
Student activists	Segregated businesses

The sit-in movement, sit-in campaign, or student sit-in movement, was a wave of sit-ins that followed the Greensboro sit-ins on February 1, 1960, led by students – Ezell Blair Jr., David Richmond, Franklin McCain, and Joseph McNeil – at North Carolina Agricultural and Technical Institute (A&T). Sit-ins challenging racial segregation had taken place in earlier years as well, including demonstrations in the Great Plains region in 1958–1960 and other cities prior to Greensboro. Even though the Greensboro sit-in was not the first sit-in, it sparked a wave of sit-ins that created the sit-in movement. The sit-in movement employed the tactic of nonviolent direct action and was a pivotal event during the Civil Rights Movement.

The sit-in movement took place during the 1960s, but sit-ins were occurring all over America many years before then. The idea for sit-ins first stemmed from the sit-down strikes during the labor movement. Due to the success of sit-down strikes, similar peaceful protest tactics were used to fight for civil rights. Some of the most influential sit-ins prior to the sit-in movement occurred in Chicago, Illinois in 1943. These sit-ins led by the Congress of Racial Equality (CORE) set a prime example of how sit-ins work and why they are effective.

African-American college students attending historically Black colleges and universities in the United States powered the sit-in movement. Many students in the United States followed their example, as sit-ins provided a powerful tool for students to use to attract attention. While they were often under-recognized, Black women played a significant role in organizing these efforts, particularly at Bennett College, where they helped organize sit-ins, plan meetings, and provide guidance to other participants, contributing to the movement's early growth. The students of Baltimore made use of this in 1960 when many used the efforts to desegregate department store restaurants, which proved to be successful lasting about three weeks. This was one small role Baltimore played in the civil rights movement of the 1960s. The city facilitated social movements as it saw bus and taxi companies hiring African Americans in 1951–1952. Sit-ins also frequently occurred in segregated facilities in Oklahoma City between 1958 and 1964.

== Specific Examples ==
Students at Morgan State College in Baltimore, Maryland, successfully deployed sit-ins and other direct action protest tactics against lunch counters in the city since 1953. One successful student sit-in occurred in 1955 at Read's Drug Store. Despite also being led by students and successfully resulting in the end of segregation at a store lunch counter, the Read's Drug Store sit-in did not receive the same level of attention that was later given to the Greensboro sit-ins. Two store lunch counter sit-ins, which occurred in Wichita, Kansas and Oklahoma City, Oklahoma, in 1958, also proved successful and employed tactics similar to those of the future Greensboro sit-ins. The local chapter of the Congress of Racial Equality had had similar success. After witnessing the unprecedented amount of visibility that the 1960 sit-ins in Greensboro, North Carolina, gained in the wide-oriented mainstream media, Morgan students (and others, including those from Johns Hopkins University) continued sit-in campaigns that were already underway at department stores and restaurants near their campus. There were massive amounts of support from the community for the student's efforts, but more importantly, White involvement and support grew in favor of the desegregation of department store restaurants. The students received significant support from the community, and more importantly, White involvement in favor of desegregating department store restaurants grew.

While sit-ins were by far the most prominent in 1960, they continued to be a useful tactic in the civil rights movement in the years that followed. In February 1961, students from Friendship Junior College in Rock Hill, South Carolina, organized a sit-in at a segregated lunch counter. Internal organization and coordination among student groups were crucial to the success of sit-ins, allowing for effective planning of protests, communication across campuses, and rapid response to incidents of harassment or arrests. The students were then arrested and refused to pay bail. This was part of their "Jail, No Bail" strategy, they instead decided to serve jail time as a demonstration of their commitment to the civil rights movement. This tactic, which sought to drain city resources and highlight the moral justice of arrests, inspired similar actions across the South and drew national attention to local police brutality.

Another example of sit-ins that were a crucial part of the civil rights movement were the Albany, Georgia sit-ins that started in December 1961. In order to advocate for civil rights and desegregate public facilities in Albany, sit-ins, boycotts, and marches were used. The Freedom Rides of 1961 also played a crucial role, with activists participating in sit-ins at segregated bus terminals across the South to challenge segregation in interstate transportation. This and other strong actions helped propel momentum and eventually helped lead to the removal of segregation laws in the United States.

The sit-ins in Greensboro invigorated U.S. civil rights movements by reinforcing the success of other protests like the Montgomery bus boycott, which had shown how effectively a mass of people could change public opinions and governmental policies.

The sit-in movement was not just about the desegregation of lunch counters. Activists exploded across Southern cities and pressured local courts, forcing judges to rethink policies on public accommodations and the principle of “separate but equal.” Civil rights lawyers exploited such lawsuits to settle the claim that refusal of service in restaurants violates the 14th Amendment's Equal Protection Clause as standards to lay the groundwork for subsequent desegregation demands. The powerful images of peaceful students facing arrest and violence became national news and encouraged popular sympathy. And it was this mounting public pressure that would be instrumental in the passage of the Civil Rights Act of 1964, which outlawed segregation in public places and demonstrated that nonviolent protest could indeed drive real progress.

== Before the sit-in movement ==
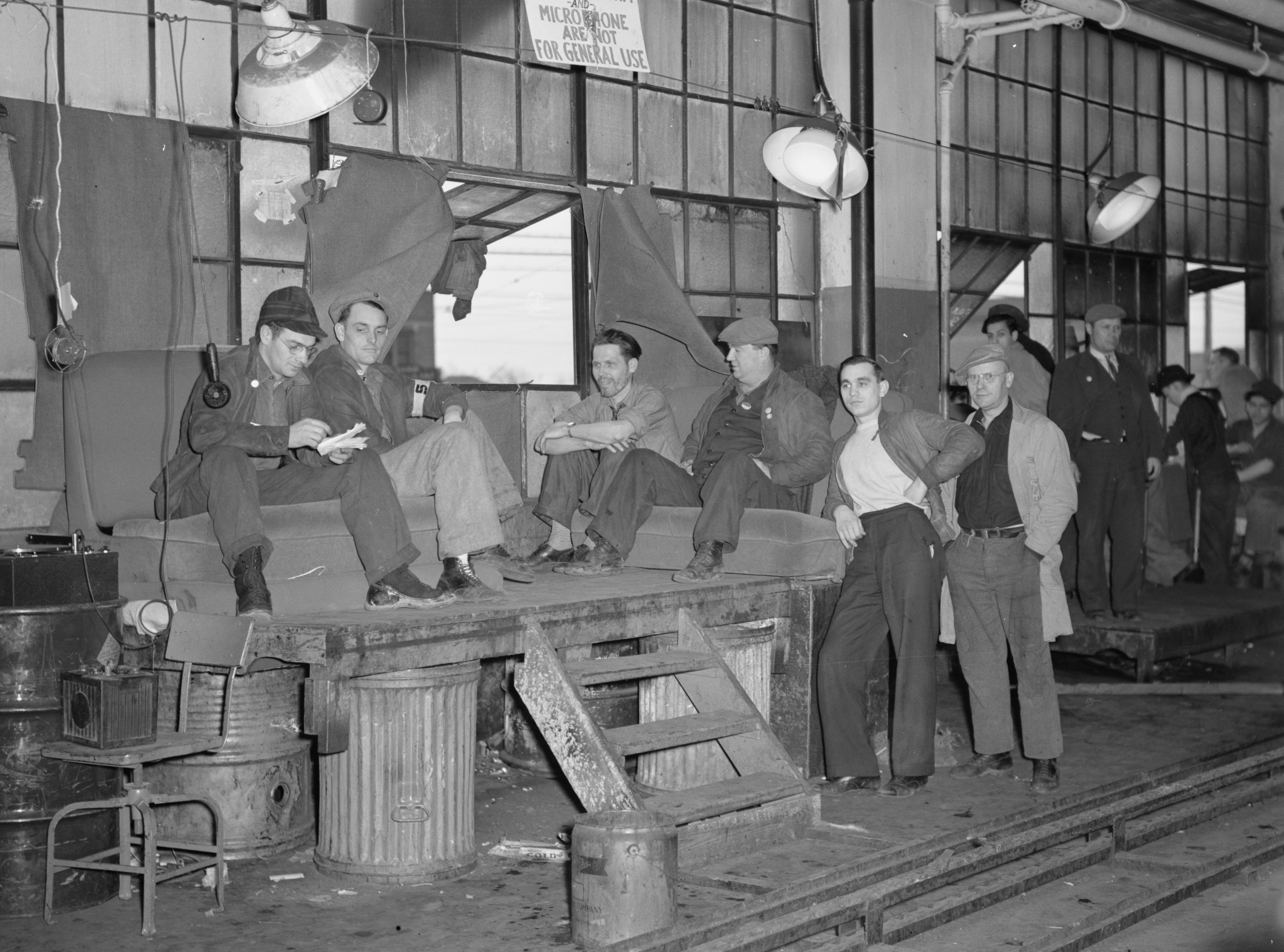
Image of workers guarding an entrance to the Fischer Body Plant in Flint, Michigan (1937)

The sit-in movement was an integral part of the civil rights movement. It provided African Americans with a way to peacefully protest the inequality of rights throughout America. Although sit-ins are primarily remembered as a tactic used throughout the civil rights movement to challenge segregation, sit-ins can be traced back to the "sit-down" strikes during the labor movement. The main goals of the labor movement were better wages, shorter hours, and safer working conditions. In order to advocate for their rights, workers would withdraw their labor through strikes. Although effective in some cases, many laborers were fired and replaced or given ultimatums to return to work. Because of the antiunion forces against workers, they developed the idea of the sit-down strike. As sit-down strikes were done by simply sitting down at one's work space and doing no work, employers could not replace the workers. The first successful use of the "sit-down" strike tactic was the Flint sit-down strike. This strike forced General Motors to recognize the United Auto Workers as the sole bargaining unit. Due to the effectiveness of this protest tactic, sit-down strikes continued throughout the labor movement and shifted into other movements such as civil rights.

As a result of the effectiveness of the sit-down strikes during the labor movement, similar peaceful protest tactics were adopted and brought into the civil rights movement. Many civil rights leaders such as Martin Luther King Jr. and Bayard Rustin studied the "sit-down" strikes of the labor movement to learn what aspects worked and could be applied to the civil rights movement. Although the sit-in movement took place during 1960, there were many sit-ins that took place before then. Some of the earliest sit-ins that took place during the civil rights movement were in Chicago, Illinois in 1943. The Congress of Racial Equality (CORE) was founded in Chicago in 1942 by a group of university students. As many public places in Chicago are still segregated despite the Illinois Civil Rights Act of 1885, CORE decided to take action at the diners and restaurants that were known for not serving Black individuals. Their first target was Jack Spratt's Coffee House as Black members of CORE had previously been turned away from dining there. Before the sit-in, attempts were made to make an agreement with the manager of Jack Spratt's but no consensus was reached. The Jack Spratt's sit-in took place on May 14, 1943, at 4:30pm when twenty-eight members of CORE (both Black and White individuals) demanded to be equally served in the dining area. Although it took multiple hours and police enforcement, all parties were served and the restaurant policy was changed. Due to the success of their first sit-in, CORE decided to keep their momentum going and attempt to fight the injustices at another restaurant that was known for its animosity towards African Americans. In June 1943 sixty-eight members of CORE participated in a sit-in at Stoner's Restaurant with the same goals. After pushback from the public and White CORE members, the Black members were eventually seated.

Although the Chicago sit-ins were not widely advertised at the time, they played an extremely influential role in the sit-in movement and the civil rights movement as a whole. Sit-ins continued throughout the 1940s and 1950s until the major sit-ins in 1960. The many sit-ins that occurred throughout the history of the civil rights movement eventually contributed to the signing of the Civil Rights Act of 1964.

== Outside support ==
One of the most significant contributions to the sit-in movement came from the legal community, especially civil rights organizations like the National Association for the Advancement of Colored People (NAACP) and the Student Nonviolent Coordinating Committee (SNCC). These organizations provided both moral and logistical support to the sit-in participants, helping them organize protests and, when necessary, offering legal assistance. The NAACP's legal team, led by Thurgood Marshall, helped to challenge the discriminatory practices that the sit-ins targeted, particularly segregation laws that allowed for public establishments to deny service based on race. By filing lawsuits and assisting with legal defense, the NAACP ensured that the sit-ins had both legal visibility and the ability to sustain their momentum in the face of arrests and other forms of resistance from local authorities.

In addition to legal support, the sit-ins received significant attention from the media. National and local newspapers, radio stations, and television networks covered the events extensively, bringing the difficult circumstances of African American youth to the forefront of the national conversation. The widespread media coverage of the sit-ins put pressure on local and state governments to address segregationist policies, while also motivating other activists and inspiring similar protests across the country. The media helped turn the sit-ins into a symbol of resistance that drew national attention to the deep-seated racial injustice common in American society.

Media coverage in the form of television, newspapers, and photographs had a critical role in shaping and expanding the sit-in movement. These images displayed students demonstrating peaceful protest and, in return, facing verbal abuse, being arrested, and dealing with severe hostility. These would generate sympathy throughout the United States and attract a lot of national awareness of racial segregation. The Greensboro sit-ins in 1960 attracted a lot of important attention from large outlets, causing other protests to be started in cities such as Atlanta, Richmond, and Nashville. Many scholars and activists have noted that this national attention pressured local businesses and public places to desegregate and also facilitated the formation of new student organizations, including the Student Nonviolent Coordinating Committee (SNCC). Scholars also highlight how the use of nonviolent protest, along with media coverage of the sit-in movement, was in shaping public opinion and contributing to more support for other civil rights movements. Furthermore, court cases and legal challenges that were shown in the media would highlight the sit-ins' importance and their role in challenging segregation. Media coverage helped turn local protests into a national movement, broadcasting their achievements across the nation and empowering others to do the same.

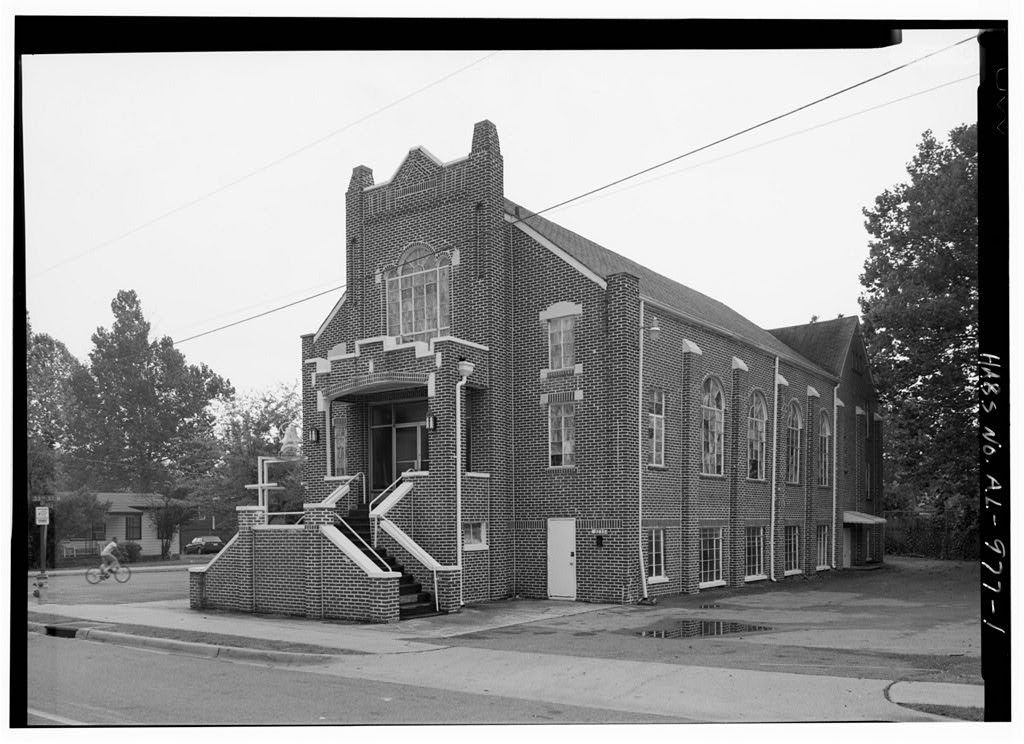
One of the many churches involved in aiding members of the sit-movement

Moreover, the sit-ins were supported by a broad alliance of faith-based groups. Religious organizations, particularly churches and clergy members, played a key role in providing sanctuary and moral support for the participants. Many church leaders not only provided spiritual guidance but also facilitated transportation, housing, and food for the activists involved in the sit-ins. These faith-based groups recognized the sit-ins as part of a larger moral struggle for justice and equality, and their support added further legitimacy to the movement.

Finally, the federal government, while initially hesitant to intervene, eventually became a significant player in supporting the civil rights movement. The Kennedy administration, particularly under the leadership of Attorney General Robert F. Kennedy, began to offer federal protection to sit-in participants, especially when violence erupted or when protesters faced unjust treatment. This federal involvement helped mitigate the risks for many activists, giving them confidence to continue their peaceful protests, knowing that they had some form of legal protection from federal authorities.

== List of sit-ins ==
=== Precursors to the sit-in movement ===
Start date	Sit-in(s)	Location	Ref.	Notes
August 21, 1939	Alexandria Library sit-in	Alexandria, Virginia		(Note: Five men participated in the sit-in organized by Samuel Wilbert Tucker.)
May 16, 1943	Jack Spratt's Coffee House	Chicago, Illinois		(Note: Led by Congress of Racial Equality (CORE).)
June 1943	Stoner's Restaurant	Chicago, Illinois		(Note: Led by Congress of Racial Equality (CORE).)
July 1948	Des Moines Katz Drugstore protests	Des Moines, Iowa		
1953	Baltimore	Baltimore, Maryland		
1954	Dresden	Dresden, Ontario, Canada		
January 20, 1955	Read's Drug Store	Baltimore, Maryland		(Note: The sit-in was conducted at Read's Drug Store.)
June 23, 1957	Royal Ice Cream sit-in	Durham, North Carolina		(Note: Participants include Douglas E. Moore.)
July 19, 1958	Dockum Drug Store sit-in	Wichita, Kansas		
August 19, 1958	Katz Drug Store sit-in	Oklahoma City, Oklahoma		(Note: Participants include Clara Luper.)
1959	Miami	Miami, Florida		

=== 1960s sit-ins ===
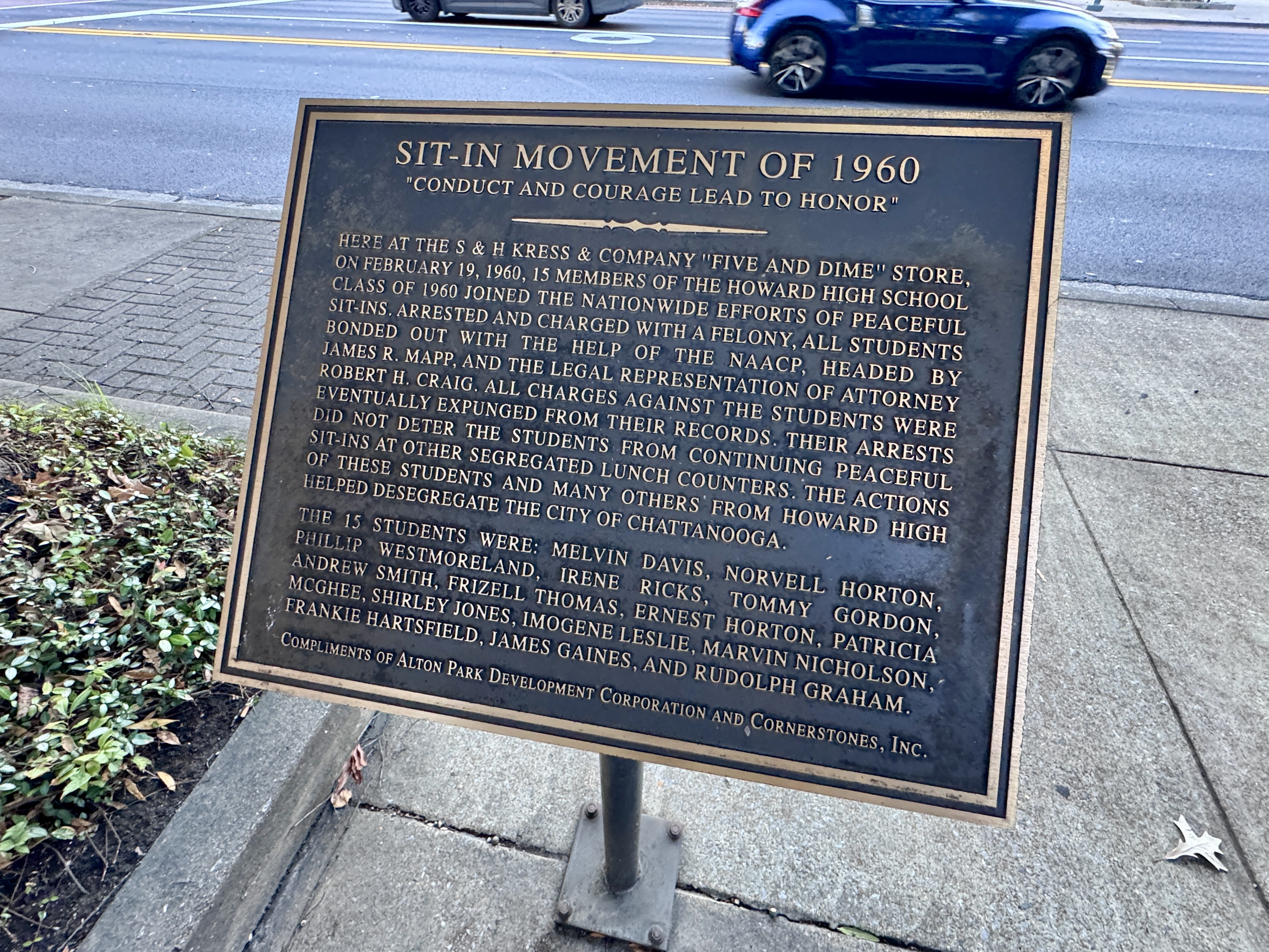
A plaque commemorating a sit-in that took place in February 1960 in Chattanooga, Tennessee

Start date (1960)	Sit-in(s)	University or college students	State	Ref.	Notes
February 1	Greensboro sit-ins	North Carolina A&T State University	North Carolina		
February 8	Durham	North Carolina College	North Carolina		
February 8	Fayetteville	Fayetteville State Teachers College	North Carolina		
February 8	Winston-Salem	Winston-Salem Teachers College	North Carolina		
February 9	Charlotte	Johnson C. Smith University	North Carolina		
February 9	Concord	Barber–Scotia College	North Carolina		
February 9	Elizabeth City	Elizabeth City State Teachers College	North Carolina		
February 9	Henderson		North Carolina		
February 9	High Point		North Carolina		
February 10	Raleigh	Saint Augustine's College	North Carolina		
February 10	Raleigh	Shaw University	North Carolina		
February 11	Hampton	Hampton University	Virginia		
February 11	Portsmouth		Virginia		
February 11	High Point	William Penn High School	North Carolina		(Note: Considered to be the first sit-in organized by high school students.)
February 12	Rock Hill	Clinton Junior College	South Carolina		
February 12	Norfolk		Virginia		
February 13	Nashville sit-ins	Fisk University	Tennessee		(Note: Participants during the February 20, 17 include Patricia Stephens.)
February 13	Tallahassee	Florida A&M University	Florida		
February 13	Tallahassee	Florida State University	Florida		
February 14	Sumter	Morris College	South Carolina		
February 16	Salisbury	Livingstone College	North Carolina		
February 18	Charleston		South Carolina		
February 18	Shelby		North Carolina		
February 19	Chattanooga		Tennessee		
February 20	Richmond	Virginia Union University	Virginia		(Note: A total of 34 students would participate and be arrested. They became known as the Richmond 34.)
February 22	Baltimore	Coppin State Teachers College	Maryland		
February 22	Frankfort	State Normal School for Colored Persons	Kentucky		
February 25	Montgomery	Alabama State College	Alabama		(Note: The sit-in targeted a state capitol cafeteria and was led by Bernard Lee accompanied by three dozen students.)
February 25	Orangeburg	Claflin College	South Carolina		
February 26	Lexington		Kentucky		
February 26	Petersburg	Virginia State College	Virginia		
February 26	Tuskegee	Tuskegee Institute	Alabama		
February 27	Tampa		Florida		
February 28	Chapel Hill		North Carolina		
March 2	Columbia	Allen University	South Carolina		
March 2	Columbia	Benedict College	South Carolina		
March 2	Daytona Beach	Bethune–Cookman College	Florida		
March 2	St. Petersburg		Florida		
March 4	Houston	Texas Southern University	Texas		(Note: Participants include Texas Southern University student and leader Holly Hogrobrooks. Also see Ku Klux Klan victim Felton Turner.)
March 4	Miami	Florida Memorial College	Florida		
March 7	Knoxville	Knoxville College	Tennessee		
March 8	New Orleans	Dillard University	Louisiana		
March 8	New Orleans	Southern University	Louisiana		
March 10	Little Rock	Arkansas Baptist College	Arkansas		
March 11	Austin	Huston–Tillotson College	Texas		
March 11	Galveston		Texas		
March 12	Jacksonville	Edward Waters College	Florida		
March 13	San Antonio		Texas		
March 15	Atlanta sit-ins	Clark College	Georgia		(Note: Participants include Morehouse College student Charles Person.)
March 15	Atlanta sit-ins	Morehouse College	Georgia		(Note: Participants include Morehouse College student Charles Person.)
March 15	Atlanta sit-ins	Morris Brown College	Georgia		(Note: Participants include Morehouse College student Charles Person.)
March 15	Atlanta sit-ins	Spelman College	Georgia		(Note: Participants include Morehouse College student Charles Person.)
March 15	Orangeburg	South Carolina State University	South Carolina		(Note: Resulted in the largest mass arrest (388) of the Civil Rights Movement up to that point.)
March 15	Orangeburg	Claflin College	South Carolina		(Note: Resulted in the largest mass arrest (388) of the Civil Rights Movement up to that point.)
March 15	Corpus Christi		Texas		
March 15	St. Augustine		Florida		
March 15	Statesville		North Carolina		
March 16	Savannah	Savannah State College	Georgia		
March 17	New Bern		North Carolina		
March 19	Memphis	Owen Junior College	Tennessee		
March 19	Wilmington		North Carolina		
March 19	Arlington		Virginia		
March 26	Lynchburg	Randolph-Macon Woman's College; Lynchburg College; and Virginia Theological Seminary and College	Virginia		
March 28	Baton Rouge	Southern University	Louisiana		(Note: Sit-in led to Garner v. Louisiana (1961) case.)
March 28	New Orleans	Xavier University	Louisiana		
March 29	Marshall	Wiley College	Texas		
March 31	Birmingham	Wenonah State Technical Institute	Alabama		
March 31	Birmingham	Miles College	Alabama		
April 2	Danville		Virginia		
April 4	Darlington		South Carolina		
April 9	Augusta	Paine College	Georgia		
April 12	Norfolk	Virginia State College (Norfolk Division)	Virginia		
April 17	Biloxi		Mississippi		
April 23	Starkville		Mississippi		
April 24	Charleston	Burke High School	South Carolina		(Note: Led by James Blake and occurred at the Kress store on King Street.)
April 28	Dallas	Paul Quinn College	Texas		
June 9	Cherrydale sit-ins	Howard University	Virginia		
June 17	Baltimore		Maryland		(Note: Sit-in led to Bell v. Maryland (1964) case that involved Robert M. Bell.)Related post-1960 sit-ins

Date	Sit-in(s)	Location	Ref.	Notes
September 11, 1960	El Charro Mexican Restaurant	Flagstaff, Arizona		
January 31, 1961	Rock Hill	South Carolina		(Note: Students from Friendship Junior College protested. A group of nine students known as the Friendship Nine would use the "jail no bail" tactic later duplicated by other protestors. The sit-in is regarded as the first to use the tactic, but Christopher W. Schmidt challenges this assertion. Patricia Stephens Due is sometimes credited as the first to use the tactic.)
November 1, 1961	Albany State College Bus Terminal	Albany, Georgia		
1962	Claramont Restaurant	Sewanee, Tennessee		(Note: Participants include Bruce W. Klunder.)
March 28, 1963	Rome sit-ins	Rome, Georgia		
May 28, 1963	Woolworth's	Jackson, Mississippi		(Note: Participants include Pearlena Lewis and Anne Moody.)
March 7, 1964	Audubon Regional Library	Clinton, Louisiana		(Note: Sit-in led to Brown v. Louisiana (1966) case.)

== See also ==
- The Children, 1999 book on the Nashville Student Movement
- Women's War
- Julius sip-in, LGBT protest inspired by the sit-in movement
