= Ron Walters =

Author and scholar

- Born: July 20, 1938; Wichita, Kansas, U.S.
- Died: September 10, 2010 (aged 72); Bethesda, Maryland, U.S.
- Spouse: Patricia Walters (c:a 1963-2010)

Academic background
- Education: Fisk University (BA); American University (MA, PhD)

Academic work
- Discipline: Political scientist
- Institutions: Syracuse University; Brandeis University; Howard University; University of Maryland

Ronald W. Walters (July 20, 1938 – September 10, 2010) was an American author, speaker and scholar of African-American politics. He was director of the African American Leadership Institute and Scholar Practitioner Program, Distinguished Leadership Scholar at the James MacGregor Burns Academy of Leadership, and professor in government and politics at the University of Maryland.

== Early life and education ==
Ronald William Walters was born in 1938 in Wichita, Kansas, the oldest of seven children of Gilmar and Maxine Fray Walters. His father was a career Army officer and later a professional musician, playing double bass. His mother was a civil rights investigator for the state. Ron attended grade school and junior high school in Wichita, and he graduated from Wichita High School East in 1955.

As president of the local NAACP Youth Council, then 20-year-old Walters organized the Dockum Drug Store sit-in in July 1958, which led to the desegregation of drugstores in Wichita, Kansas, more than 18 months before the more widely publicized Greensboro sit-ins began in February 1960.

Walters received his Bachelor of Arts degree in History and Government with Honors from Fisk University 1963 and both his M.A. in African Studies 1966 and Ph.D. in International Studies 1971 from American University.

== Career ==
Walters served as professor and chair of the political science department at Howard University, assistant professor and chair of Afro-American Studies at Brandeis University, and assistant professor of political science at Syracuse University. He served as visiting professor at Princeton University and as a fellow of the Institute of Politics at Harvard Kennedy School. He had been a former member of the governing council of the American Political Science Association. At the time of his death he was a current member of the Board of Directors of the Ralph Bunche Institute of the CUNY Graduate School and University Center. Walters was a distinguished member of Kappa Alpha Psi fraternity.

In 1984, Walters served as campaign manager and consultant for Reverend Jesse Jackson during his two presidential bids. He also served as the senior policy staff member for congressmen Charles Diggs, Jr. and William Gray.

Walters published well over 100 academic articles and seven books. One book, Black Presidential Politics in America, won the Bunche Prize.

Walters appeared on television many times, going on popular shows such as CNN's Crossfire, The Jesse Jackson Show, CBS News Nightline, and Evening Exchange. He appeared on radio shows such as All Things Considered and Living Room.

Walters was married to Patricia Ann Walters and lived in Silver Spring, Maryland. He died from lung cancer at the age of 72.

== Works and publications ==
- Black Presidential Politics in America
- Pan Africanism in the African Diaspora
- White Nationalism, Black Interests: Conservative Public Policy and the Black Community
- Freedom is Not Enough: Black Voters, Black Candidates, and American Presidential Politics
- The Legitimacy to Lead
- Standing Up in America's Heartlands: Sitting in Before Greensboro

== Awards ==
- Ralph Bunche Prize
- 2-time winner of the Best Book award from the National Conference of Black Political Scientists (NCOBPS)
- Distinguished faculty award from Howard University
- Distinguished Scholar/Activist Award, The Black Scholar Magazine
- W.E.B. DuBois/Frederick Douglas Award, African Heritage Studies Association
- Ida Wells Barnett Award, Association of Black School Educators
- Fannie Lou Hamer Award, National Conference of Black Political Scientists
- Distinguished Faculty Contributions to the campus Diversity, University of Maryland
- Wells-W.E.B. DuBois Award for Distinguished Scholarship from the National Council for Black Studies

== Sources ==
- Academy of Leadership: Ron Walters. (2005). Retrieved March 6, 2007 from https://web.archive.org/web/20071002033851/http://www.academy.umd.edu:80/AboutUs/staff/RWalters.htm.
- History Makers: Ron Walters Biography. (2003). Retrieved March 7, 2007 from https://www.thehistorymakers.org/biography/ronald-walters-39
- PBS Think Tank: Biography: Ron Walters. (2003). Retrieved March 7, 2007 from https://www.pbs.org/thinktank/bio_1275.html.
- Ron Walters. (2006). Retrieved March 6, 2007 from https://web.archive.org/web/20100606202939/http://www.bsos.umd.edu/gvpt/walters/
