= Read's Drug Store =

Chain of stores

Coordinates: 39°17′29.17″N 76°37′9.88″W

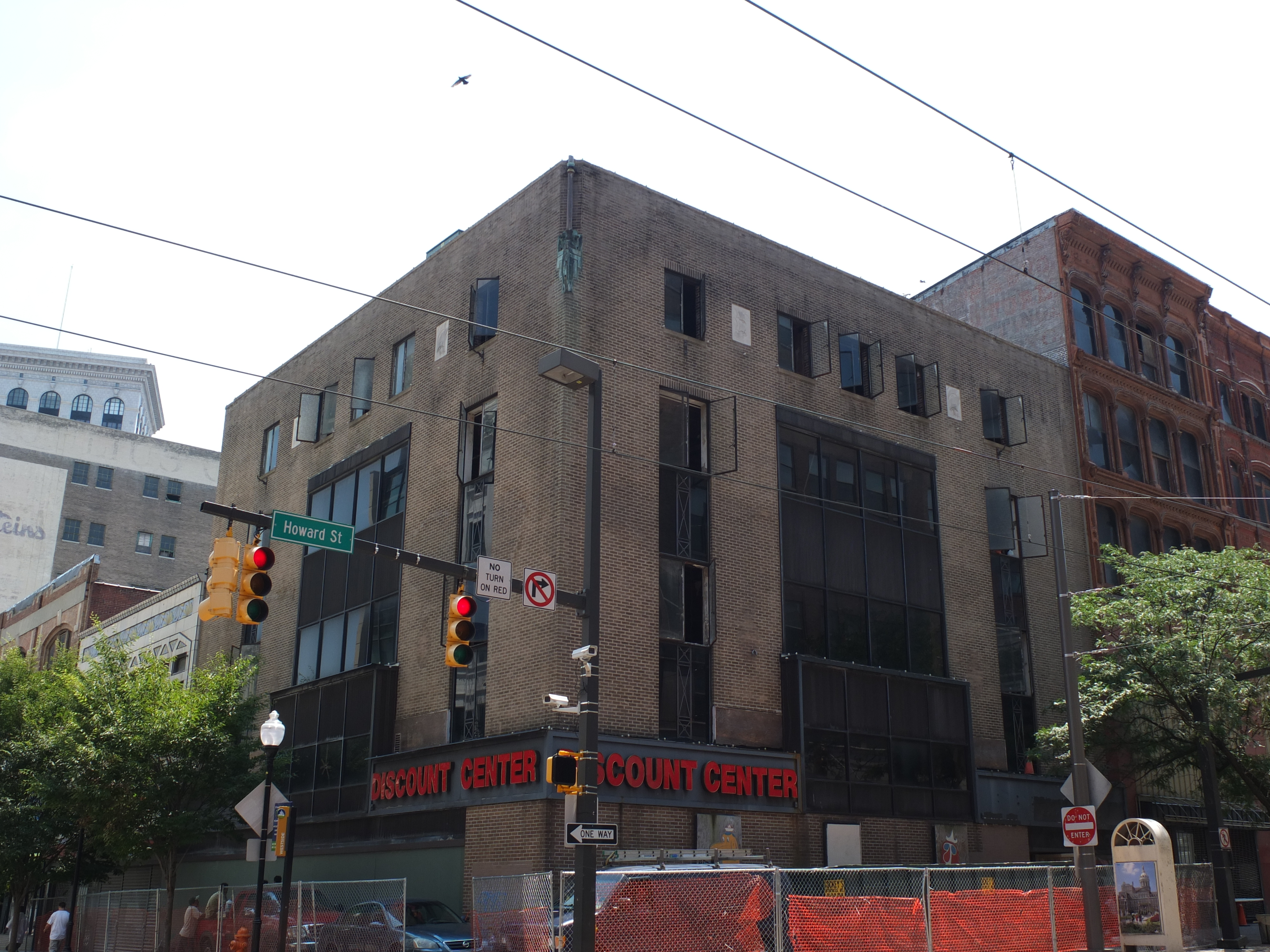
Read's Drug Store building in Baltimore; site of 1955 desegregation sit-in

Read's Drug Store was a chain of stores based in Baltimore, Maryland. Read's Drug Store was founded by William Read. He sold it to the Nattans family in 1899. The downtown store was constructed in 1934 by Smith & May, Baltimore architects also responsible for the Bank of America building at 10 Light St. In 1929, one company slogan was "Run Right to Reads." Read's was purchased from the Nattans by Rite Aid in 1977.

In 2023, Rite Aid filed for Chapter 11 bankruptcy amid several opioid lawsuits and declining sales. Despite Read's shutting down 40 years prior to the filing, Read's was still listed in the bankruptcy filing.

On May 5, 2025, Rite Aid filed for Chapter 11 bankruptcy for the second time in 2 years, listing assets and liabilities between $1 billion and $10 billion. Rite Aid will sell all of its assets as part of its procedure, as it overcomes financial challenges such as debt, increased competition, and inflation, including Read's Drug Store.

The downtown store was the site of an early sit-in during the Civil Rights Movement. Read's downtown Baltimore location has since closed, leaving behind an empty building. There is currently a controversy over whether to raze this building for development or preserve it and turn it into a civil rights museum. The store's 1955 sit-in also occurred five years before the more recognized, but also similar, student-led 1960 Greensboro sit-ins and Nashville sit-ins.

== Desegregation ==
The Read's store in downtown Baltimore (at Lexington St. and Howard St.) was the site of one of the country's first anti-segregation sit-ins. Students at Morgan State University joined up with a local chapter of the Congress on Racial Equality (CORE) to conduct a demonstration on January 20, 1955. The event was peaceful and lasted for only half an hour. Students sat at the lunch counter of both the Downtown location and the Northwood Shopping Center simultaneously. According to Dr. Helena Hicks, a participant in the protest and now a commissioner on the Baltimore City Commission for Historical and Architectural Preservation, the protest consisted of seven people who decided mostly spontaneously to enter the drug store. The NAACP confirmed that this was the first sit-in of its kind.

Two days later, the store was officially desegregated. Arthur Nattans Sr., then President of Read's, ran an announcement in the Baltimore Afro-American stating “We will serve all customers throughout our entire stores, including the fountains, and this becomes effective immediately.”

The relationship between protestors and store was not entirely combative. Ben Everinghim, a vice chairman of CORE in charge of negotiations with Read's, stated: "We feel that Read's management has been understanding and cooperative and we wish especially to compliment them and congratulate them at this time when they have been instrumental in the elimination of discrimination in such wide areas of the city."

Despite also being led by students and employing similar tactics, the Read's sit-in did not receive the level of fame that the Greensboro sit-ins and Nashville sit-ins did five years later.

== Historic Preservation controversy ==
In 2011, the Baltimore Commission for Historical and Architectural Preservation voted to grant temporary landmark status to the downtown store. This decision blocked the plan by Mayor Stephanie Rawlings-Blake and Lexington Square Partners to build a $150 million development on the site. The developers initially planned to raze the building but had later agreed to preserve two walls; preservationists argued that both plans were insufficient.

Activists want the building preserved and turned into a civil rights museum. They accuse the city of "demolition by neglect": avoiding minor repairs and allowing the building to collapse in order to make room for development.

Support for preserving the building comes from Baltimore Heritage, a non-profit historical preservation group, and the Jewish Museum of Maryland, which celebrates the Nattans' decision to desegregate early.

== See also ==
- Sit-in movement
- 1957 Royal Ice Cream Sit-in, occurred in Durham, North Carolina
- 1958 Dockum Drug Store sit-in, occurred in Wichita, Kansas
- 1958 Oklahoma City sit-ins, occurred in Oklahoma City, Oklahoma
- 1960 Greensboro sit-ins, occurred in Greensboro, North Carolina
- 1960 Nashville sit-ins, occurred in Nashville, Tennessee
- Baltimore's Bygone Department Stores: Many Happy Returns. The History Press. 2012. ISBN 978-1-60949-667-8.
