= Dockum Drug Store sit-in =

1958 US civil rights protest

- Part of the Civil Rights Movement
- Date: July 19 – August 11, 1958 (3 weeks and 2 days)
- Location: Dockum Drug Store, SE corner of Douglas and Broadway, Wichita, Kansas, United States; 37.68596°N 97.33548°W
- Caused by: "Whites only" lunch counters at various stores in Wichita, Kansas.; Racial segregation in public accommodations.
- Result: Desegregation of Dockum Drug Store in Wichita, then all Dockum stores in Kansas.

Parties
Students	Lunch counter at Dockum Drug Store

Lead figures
Participants: Ron Walters; Carol Parks; Daisy M. "Blue"; Galyn Vesey; 30 to 40 total	Dockum Drug Store: TBD

The Dockum Drug Store sit-in was one of the first organized lunch counter sit-ins for the purpose of integrating segregated establishments in the United States. The protest began on July 19, 1958, in downtown Wichita, Kansas, at a Dockum Drug Store (a store in the old Rexall chain), in which protesters would sit at the counter all day until the store closed, ignoring taunts from counter-protesters. The sit-in ended three weeks later when the owner relented and agreed to serve black patrons. Though it wasn't the first sit-in, it is notable for happening before the well known 1960 Greensboro sit-ins.

== Event ==
Twenty-year-old Ron Walters, president of the local NAACP Youth Council, organized the Wichita protest together with his nineteen-year-old cousin Carol Parks-Hahn who was the treasurer of the council and daughter of local NAACP secretary. Wichita was a midsize city of more than 150,000 people at the time, of which 10,000 were black. Wichita was heavily segregated in the late 1950s, with schools segregated up to high school and blacks excluded from public accommodations. While working at a job in downtown Wichita, Walters went for lunch to a Woolworth's store, which would only serve blacks bagged lunches sold from one end of the lunch counter. Walters recalls looking at the whites seated at the counter and felt humiliation and shame and felt his power and humanity was taken away. Seeking to find a way to protest against the practice, Walters and his cousin Carol Parks-Hahn met with attorney Frank Williams, who was the West Coast regional secretary of the NAACP. Williams described a sit-in by students at a California college who ended segregation at a campus restaurant by occupying it with students reading newspapers all day long. The protest was inspired by the actions of the Little Rock Nine and the earlier Montgomery bus boycott.

Using the sit-in by the students at the California college as a model, Walters and Parks-Hahn started to plan with Chester Lewis, a young attorney and the head of the NAACP. The plan they developed targeted Dockum, a downtown store that was part of the national Rexall chain, which had a lunch counter that only served white customers. Walters described Wichita as very segregated and as the "Mississippi up north". Parks-Hahn said at Dockum, they would only get served in disposable containers, blacks have never been served a glass or dishes. Anticipating a lot of attraction, Walters and Parks-Haun practiced the sit-in in the basement of the St. Peter Claver Catholic Church. They role-played what may happen, pretending to be a white folk taunting and embarrassed while another one would be well-dressed, courteous, and even-keeled. Walters recalled they believed firmly that their actions would be successful because they were right, but their confidence was not backed by a religious basis in the Southern movement, nor by the presence of a charismatic leader.

The lack of external support was also concerning after Herbert Wright, national NAACP youth secretary, sent a telegram to the NAACP youth of Wichita the night before indicating that the sit-in was not an NAACP tactic and would not receive the legal coverage from the NAACP. Although this was the case at the time, the wave of sit-ins in the South was backed by a team of NAACP lawyers. It was discovered later that the NAACP national office was avid about a "Montgomery model" of direct action and the sit-in did not follow such a model. In an effort to get more support from adults, Lewis tried to get the backing of the adult NAACP chapter, but they did not get involved. However, the adult board supported the youth group's plan and helped the students practice for the sit-ins and drove them to and from the protest.

Starting on July 19, 1958, ten well-dressed and polite students entered Dockum one by one, until all seats at the lunch counter were taken, seeking to place orders. Among twenty the participants were Parks-Hahn, Walters, Daisy Blue, Joan Smith, Arlene Harris, Carol Jean Wells, Janice Nelson, Duane Nelson, Robert Newby, Prentice Lewis, Galyn Vesey, and Gerald Walters. Parks-Hahn ordered a Coca-Cola from a waitress, who served it to her but then pulled it back when she realized that "store policy was not to serve colored people". The students told the waitress that they intended to stay until they could be served like everyone else. After a few hours, a waitress closed the blacks only fountain leaving only the whites only fountain open. Showing up a few days later, the students sat an hour without service until a waitress made a phone call after which a white male appeared. The man asked what the students wanted who again repeated their position after which the man retreated to his office.

By the second week, the students felt as though they were going to be successful as they sat at the lunch counters for long periods of times without service, which had to mean the store was losing money. Sometimes, when students did not fill the stools, a white person would walk in, look at the students and stare at the empty stool. They would realize what the students were doing and back away, which meant that they were participating in the boycott. At this point, locals heard that of the sit-in at Dockum and the store was starting to fill with curious people as well as shoppers. Walters recalls being interviewed by radio and newspaper reporters, but they never came back to follow up.

Along with shoppers, hostile people came to the store to taunt and threaten the students. Walters recalls a group of 15 to 20 tough white men gathered at the store, at which point he became worried for the students and in particular the two young women sitting at the counter. After one of the students called the police, they arrived 15 minutes later and scanned the store only to say that there were no disturbances being made. The manager also begged the police to take action as he feared his store would be destroyed, but the police shared that they wanted to keep their hands off this event.

Despite the constant hostility and taunting the students received, they continued to come in day after day and sit at the lunch counter. It started to become a popular movement among the youth, gaining support from students at Wichita University.

For three weeks, well dressed students, in age from fifteen to twenty-two years old, sat politely and quietly all day at the counters, enduring taunts and threats from white customers. The local daily newspapers, the Eagle and the Beacon, did not publish anything about it to avoid giving the sit-in any publicity. The local black-owned newspapers, the Enlightener and the Mid-West News PRess reported on the sit-in. The local chapter of the NAACP gave moral support and guidance, however, they did not participate in the student-led effort as they did not sanction sit-ins at the time.

== Results ==
After three weeks, on August 11, the manager came in and said "Serve them — I'm losing too much money". Lewis called Walter Heiger, the vice president of the Dockum drugstore chain, to confirm the new policy of integration. Heiger confirmed and instructed all of his stores to provide service to all people and all races. The students received recognition and acclaim from their community. Wright even visited Wichita and lauded the accomplishments of the students, even after he declared they did not have his or the NAACP's support. The students continued to target other drugstore lunch counters, however, the sit-ins were much shorter as the stores recognized the financial damage the student's protest had caused. Historian Gretchen Eick called the Dockum Drug Store sit-in as setting "a precedent that really began what would be a very significant strategy — a strategy that would change the way business was done in the United States". Ultimately, all of the Dockum locations in Kansas were desegregated.

In 1998, a 20-foot-long bronze sculpture was created at a cost of $3 million to mark the site of the successful sit-in, with a lunch counter and patrons depicting the protest.

=== Oklahoma City Katz Drug sit-in ===
Though the Dockum sit-in had attracted little media attention, about a week later on August 19, 1958, in Oklahoma City a nationally recognized sit-in at the Katz Drug Store lunch counter occurred. The protest there was led by NAACP Youth Council leader Clara Luper, a local high school teacher, together with young local students, including Luper's eight-year-old daughter, who had suggested the sit-in be held. The group quickly desegregated the Katz Drug Store lunch counters. Following the Oklahoma City sit-ins, the tactic of non-violent student sit-ins spread. The widely publicized Greensboro sit-ins began more than a year later at a Woolworth's in Greensboro, North Carolina, starting on February 1, 1960, launching a wave of anti-segregation sit-ins across the South and opened a national awareness of the depth of segregation in the nation.

== See also ==
- Sit-in movement - list of sit-ins
