= Barbara Ann Posey Jones =

African-American economist

- Born: Barbara Ann Posey; 1943 (age 82–83); Oklahoma City, OK
- Citizenship: USA
- Education: University of Oklahoma, A.B. 1963; University of Illinois, A.M. 1966; Georgia State University, PhD 1973
- Known for: leadership of sit-ins at lunch counters in Oklahoma City, Oklahoma in 1958-1959
- Spouse: Mack H. Jones.
- Children: 3, including Bomani Jones and Tayari Jones
- Awards: 2021 Suzan Shown Harjo Systemic Social Justice Award
- Scientific career
- Fields: Economics
- Workplaces: Clark College, Prairie View A&M, Alabama A&M University

Barbara Ann Posey Jones (born 1943) is an American economist who was a leader of the 1958 Katz Drug Store sit-in as a high school student. Since 1971, she has been a professor of economics, department head, and Dean at several historically Black Colleges and Universities in the American South. She is a past president of the National Economic Association.

In 2021, she was awarded the Suzan Shown Harjo Systemic Social Justice Award from the National Conference on Race and Ethnicity in Higher Education. In 2024, the University of Oklahoma awarded her an honorary degree, noting that her "participation in the Oklahoma City sit-ins helped in the desegregation of many public establishments across the country."

== Early life, activism, and education ==
Jones joined the youth council of the Oklahoma City NAACP at the age of 14, and on a visit to a freedom rally in New York City, ate at a lunch counter for the first time. On her return home, she became one of the spokespeople for the youth Oklahoma lunch counter sit-ins of 1958–1959. The Chi Zeta Chapter of Zeta Phi Zeta Sorority named her "Girl of the Year" of 1958, Datebook magazine published her article, "Why I Sit In" in 1960, and she gave a speech entitled "My America" at the 51st Annual NAACP Convention in June 1960. She graduated from the University of Oklahoma in 1963, and completed a master's degree in economics at the University of Illinois at Urbana–Champaign in 1966. There, she met her husband, political scientist Mack Jones, at a 1962 NAACP meeting. She completed a PhD in economics at Georgia State University in 1973.

== Economics career ==
Jones began her career at Texas Southern University and then continued work as an economics professor at Clark College (which became Clark Atlanta University), serving as department chair even before she finished her PhD. She taught there from 1971 to 1987, winning numerous teaching awards. She joined Prairie View A&M as department chair in 1987, quickly becoming Dean of the College of Business from 1989 to 1997. In 1997, she became Dean of the School of Business at Alabama A&M University, where she served as a professor of Economics until her retirement in 2016.

=== Research publications ===
- Jones, Barbara AP. "Black women and labor force participation: An analysis of sluggish growth rates." The Review of Black Political Economy 14, no. 2-3 (1985): 11–31.
- Jones, Barbara Ann Posey. The contributions of Black women to the incomes of Black families: an analysis of the labor force participation rates of Black wives. Georgia State University, 1973.
