= Katz Drug Store sit-in =

Protest against racial segregation in Oklahoma City

- Part of the Civil Rights Movement
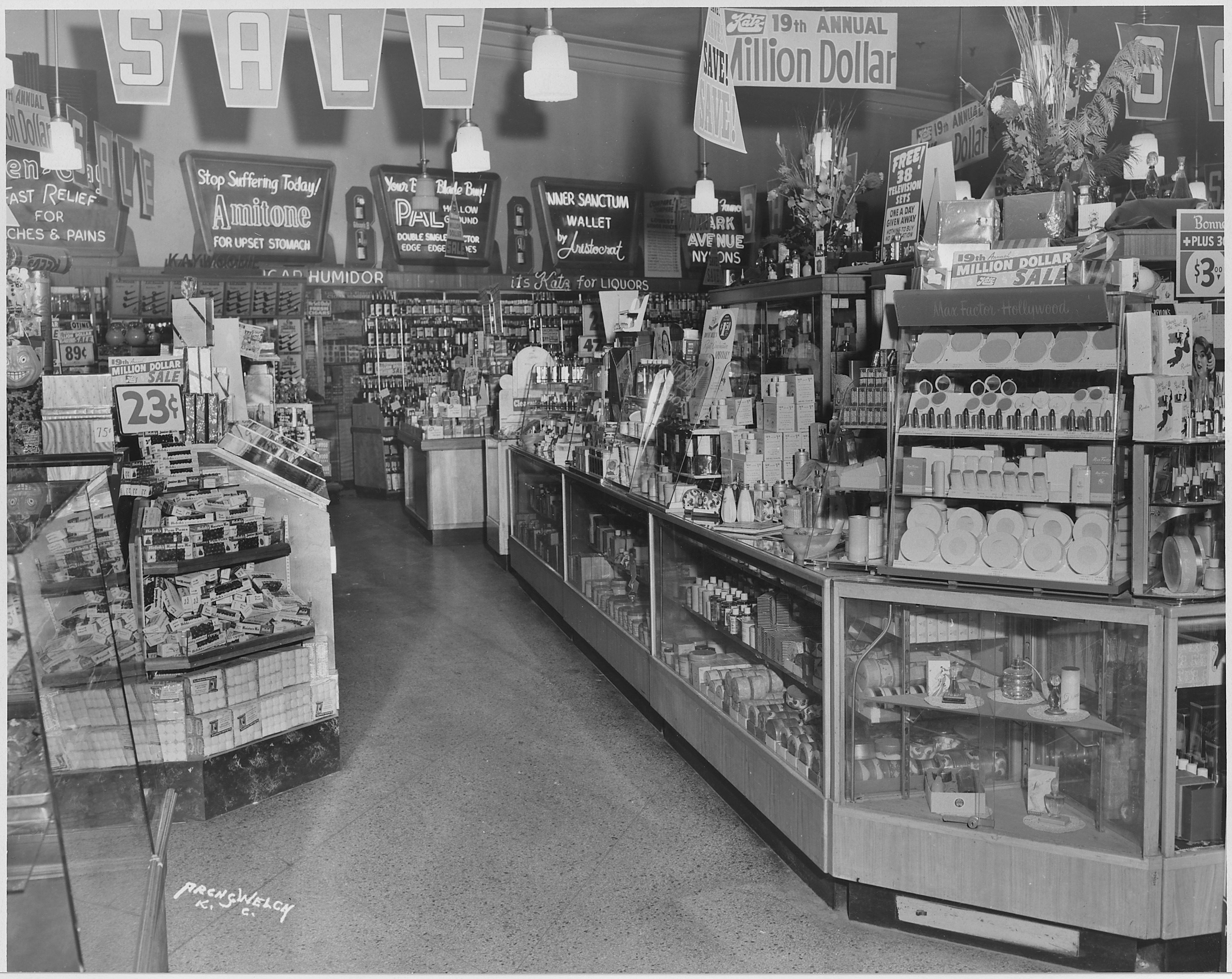
- The interior of a Katz Drug store
- Date: August 19–21, 1958
- Location: Oklahoma City, Oklahoma
- Caused by: Racial segregation in public accommodations
- Result: Desegregation of Katz Drug Stores; Expansion of sit-ins throughout Oklahoma City lunch counters, businesses, and public spaces for next six years

Lead figures
Clara Luper	

The Katz Drug Store sit-in took place between August 19 and August 21, 1958, when a group of Black students and their teacher held a peaceful sit-in at a Katz Drug Store in Oklahoma City to protest segregation. This sit-in came as a result of Oklahoma's existing state constitution and previous sit-ins around the area and country. The Katz Drug Store demonstration sparked major attention and a bigger sit-in movement across both the region and country.

== Contributing factors ==
When Oklahoma became a state, its state constitution contained strict regulations of segregation between Whites and Blacks, with several of those restrictions related to educational institutions and the types of teacher training permitted. Before the Katz Drug Store sit-in, there were the Wichita, Kansas sit-ins at Dockum Drug Store, which dealt with very similar conditions and exemplified the effectiveness of student activism and the popularizing nonviolent protest methods against corporations. The Kansas sit-in was planned by the Wichita chapter of the NAACP in an effort to desegregate the lunch counter and provide more respect for the African-Americans that worked downtown. The Oklahoma City sit-in was planned by the Oklahoma City Youth Council in 1957. This was led by Clara Luper, the council's adult advisor, and Barbara Posey. Due to the success of the Wichita sit-in, they were inspired to make a change in Oklahoma City stores, but added a letter campaign first. Luper's teaching philosophy, called a "freedom's classroom", focused on civic responsibility and hands-on learning. She designed her lessons to ready students for activism by linking classroom talks about democracy to real-life issues of segregation." Prior to the sit-ins, the group had attempted to negotiate via several discussions with local business owners which were never covered by the news and a series of unanswered letters, but was unsuccessful.

== The Civil Rights Movement outside of the South ==
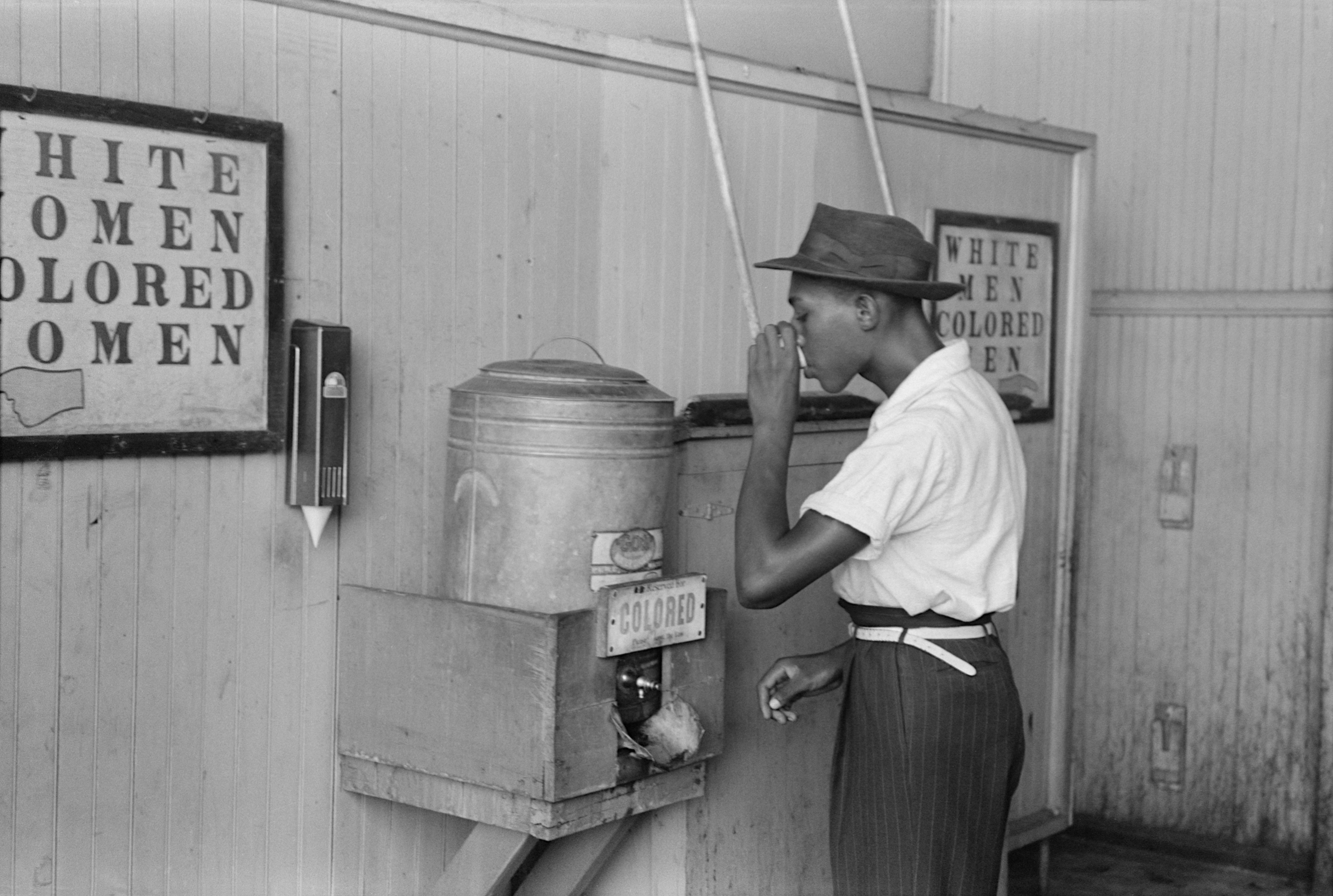
Segregation was commonplace in Oklahoma City, Oklahoma. This image exhibits segregation at one of the city's water fountains.

In popular memory, the Civil Rights Movement has often been framed in the South with sit-ins in Greensboro, North Carolina or Nashville, Tennessee. Additionally, it is quite common to believe that the “non-southern” picketing efforts were only a “by-product” of the segregation and discrimination being practiced in the South. However, although segregation was not necessarily legal in the North, it was still widely applied in places like schools and housing areas. This was not only practiced in the North, but also in the West too. For example, the western state of Oklahoma practiced legal segregation. Oklahoma continued this treatment towards Black people until the 1970s. Additional examples of racial discrimination and segregation occurring outside of the south come from the northern states of Michigan and Massachusetts. In 1963 in Detroit, Michigan, thousands marched in the "Walk to Freedom March" to speak out against the harassment and discrimination they were facing, especially against the police forces. Furthermore, in the early to mid 1960s, many parents in Boston, Massachusetts, led boycotts and sit-ins. They voiced their displeasure with the unfair treatment and segregation of Black students in public schools. Finally, at a local drugstore in the city of Oklahoma City in 1958, thirteen Black children that were led by Luper, their advisor, engaged in a sit-in to protest the segregation being practiced in the state and city. As exhibited, the northern and western movements were not simply extensions or direct products of the southern movement; rather, they were their own movements that utilized their own tactics (although similar to the southern movement's tactics) to further the goals of the Civil Rights Movement specific to their regions.

The Oklahoma City protest was not the first time a Katz Drug Store was at the center of desegregation efforts. A decade earlier, Edna Griffin led demonstrations against racial segregation at a Katz Drug Store in Des Moines, Iowa. Griffin's campaign mixed legal challenges with public protests. It led to the store's desegregation and set an early example for direct-action movements in public spaces. Even though this effort is often forgotten, the Des Moines protest influenced the tactics later used by Luper and her students in Oklahoma city. Some have pointed out that Luper's Youth Council knew about earlier sit-ins and drew inspiration from their successes, blending strong moral conviction with strategic nonviolence, while others have argued that Luper's "pedagogy of freedom" helped frame the Oklahoma city sit-ins as part of a larger movement against racial injustice that stretched from the Midwest to the South. These campaigns together showed how local actions, whether in Iowa or Oklahoma, were part of a growing national movement for civil rights that used everyday spaces to challenge segregation.

== The sit-in ==
In 1958, segregation in common areas, like businesses, was very much prevalent in Oklahoma City. There was no law requiring places open to the public to be segregated, but a lot of them still voluntarily chose to be. The strategy used to segregate their businesses was based upon "trespassing laws" and, therefore, were able to turn away any unwanted customers (specifically black people). Luper, a black high school teacher in Oklahoma City, was a civil rights activist and the advisor for the Youth Council of the Oklahoma City NAACP. Luper took a trip with her students to New York City to put on the play "Brother President," where they witnessed Black people living in a desegregated environment. They experienced integrated restaurants and other freedoms that Black people in Oklahoma City had not been accustomed to. After their return to Oklahoma, Luper's daughter Marilyn asked, "Why didn't I just go in and ask for a Coca-Cola and a hamburger?" in reference to the Katz Drug Store. This prompted Luper to stage a sit-in with thirteen of her Black students. Along with Luper, some notable students of the sit-in were Donda West and Barbara Posey, with other participants being Luper's children Marilyn and Calvin. Before the event, Luper gathered the students to teach them about the principles of civil disobedience and to train them on how to react to opposition. After months of preparation, the first day of the sit-in began on August 19, 1958, when Luper and the children sat down at the counter of the Katz Drug Store. They were refused service, but continued to come back for three consecutive days; the Youth Council waited patiently to be served as they sat on stools at the counter. The police remained close to the drug store in case any type of ruckus or disorder broke out. However, none was ever reported. They returned for two more days; on the third day of their protest, the store manager served them, ending segregation in the restaurant.

== Legacy ==
Sixty-five years later, Luper's daughter and one of the original protestors in the sit-in, Marilyn Luper Hildreth, continues to reflect on the impact her mother made in the Civil Rights Movement in Oklahoma and nationwide. Hildreth talks of her mother as a compassionate and inclusive soul, who strove to give every voice a chance to understand and respond to the world, stating: "[S]he was a mother to many other children, both in our community and in our society. She would always make room for another child". Even after the success of the sit-in, Hildreth fondly remembers her mother reading the Congressional Record everyday to stay informed and connected with the politics of a changing world, even publishing a memoir in 1979 titled Behold the Walls. From staging mock elections in her class to extending her kindness into the community with the NAACP, Luper stood for equality and confidence for the people around her. In Oklahoma today, Luper's legacy continues to be honored with the Freedom Center she started in 1967 and Clara Luper Civil Rights Center which was founded much later, gaining its first employee in 2021, both located in Oklahoma City. "Luper told reporters that the [Freedom] Center's goals were to provide opportunities for deprived children to grow up properly, to learn the value of self-help, and to see the adult world supported by a sense of belonging". From an interview with the project coordinator, Christina L. Beatty, the Clara Luper Civil Rights Center is an organization with the mission 'to insert and assert Oklahoma City's place in the national narrative of the civil rights movement and create a true pride of place for the northeast quadrant", including spreading Luper's legacy and that of the Katz Drug Store sit-in.

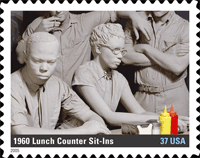
A 2005 commemorative stamp which acknowledges the impact of Civil rights sit-ins similar to the Katz Drug store protest in the 1960s

As a result of these sit-ins, Katz Drug Stores ended its segregation policies and integrated its lunch counters. The sit-in also sparked a series of protests throughout downtown Oklahoma City. For example, the Youth Council won service at Kress' Store and at Green's Variety Store. Furthermore, the Oklahoma City demonstrations and sit-ins sparked national attention and publicity. For instance, The New York Times wrote five stories describing the events that took place. Similar protests occurred throughout the city until 1964, when Oklahoma City passed an ordinance forbidding restaurants from refusing service or facilities to anyone based on race, religion, color, sex, or national origin. Oklahoma City's ordinance had much relation to the Civil Rights Act of 1964, which was actually passed two days before the ordinance went into effect: the Civil Rights Act of 1964 was passed on July 2, and Oklahoma City's ordinance went into effect on July 4. Other notable sit-in movements occurred across America during this same time period. Two of the most significant sit-ins that took place during this time included the Greensboro sit-ins and the Nashville sit-ins. These sit-ins are regarded as some of the most influential and impactful sit-ins of the Civil Rights Movement.
