= Clara Luper =

American civic leader (1923–2011)

- Born: Clara Mae Shepard; May 3, 1923; Okfuskee County, Oklahoma
- Died: June 8, 2011 (aged 88); Oklahoma City, Oklahoma
- Occupations: Civic leader, school teacher, activist, 1972 Oklahoma candidate for U.S. Senate
- Children: 2

Clara Shepard Luper (born Clara Mae Shepard May 3, 1923 – June 8, 2011) was a civic leader, schoolteacher, and pioneering leader in the American Civil Rights Movement. She is best known for her leadership role in the 1958 Oklahoma City sit-in movement, as she, her young son and daughter, and numerous young members of the NAACP Youth Council successfully conducted carefully planned nonviolent sit-in protests of downtown drugstore lunch-counters, which overturned their policies of segregation. The success of this sit-in would result in Luper becoming a leader of various sit-ins throughout Oklahoma City between 1958 and 1964. The Clara Luper Corridor is a streetscape and civic beautification project from the Oklahoma Capitol area east to northeast Oklahoma City. In 1972, Clara Luper was an Oklahoma candidate for election to the United States Senate. When asked by the press if she, a black woman, could represent white people, she responded: “Of course, I can represent white people, black people, red people, yellow people, brown people, and polka dot people. You see, I have lived long enough to know that people are people.”

Luper continued desegregating hundreds of establishments in Oklahoma and was active on the national level during the 1960s movements.

In a 2003 interview about the challenges she faced, she stated: "My biggest challenge, I think, was within myself – to believe that I could continue in spite of conditions. My biggest challenge that I could continue without knowing where our next dollar was coming from. And the main challenge and the main satisfaction was knowing that someday we’d be able to do what my father, who was a veteran in World War I, was not able to do, and that was to enjoy the privileges of first class citizenship."

== Early life and education ==
Clara Shepard Luper was born in 1923 in rural Okfuskee County, Oklahoma. Her father, Ezell Shepard, was a World War I veteran and laborer. Her mother, Isabell Shepard, worked as a laundress. Young Clara was raised in Hoffman, Oklahoma. She went to high school in the all-black town of Grayson, Oklahoma, and attended college at Langston University where, in 1944, she received a B.A. in mathematics with a minor in history. She was a member of Zeta Phi Beta, a historically Black sorority. In 1950, Luper became the first African American student in the graduate history program at the University of Oklahoma. She received an M.A. in History Education from the university in 1951.

== Civil rights activism ==
Luper became the advisor for the Oklahoma City NAACP Youth Council in 1957 while working as a history teacher at Dunjee High School in Spencer, Oklahoma. The message and success of Martin Luther King Jr. and the Montgomery bus boycott influenced her activism, along with personal tragedies related to segregation. With the Youth Council, she wrote and staged a play entitled Brother President about King's philosophy of nonviolence. In 1958, she was invited to bring the Oklahoma City Youth Council to perform Brother President for the NAACP in New York City.

The trip to and from New York was a formative experience for Youth Council members. The trip showed her students that there were places where segregation did not thrive. After their trip to New York, the students felt that they could not go back to segregation after experiencing what equality provides. On their return to Oklahoma the Youth Council voted to initiate a campaign of non-violent civil disobedience to end segregation in Oklahoma City. This marked the group's decision to go into Katz Drug Store to perform their first sit-in.

From 1958 to 1964 Luper mentored the members of the NAACP Youth Council during its campaign to end the segregation of public accommodations through sit-ins, protests, and boycotts.

=== Oklahoma City sit-ins ===
During her start as a civil rights leader for the NAACP Youth Council, she had plans to desegregate the restaurants and diners in Oklahoma. Her first target was Katz Drug Store, a segregated supermarket that had lunch counters. Before starting the sit-in, Luper had attempted to communicate with the owners by mail. She sent letters continuously to Katz but was ignored for 15 months. Finally, she agreed that enough time and effort had been committed to reaching out, and it was time to act. On Tuesday afternoon, August 19, 1958, Luper, her son and daughter, and a group of Youth Council members entered the segregated Katz Drug Store in downtown Oklahoma City and asked to be served. They were refused service, and the police were called. However, the group was not arrested, though they were met with increasing hostility and even threatened. While in the sit-in, she and her student waited from the time the shop opens until it closes. During this time, her students would bring out their books and study. Clara Luper was a civil rights activist, but she was a teacher first. Two days later, Katz corporate management in Kansas City desegregated its lunch counters in three states.

The 1958 Katz Drug Store sit-in had been suggested by Luper's eight-year-old daughter and occurred a year and a half before the February 1, 1960, Greensboro, North Carolina, sit-ins. It was one of the first sit-ins of the civil rights movement and sit-in movement, following the 1953 sit-ins at Morgan State College and 1955 sit-ins at Read's Drug Store.

The success of Civil Disobedience in Oklahoma could also be attributed to the lieutenant of the police force at the time, Bill Percer. Percer and Luper had a silent agreement that, he and his men would not harm her students if they practiced non-violence. Luper's students also provided an advantage to her cause. The fact that the protestors were mainly schoolchildren, it would be less likely that the sit-in would end in violence such as the one in Greensboro. The tactics, the students, and the police all had a major part in allowing the desegregation of Oklahoma to not end in violence.

From 1958 to 1964 Clara Luper was a major leader of the fight to end segregation in Oklahoma. She led the campaigns to gain equal banking rights, employment opportunities, open housing, and voting rights. Along with the NAACP Youth Council, she personally integrated hundreds of restaurants, cafes, theaters, hotels, and churches, including such notable Oklahoma City establishments as the Split-T drive-in and the Skirvin Hotel. She served on Governor J. Howard Edmondson’s Committee on Human Relations.

=== Activism at the national level ===
Luper was a prominent figure in the national Civil Rights Movement. She was active in the NAACP and attended the association’s annual conference every year with the Oklahoma City Youth Council. She took part in the 1963 March on Washington where Dr. King gave his “I Have a Dream” speech. She also took part in the 1965 Selma to Montgomery marches where she received a deep cut in her leg on "Bloody Sunday" when 600 civil rights marchers were attacked by state and local police with tear gas and billy clubs.

After 1964 Luper remained an important community figure as an activist, educator, and stalwart NAACP supporter. In these years, she expanded the range of her concerns to include advocacy for educational, economic, and political equality. In 1968, she was one of a handful of African American teachers hired to teach at Oklahoma City's Northwest Classen High School as part of the highly controversial court ordered school desegregation plan implemented that year. She was later reassigned to John Marshall High School (Oklahoma) where she continued to teach history and media studies.

=== Oklahoma City Sanitation Workers Strike ===
In August 1969, Luper was the spokesperson for striking sanitation workers in Oklahoma City. The sanitation workers sought a shorter work week, pay raises, and new grievance procedures. She supported the strike by allowing the workers to use the NAACP Youth Council’s Freedom Center in Oklahoma. The workers would use the Freedom Center to plan meetings and strikes. Clara, on the other hand, had been working to raise money to help these workers. She would often bring food to the Freedom Center for the workers to eat. The Oklahoma City sanitation strike began on August 19 and ended on November 7, 1969.

== 1972 campaign for U.S. Senator of Oklahoma ==
In 1972, Clara Luper was an Oklahoma candidate for the United States Senate. When asked by the press if she, a black woman, could represent white people, she responded: “Of course, I can represent white people, black people, red people, yellow people, brown people, and polka dot people. You see, I have lived long enough to know that people are people.”

== Civic engagement ==
Luper taught American history for 41 years, beginning at Dunjee High School and working at other Oklahoma City schools; she retired from John Marshall High School in Oklahoma City in 1991.

During the span of 1960 until 1980, Luper hosted a radio talk show, the Clara Luper Show, with her son. They would often discuss about the civil rights and the people that were instrumental.

Luper's students were so influenced by her civil rights success that they strived against segregation themselves. One of her students was the first African American chief of police in Oklahoma City. Another said she was the reason he went to become a US Army Colonel.

== Legacy ==
The Clara Luper Corridor, a multimillion-dollar two mile streetscape project announced by then Gov. Brad Henry connecting the Oklahoma State Capitol complex with the historically African-American area of Northeast Oklahoma City, began construction in 2005. It was named to commemorate her civil rights legacy.

Luper received hundreds of awards and was inducted into the Oklahoma Hall of Fame, the Oklahoma Women's Hall of Fame, and the Oklahoma Afro-American Hall of Fame, among others.

In December 2006, Luper was awarded an Honorary Doctorate from Oklahoma City University

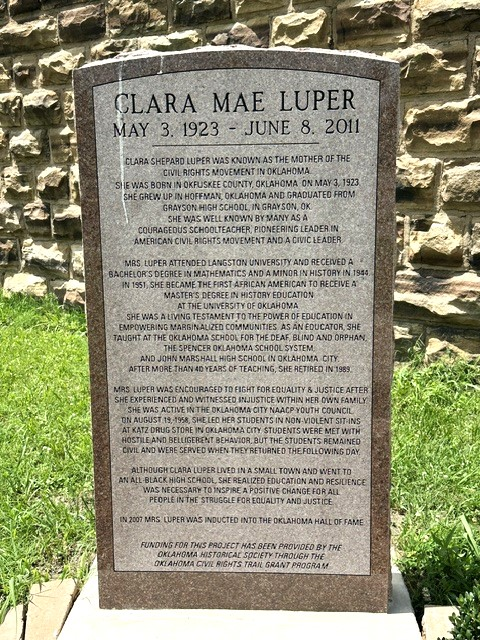
Grayson's Clara Luper Marker, June 2026

The Clara Luper Scholarship, a scholarship given by Oklahoma City University, has been awarded to a number of students every year. The scholarship is geared toward students of diverse backgrounds who have financial needs. The scholarship is meant to emphasize values that Clara Luper stood for, including community service, leadership, and education.

Luper died of natural causes on June 8, 2011. She is survived by her three children, Calvin, Marilyn Luper Hildreth, and Chelle Marie. Luper is also survived by a sister, Oneita Brown; five grandchildren; eight great-grandchildren; and one great-great-grandchild.

The Clara Luper Post Office Building, named in 2021, is located at 305 Northwest 5th Street in Oklahoma City.

A granite marker was erected in her honor in Grayson, Oklahoma, next to the stone remains of the school she attended there.

== University of Oklahoma Clara Luper Department of African & African American Studies ==
On March 7, 2018, University of Oklahoma President David L. Boren announced the naming of the Department of African and African American Studies in honor of longtime educator and civil rights leader Clara Luper, who made many contributions to diversity and inclusion efforts in Oklahoma. The announcement was made at the March 2018 meeting of the OU Board of Regents.

“We honor Clara Luper as a trailblazer for human rights and as a symbol of the university’s commitment to equal opportunity for all people,” said OU President David L. Boren.

== Oklahoma City Public Schools Clara Luper Center for Educational Services ==
In 2017 the Oklahoma City Public Schools began new administrative consolidation and restoration of a mid-century modern office building, a former bank building at 615 N. Classen which became the new OKCPS Clara Luper Center for Educational Services. The building houses the administrative staff as well as outreach programs for the teachers in the district.

== Downtown Oklahoma City Post Office ==
The U.S. House approved legislation September 16, 2020 to rename the downtown post office in Oklahoma City after civil rights pioneer Clara Luper. The measure passed by a voice vote and would rename the post office at 305 NW 5 St. the Clara Luper Post Office Building; that facility is currently known as the Center City Post Office. On December 18, 2020, the U.S. Senate approved the naming of the Clara Luper Post Office in downtown Oklahoma City, OK.

== Planned OKC Clara Luper Civil Rights Center ==
As part of the OKC MAPS project the Oklahoma City Council is planning a 20,000 square foot building with commemorative civil rights era displays. The facility will serve as a community center and will be open to local group meetings by civic groups.

== Literary works ==
Clara Luper's book Behold The Walls (1979) is an acclaimed first-hand account of the campaign for civil rights in Oklahoma City during the 1960s.

== See also ==
- List of civil rights leaders
- Sit-in movement
- Timeline of the civil rights movement

== Sources ==
- Carl R. Graves, "The Right to be Served," Chronicles of Oklahoma, 59:2 (1981), 163–168.
- Clara Luper, Behold the Walls (Oklahoma City: Jim Wire, 1979).
- Jimmie Lewis Franklin, The Blacks in Oklahoma (Norman: University of Oklahoma Press, 1980).
- Jimmie Lewis Franklin, Journey Toward Hope: A History of Blacks in Oklahoma (Norman: University of Oklahoma Press, 1982).
- Davis D. Joyce, ed., An Oklahoma I Had Never Seen Before: Alternative Views of Oklahoma History (Norman: University of Oklahoma Press, 1994).
- Linda Williams Reese, “Clara Luper and the Civil Rights Movement in Oklahoma City, 1958-1964” in African American Women Confront the West, 1600-2000 (Norman: University of Oklahoma Press, 2003).
- Stories in America--Oklahoma Sit-ins Conversation with Clara Luper
- Luper, Clara Shepard--Oklahoma Historical Society's Encyclopedia of Oklahoma History and Culture
- Uncrowned Queen Clara Luper
- Clara Luper Obituary
- Hevesi, Dennis (2011-06-11). "Clara Luper, a Leader of Civil Rights Sit-Ins, Dies at 88". The New York Times. ISSN 0362-4331.
