= Edna Griffin =

American civil rights activist (1909–2000)

Edna May Griffin
- Born: 1909; Lexington, Kentucky
- Died: February 8, 2000 (aged 90–91); Des Moines, Iowa
- Education: Fisk University
- Occupations: Civil rights activist, teacher
- Known for: Katz Drug Store protests
- Spouse: Stanley Griffin
- Children: Phyllis, Linda and Stanley

Edna May Griffin (1909 – February 8, 2000) was an American civil rights pioneer and human rights activist. Known as the "Rosa Parks of Iowa", her court battle against the Katz Drug Store in Des Moines in 1948, State of Iowa v. Katz, foreshadowed the civil rights movement and became a landmark case before the Iowa Supreme Court.

== Life ==
Edna Mae Williams was born in Lexington, Kentucky, in 1909 and raised in rural New Hampshire, later Massachusetts following her father's career as a dairy farm supervisor. Griffin claimed she learned to read with access to The Crisis, a publication of the NAACP. In 1933, Edna received a degree in English from Fisk University in Nashville, Tennessee, preparing her for a career as a school teacher. While at Fisk University, she protested against Mussolini's invasion of Ethiopia as well as met her future husband, Stanley Griffin. Edna and her husband moved to Des Moines, Iowa, on January 2, 1947, as Stanley was accepted as a student at Still College of Osteopathy and Surgery. During World War II she served in the Women's Army Auxiliary Corps at Fort Des Moines. Later, Edna and Stanley had three children: Phyllis, Linda and Stanley.

== Civil rights ==
Edna Griffin claims she did not experience discrimination growing up in New Hampshire but did later while living in Massachusetts. When she arrived in Des Moines, Griffin got involved with the Iowa Progressive Party and supported Henry Wallace in the presidential race.

=== Katz Drug Store ===
On July 7, 1948, Edna Griffin, John Bibbs, Leonard Hudson and Griffin's one-year-old daughter, Phyllis, were refused service at Katz Drug Store in downtown Des Moines because of racial discrimination. A waitress took their order for ice cream but after she was told not to serve them, she reported that they don't serve colored people. Requesting to talk to the manager only confirmed the denial of service at that establishment.

Griffin launched a campaign to force Katz to serve African Americans by leading boycotts, sit-ins and pickets. She also created a Committee to End Jim Crow at Katz. Griffin, Bibbs and Hudson filed civil suits against Katz. Edna was represented by Charles Howard and Henry McKnight, members of the local NAACP. The Polk County Attorney's Office prosecuted the Katz manager, Maurice Katz, under the 1884 Iowa Civil Rights Act which prohibited discrimination in public accommodations. Griffin testified against Katz in the criminal case. The manager was found guilty by an all-white jury and fined $50. The Iowa Supreme Court upheld the conviction in 1949. As a result of the civil case, an all-white jury awarded Griffin $1 in damages. Due to the work of Edna Griffin in the Iowa Supreme Court case, State of Iowa v. Katz, it became illegal to deny service based on race.

=== Later work ===
Griffin continued to be an active participant in the civil rights movement throughout the 1950s and 1960s. She founded the Des Moines chapter of the Congress for Racial Equality (CORE) being selected as the first president. Through the organization, Griffin planned a march from Ames to Des Moines dedicated to the mourning of four Birmingham children killed by white supremacists in a church bombing. With the financial support of her husband, they organized 40 Iowans to attend the March on Washington for Jobs and Freedom led by Martin Luther King Jr. in 1963. Even at the age of 75, she went to Nebraska and sat in the middle of the highway to stop nuclear warheads from being shipped into the Strategic Air Command at Offutt Air Force Base. Through the years, Griffin was a contributor to The Bystander, a local African American owned and operated newspaper.

== Legacy ==
Edna Griffin died on February 8, 2000. She has been honored as the recipient of many awards which include the Community Service Award from Blacks in Government (1993), Urban Dreams' Trailblazer Award (1998), and the Christine Wilson Medal for Equality and Justice (1998). Griffin was also awarded the YWCA's Mary Louise Smith Award as well as inducted into the Iowa Women's Hall of Fame (1985) and the Iowa African American Hall of Fame (1998).

The work of Griffin is also recognized throughout the community of Des Moines. On the 50th anniversary of her successful desegregation efforts, the Flynn Building (SE corner of 7th and Locust), prior home of the Katz Drug Store, was renamed the Edna Griffin Building. At the same time in 1998, the Iowa Civil Rights Commission dedicated a plaque on the building to the dedication of Griffin and others that fought for civil rights. Des Moines Mayor Preston Daniels declared May 15 as Edna Griffin Day. In 2004, a pedestrian bridge in downtown Des Moines was named after her.
