= NAACP Youth Council =

Branch of the NAACP

The NAACP Youth Council is a branch of the NAACP in which youth are actively involved. In past years, council participants organized under the council's name to make major strides in the Civil Rights Movement. Started in 1935 by Juanita E. Jackson, special assistant to Walter White and the first NAACP Youth secretary, the NAACP National Board of Directors formally created the Youth and College Division in March 1936.

== Mission ==
The mission of the NAACP Youth & College Division shall be to inform youth of the problems affecting African Americans and other racial and ethnic minorities; to advance the economic, education, social and political status of African Americans and other racial and ethnic minorities and their harmonious cooperation with other peoples; to stimulate an appreciation of the African Diaspora and other people of color's contribution to civilization; and to develop an intelligent, militant effective youth leadership

== Objectives ==
- Leadership and Activism Training
- Proactive Political and Community Activism
- Recruitment of new Youth Units
- Maintenance of existing Youth Units
- Public awareness of the necessity of youth involvement
- To be the leaders and trendsetters in the area of youth leadership and civil rights training

== Formation ==
The NAACP Youth Council was initiated in 1935 by executive secretary Walter White. White realized the need for a specified branch of the NAACP for the younger generation. At the time, the youth were considered members of the main adult branch, yet many of them had different opinions than the older generation. They had "a zeal and a zest and a fighting spirit which some of the older people in the Association [did] not have." In March 1936 the NAACP National Board of Directors called for new Youth and College Divisions to be created. White asked Juanita Jackson to be the first director of the Youth Councils and to channel the young energy into productivity. Jackson accepted the request and began traveling the country, mostly through the Southern states, recruiting students and organizing them into chapters. Once these councils were set in place, Jackson began to lead the students in educational seminars and protests against segregation.

On the historic first meeting of the Youth Council from June 29 to July 4, 1936, the students outlined their objectives for the division. They wanted to fight for equal education and economic opportunities, fair civil rights, and protection from lynchings. These goals were backed by the young people's passion and devotion to changing the society they were living in.

== Membership ==
The Youth Councils consist of members between the ages of 19 and 25. However, there are High School Chapters for anyone enrolled in high school or a comparable school and Junior Youth Councils for ages 13 and under. For older members, there is also the option of joining the local College Chapter, consisting of people under the age of 25 and/or enrolled in college or university. Members reaching the age of 25 can transfer membership into the adult branch.

In order to become a member of the Youth Council, a person must have good standing with the senior branch or reside in the vicinity of a Council chapter. If he or she meets all the requirements and paid the annual fees, then they are eligible to vote within the chapter. Any actions done within the Council must follow the regulations set in the youth council constitution.

The Youth Councils are represented in the NAACP by advisors who are also members of a senior branch. Each chapter has an advisor who leads their meetings, elections, and activities. An advisor is selected by the chapter at the Annual Meeting of the Youth Council. This person's name is then submitted to the senior branch for evaluation. If the Association accepts the person, they become the new advisor. However, if they are rejected, the Council must submit a new name or initiate the controversy process to appeal the decision.

== Activism in the civil rights movement ==
During the civil rights movement, the NAACP Youth Councils were actively involved in demonstrations, protests, sit-ins, and seminars to promote the concept of equality and fair society across the United States.

In the 1950s, the councils pushed for integrated schools and better education for black students. They were the instigators behind several educational milestone moments in the Movement such as Autherine Lucy's integration of Alabama University and the Little Rock Nine's accomplishments. Claudette Colvin, the first person to challenge the law after refusing to give up her seat on the bus in Montgomery, Alabama, in 1955, was a member of the local Council. Much of the Council's work was in Greensboro, North Carolina, where Josephine Bradley was the first black student to attend Greensboro High School. Other sit-ins and demonstrations carried out by the Greensboro Youth Council resulted in integrated lunch counters and equal job opportunities in the community. Additionally, in 1957–59, Lyman T. Johnson led the Louisville chapter's Youth Council to open downtown stores to African Americans, and the 1958 Oklahoma City Lunch-counter Sit-in, guided by activist Clara Luper, was organized by the local Youth Council. In the early 1960s the Louisville NAACP Youth Council led the boycotts called the "Nothing New for Easter" campaign that, with numerous arrests of juveniles with no previous jail records, forced over 80 percent of Louisville merchants to integrate their stores. In 1960, Velma Hill was elected the president of the Illinois-based NAACP Youth Council. She led a "wade-in" at the South Side Chicago Rainbow Beach, effectively desegregating the public beach.

The largest NAACP Youth Council during the Civil Rights Movement was the Peekskill, NY NAACP Youth Council from 1955 to 1956. The Council had over 400 members and over 80% were white. The President was Offie Wortham. The largest NAACP College Chapter during the Movement was the Antioch College NAACP College Chapter in Yellow Springs, Ohio. Over 90% of the members were white.

The youth Councils were devoted to creating better job opportunities for black Americans during the movement. By picketing and boycotting stores they put pressure on the local employers to change their hiring policies. These actions led to the hiring of more black citizens to work in stores and more employment opportunities. In 1961, Pittsburgh activist Dorothy Williams led the local council in protests that opened up jobs for black Americans in shoe stores, outlets, and numerous department stores.

In 1965, the NAACP decided that the Youth Councils needed to evolve to address more directly the situations in the inner cities. The councils became specifically in involved in the Community Action Project which centered on providing better education, housing, and employment options for poor black citizens living in the inner cities. The work that they accomplished through this program was largely successful. They were one of the leading forces behind the abolishment of urban slums and poor inner-city regions throughout the United States.

In addition to their founding principles, the councils had four goals for this time in particular. They wanted "(1) to inform youth of the problems affecting black and other minority groups; (2) to advance the economic, educational, social and political status of black people and other minority groups; (3) to stimulate an appreciation of the black contribution to civilization; and (4) to develop an intelligent and militant youth leadership through devising, working out and pursuing local programs." These precepts were held with a passion and vigor which carried the Youth Council through the movement and helped them accomplish many victories.

== Current Activism ==
The NAACP Youth Council is composed of hundreds of state and county-wide operations in which youth (usually teens) volunteer to share their voices or opinions with their fellow council members, and then strive to address the issues raised on a local or national level. Sometimes this volunteer work expands to an international scale. Today there are over 600 NAACP Youth Councils, high school chapters and college chapters addressing issues of social justice including education, economic empowerment, health, juvenile justice, and civic engagement.
