= Iowa Bystander =

African American newspaper (1894–2015)

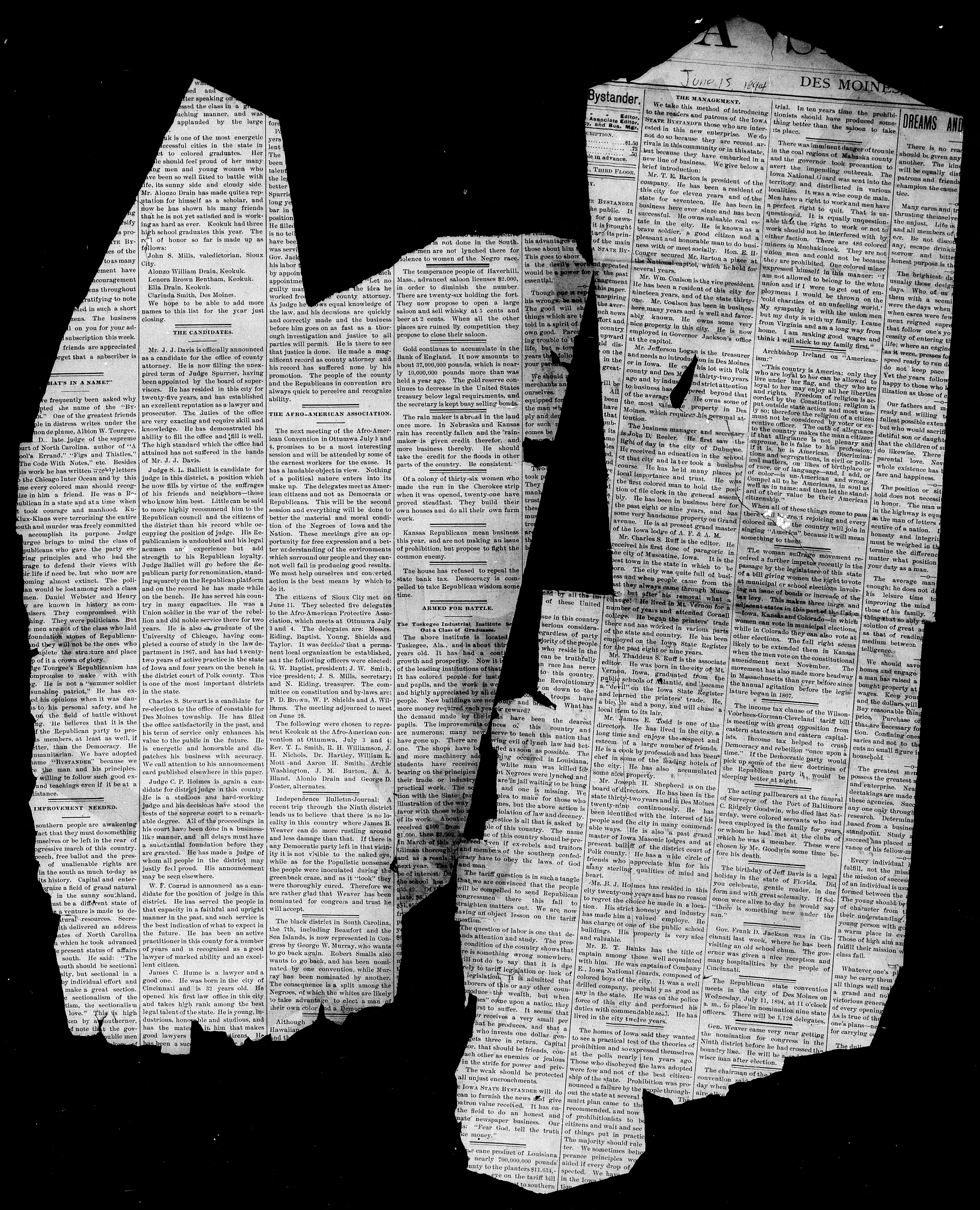
- Fragments of first issue of newspaper published in Des Moines, Iowa, June 15, 1894
- Type: Weekly newspaper
- Format: Broadsheet
- Publisher: IPJ Media, L.L.C.
- Editor: Jonathan R. Narcisse (deceased in 2018)
- Founded: June 8, 1894
- Ceased publication: 2015
- Headquarters: P.O. Box 98, Des Moines, Iowa 50301 United States
- Website: http://iowabystander.com

The Iowa Bystander was an Iowa newspaper serving African Americans. It was founded in Des Moines on June 15, 1894, by I. E. Williamson, Billy Colson, and Jack Logan, and it is considered to be the oldest Black newspaper west of the Mississippi. The paper was first called Iowa State Bystander; the term "bystander" given by its editor, Charles Ruff, after a syndicated column "The Bystander's Notes" written by Albion W. Tourgée, a civil rights advocate who wrote for The Daily Inter Ocean. The name was changed to Bystander in 1916 by owner John L. Thompson, who published the paper from 1896-1922. Thompson traveled around the state seeking new subscribers, raising the circulation to 2,000 copies, and changed the paper to a 6-column 8-page layout.

In 1922, Thompson sold the newspaper to Lawrence Jones who, within 2 years, sold the paper to World War I veteran and founder of the National Bar Association, James B. Morris for $1,700. Morris changed the name of the paper to Iowa Bystander. Morris and the paper developed close ties with the NAACP and fought the rise of the Ku Klux Klan in Iowa.

The Iowa Bystander was one of 20 papers represented at the first meeting of the National Newspaper Publishers Association, formed in 1940 by John H. Sengstacke, to support newspapers serving Black communities. Also that year, it was identified by Editor and Publisher as one of Iowa's four "leading Negro publications," along with the Tri City Observer (Davenport), the Iowa Observer (Des Moines), and the Sioux City Enterprise.

== Notable contributors and editors ==
- Eleanora E. Tate was news editor of the Iowa Bystander from 1966-1968
- Jonathan Narcisse, who ran for governor of Iowa in 2010 and 2014, was owner from 1990 until his death in 2018. He had transitioned the paper into a digital-only format.
- James B. Morris, founder of the National Bar Association, owned and ran the Iowa Bystander from 1922-1972
- Robert V. Morris, grandson of James B. Morris and author of Black Faces of War: A Legacy of Honor from the American Revolution to Today, ran the paper from 1979-1983 while he was still a college student
- Marie Ross, was news editor for the paper, and won two first-place awards from the National Federation of Press Women for her "Personal Touch" column.
