= Katz Drug Store =

Chain of pharmacies in the Midwestern US

Katz Drug Stores
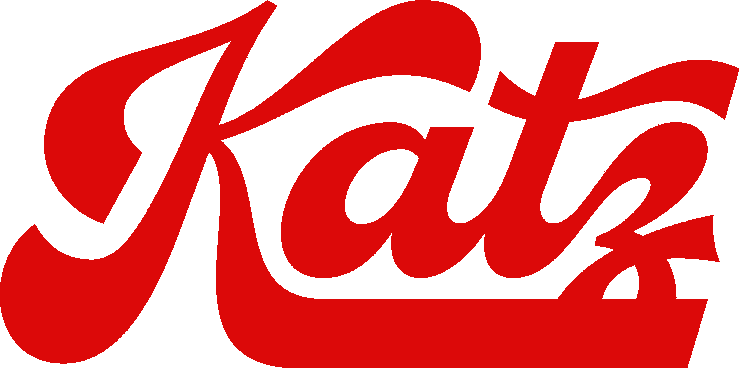

- The first Katz drug store
- Formerly: Consumer Value Stores (1914–1971)
- Industry: Retail
- Headquarters: U.S.
- Number of locations: 65 (peak, formerly)
- Products: Over-the-counter medicine

Katz Drug Store was a regional chain of pharmacies in the Midwestern United States.

== History ==
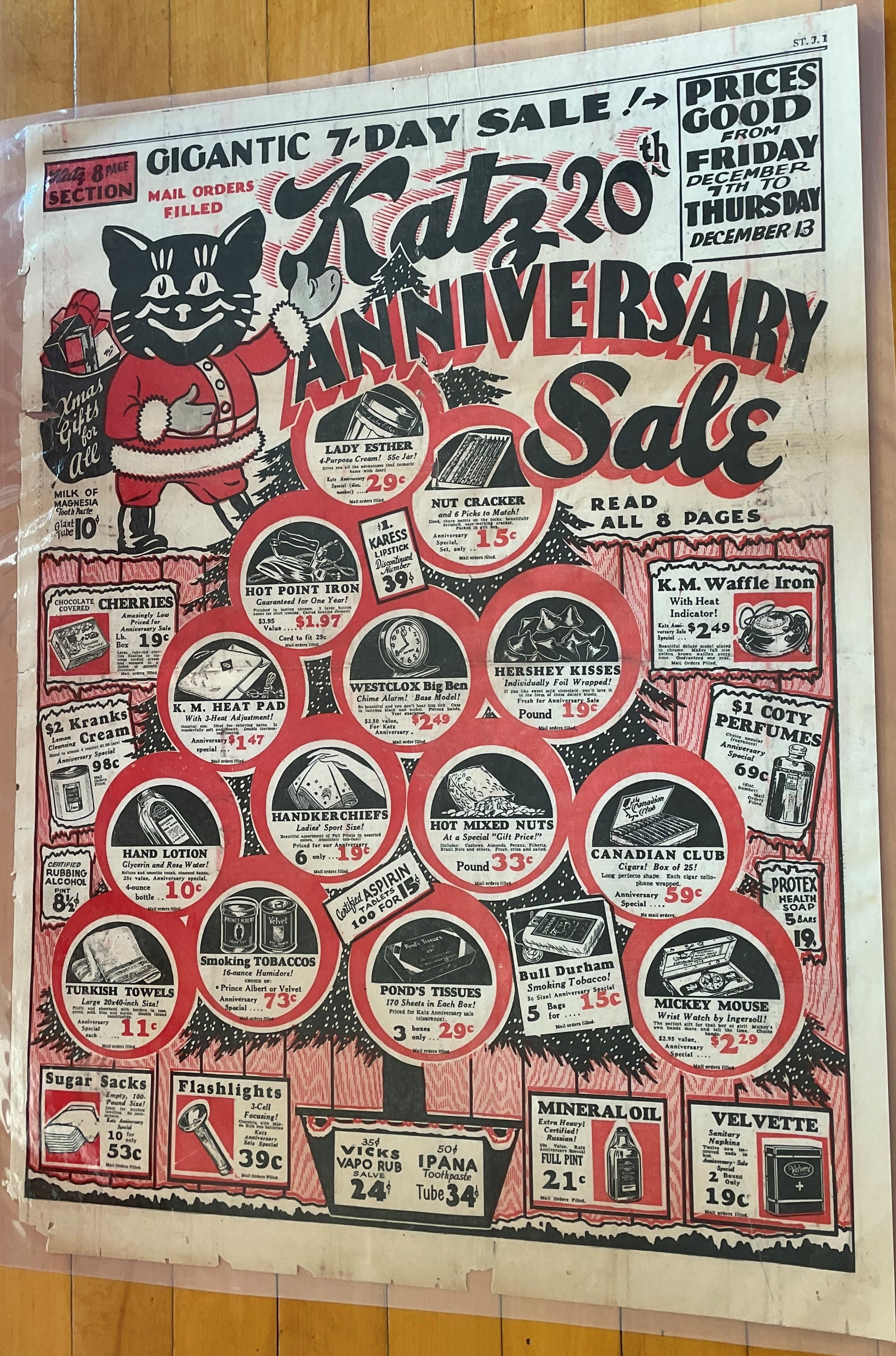
Katz Drug Store newspaper ad

In 1914, brothers Ike and Mike Katz opened two drug stores in Kansas City, Missouri that focused on low-cost branding, and they quickly grew to 65 stores in 5 states. At their peak, they generated over $100 million in annual sales and employed over 3,000 people. Self-service chain stores became more popular in the late 1960s and early 1970s, so Katz began losing market share. Katz sold itself in 1971 to Skaggs Drug Centers, which eventually merged with Osco Drug, which eventually merged with CVS Pharmacy.

== Katz Drug Store sit-ins ==
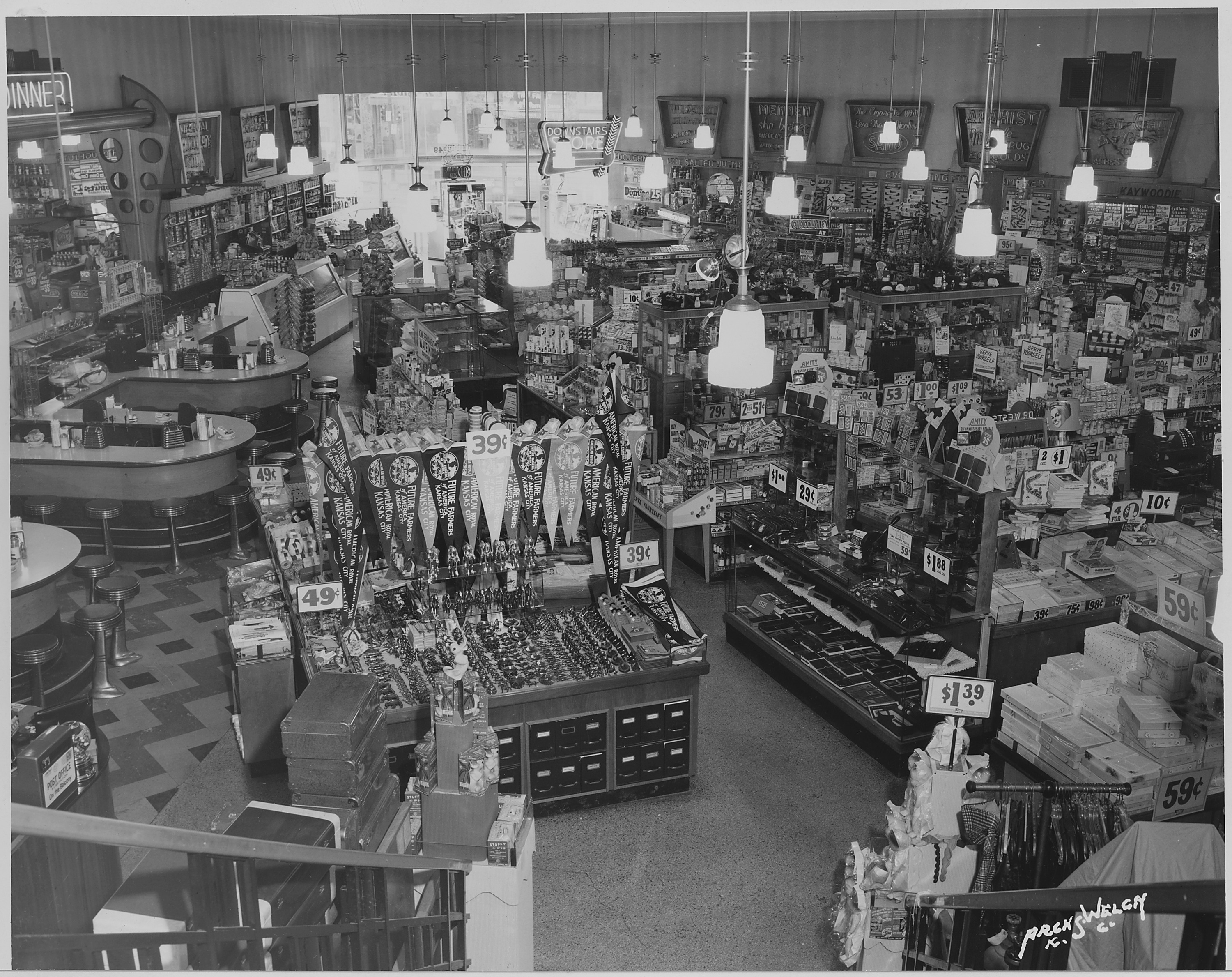
Katz Drug Store interior in Kansas City, Missouri

Katz Drugstores followed local segregation practices, meaning non-whites were often denied service at lunch counters. In 1948, Edna Griffin and her family were denied service at a Katz Drugstore in Des Moines, Iowa, which led to sit-ins and protests. In 1949 the Iowa Supreme Court determined Katz was in violation of the state's civil rights law. The six-story building has been renamed the Edna Griffin Building in her honor.

The 1958 Katz Drug Store sit-in was one of the first protests of its kind during the civil rights movement, occurring on August 19, 1958, in Oklahoma City, Oklahoma. In protest of racial discrimination, black schoolchildren sat at a lunch counter with their teacher, demanding to be served and refusing to leave until they were. They sought to end the racial segregation of eating places in their city, sparking a sit-in movement in Oklahoma City that lasted for years.
