= State v. Katz =

Civil rights case

State of Iowa v. Katz (241 Iowa 115, 40 N.W. 2d 41 (1949)) was a landmark civil rights victory involving the Katz Drug Store in downtown Des Moines, Iowa.

== Case synopsis ==
On July 7, 1948, at 3:45 p.m., Edna Griffin, her infant daughter Phyllis, John Bibbs, and Leonard Hudson entered the Katz Drug Store in Des Moines, Iowa, and ordered ice cream at the lunch counter. The manager refused to serve them, saying, "It is the policy of our store that we don't serve colored." Outraged members of the community responded with sit-ins and picketing directed at Katz and other local lunch counters that refused to serve people because of race.

The Polk County Attorney's Office prosecuted the Katz manager under Iowa's only civil rights law, a criminal statute prohibiting discrimination in public accommodations. The manager was found guilty by an all-white jury and fined $50. The Iowa Supreme Court upheld the conviction on December 13, 1949.

On December 2, 1949, civil rights attorneys Charles P. Howard Sr. and Henry T. McKnight, who was head of the local NAACP Legal Redress Committee, negotiated an agreement, which successfully ended Katz's discriminatory practices.

== Iowa Civil Rights Act ==
In 1884, the Iowa General Assembly enacted a law making it a crime to deny any individual "The full and equal enjoyment of the accommodations, advantages, facilities, and privileges of inns, restaurants, chophouses, eating houses, lunch counters, and all other places where refreshments are served, public conveyances, barber shops, bathhouses, theaters, and all other places of amusement," on the basis of such factors as race, religion, or ethnic background.

Prior to 1884, only Massachusetts, New York, and Kansas had enacted statutes that guaranteed African Americans and other minority groups equal opportunity in "places of public accommodation."

The Iowa state courts, however, tended to interpret narrowly the legislative intent of the 1884 Act. Because the public accommodations provision specifically enumerated types of facilities, the court construed that it necessarily meant to exclude from its operation those facilities not so listed. Many kinds of establishments catering to the public were therefore left untouched by this provision; these establishments retained an unfettered discretion to discriminate among their patrons on such bases as race, religion, or ethnic background. Among establishments that were exempt from the proscriptions of the 1884 Civil Rights Act, were retail stores, beauty shops and salons, parking lots, gas stations, schools, health clinics, doctors' and dentists' offices, hospitals, banks, loan companies, lawyers' offices, real estate brokers' offices, employment agency offices, as well as many others.

== See also ==
- Greensboro sit-ins
- International Civil Rights Center and Museum
- F. W. Woolworth Building (Lexington, Kentucky)
- Nashville sit-ins
