= High Point sit-ins =

Civil rights protest in North Carolina

High Point Sit-ins
- Part of the sit-in movement in the civil rights movement
- Date: February 11, 1960 February 18, 1960
- Location: High Point, North Carolina
- Caused by: "Whites Only" lunch counters at F. W. Woolworth Company; Racial segregation in public accommodations

Parties
Students from: William Penn High School; High Point Central High School; James B. Dudley High School	Business lunch counters at F. W. Woolworth Company

The High Point sit-ins were a series of nonviolent protests in February 1960 at a Woolworth's store in High Point, North Carolina. While not the first sit-in, it is thought to be one of the first sit-ins organized primarily by high school students.

The students were inspired by the Greensboro sit-ins that began earlier in the month. The protests lasted for one week and culminated after requests from then-mayor Jesse Washburn and the creation of the Human Relations Committee to investigate the issues that led to the sit-ins.

== Background ==
On February 1, 1960, Joseph McNeil, Franklin McCain, Ezell Blair Jr., and David Richmond, four black college students attending the North Carolina Agricultural and Technical State University, refused to leave their seats at a segregated lunch counter inside the F. W. Woolworth Company store in Greensboro, North Carolina. The students were refused service, but stayed at the store until it closed. The students returned each day and, by the fifth day of the protest, over 300 demonstrators came to the store. This protest helped spark a national movement of sit-ins across the Southern United States.

In the days following the February 1st sit-in, William Penn High School students, Mary Lou Blakeney (née Andrews) and Andrew Dennis McBride, along with High Point Central High School students, Miriam Lynn Fountain and Brenda Saunders Hampden (née Fountain), began to plan a sit-in at their local Woolworth's in High Point, North Carolina. William Penn High School was, at that time, High Point's all-black high school. A majority of the students who participated in the sit-in were William Penn students. High Point Central High, on the other hand, was an all-white high school that only recently became desegregated. Miriam and Brenda were its first black students.

== Organization ==
After initial discussions, the student organizers enlisted the help of civil rights activist, Reverend Benjamin Elton Cox, and retired school teacher, Miriam Fountain, Miriam Lynn and Brenda Jean's mother. Though Reverend Cox expressed concerns regarding their age, he agreed to train the students on nonviolent resistance at his Church. Eventually, the group grew to 26 students, and the decision was made to stage the sit-in on February 11 after school. When asked about her thoughts on being the first high school to organize a sit-in, organizer, Mary Lou Blakeney replied "we didn't think about all that. All we knew was that we were close to people doing the same thing"

== The Sit-ins ==
The students, led by Reverend Cox and his friend, Reverend Fred Shuttlesworth, left school at 4:00 PM and began to walk towards the Woolworth's on S. Main Street. On their way, they stopped at the local YMCA to pray. They then entered into the Woolworth's and walked around the store as if shopping and awaited a signal from Cox. At 4:29 PM, they received the signal and sat down at the lunch counter. Protesters were told that they would not be served, after which they continued to read and study at the counter. At 4:50, the Woolworth's manager closed the store early and the students left.

Students returned to the Woolworth's counter for several days. By the fourth day of the protest, other black community members had joined the protesters to walk to the store, but stayed outside to observe during the sit-in. Once students exited the store, a group of white people began to throw snowballs packed with shards of glass and coal at the students and black community members. While students remained nonviolent, the new protesters began to throw the snowballs back. Police eventually broke up the fight. Later that evening, a riot broke out in the area, which the High Point Enterprise denounced in an editorial the next morning.

In the wake of the riot, the mayor, Jesse Washburn, asked the students to stop their demonstration and formed an interracial Human Relations Committee to address concerns. Students agreed to stop their demonstration provided that lunch counters remained closed until the Human Relations Committee had concluded negotiations. On March 30, 1960, the Committee recommended a two-month trial period for integrated lunch counters; however, the committee had no power of enforcement.

== Legacy ==
While protests at the High Point Woolworth's ended in February 1960, the student organizers continued to work towards integration around the city. The sit-in movement expanded across the United States until the Civil Rights Act of 1964 mandated desegregation in public accommodations. In order to promote integration in public schools, the High Point school board voted in 1966 to close William Penn High School in 1968, at which point the county would "move to a completely integrated two-high school system." The school was eventually reopened in 2003 as an arts magnet school, Penn-Griffin School for the Arts.

In 2004, Mary Lou Blakeney founded the February 11th Association, which hosts an annual ceremony at the site of the old Woolworth's store. In 2008 a historical marker was erected at the site and, in 2009, a marble and bronze memorial was added. The Association's first banquet was held in March 2011 at the re-opened Penn-Griffin School for the Arts. The school organized its first "Freedom Week" the following year, during which students re-enacted the march to the location of the February 11th Monument and hosted a performance at the school.

The school has continued to commemorate the sit-in annually and, in 2024, it renamed its lobby the "February 11th Lobby."
