= Seizing Justice: The Greensboro 4 =

- Written by: Lynn Kessler
- Directed by: Lynn Kessler
- Narrated by: Anna Deavere Smith
- Country of origin: United States
- Original language: English

Original release
- Network: Smithsonian Channel
- Release: July 25, 2010

Seizing Justice: The Greensboro 4 is a 2010 television documentary film by Lynn Kessler for the Smithsonian Channel. It tells the story of The Greensboro Four through photographs, archival footage and interviews from Joseph McNeil, David Richmond, Franklin McCain and Jibreel Khazan, three of the four men who began the sit-in at Woolworth's in 1960 to protest segregation practices. The film also includes interviews from historians from the Smithsonian Museum of American History and civil right leader and congressman John Lewis.

The film aired on July 25, 2010 on the Smithsonian Channel.

== See also ==
- Civil rights movement in popular culture
- February One: The Story of the Greensboro Four
- February One monument and sculpture
- Sit-in movement
