= February One =

- A&T Four Monument
- Interactive map of February One
- Location: Greensboro, North Carolina United States
- Coordinates: 36°4′29.14″N 79°46′38.27″W
- Designer: James Barnhill
- Material: Bronze, Marble
- Length: 3 ft (0.91 m)
- Width: 10 ft (3.0 m)
- Height: 15 ft (4.6 m)
- Beginning date: 2001
- Completion date: 2002
- Opening date: February 1, 2002
- Dedicated to: Ezell Blair Jr. Franklin McCain; Joseph McNeil; David Richmond

February One (also referred to as the A&T Four Monument) is the name of the 2002 monument dedicated to Ezell Blair Jr., Franklin McCain, Joseph McNeil and David Richmond, who were collectively known as the "A & T Four” for their role in launching the Greensboro lunch counter sit-ins, which started on February 1, 1960. The 15-foot bronze and marble monument is located on the western edge of the campus of North Carolina A&T University in Greensboro, North Carolina. James Barnhill, the sculptor who created the monument, was inspired by the historic 1960 image of the four African American college students leaving the Woolworth store in downtown Greensboro after holding a sit-in to protest the company's policy of segregating its lunch counters. The sit-in protests were a significant event in the Civil Rights Movement due to increasing national sentiment of the fight for the civil rights of African-Americans during this period in American history.

== Artist ==
James Barnhill (born 1955) is a native of Asheville, North Carolina. He received a bachelor's degree in Art Education from the University of North Carolina at Chapel Hill and later a Master of Fine Arts degree in sculpture from University of North Carolina at Greensboro. Barnhill has won a number of awards for his works including: the Jefferson D. Ruben Memorial Award for classical sculpture and the Leonard J. Meiselman Prize for a ‘realistic sculpture done in the classical tradition.’ Other works of his include: Minerva, on the campus of UNC Greensboro; a bronze bust of Booker T. Washington for the Booker T. Washington National Monument; Angel of Montoursville, for the town of Montoursville, Pennsylvania honoring those that died during the TWA Flight 800 crash; and General Greene, a sculpture of Revolutionary War General Nathanael Greene commissioned by the city of Greensboro for its bicentennial celebration. Barnhill currently serves on the board of directors for the African-American Atelier, and has previously served on the board of directors for the North Carolina Arts Council and the Greensboro Art Alliance. Currently he serves as an Assistant Professor of Art at North Carolina A&T State University.

== Sculpture ==
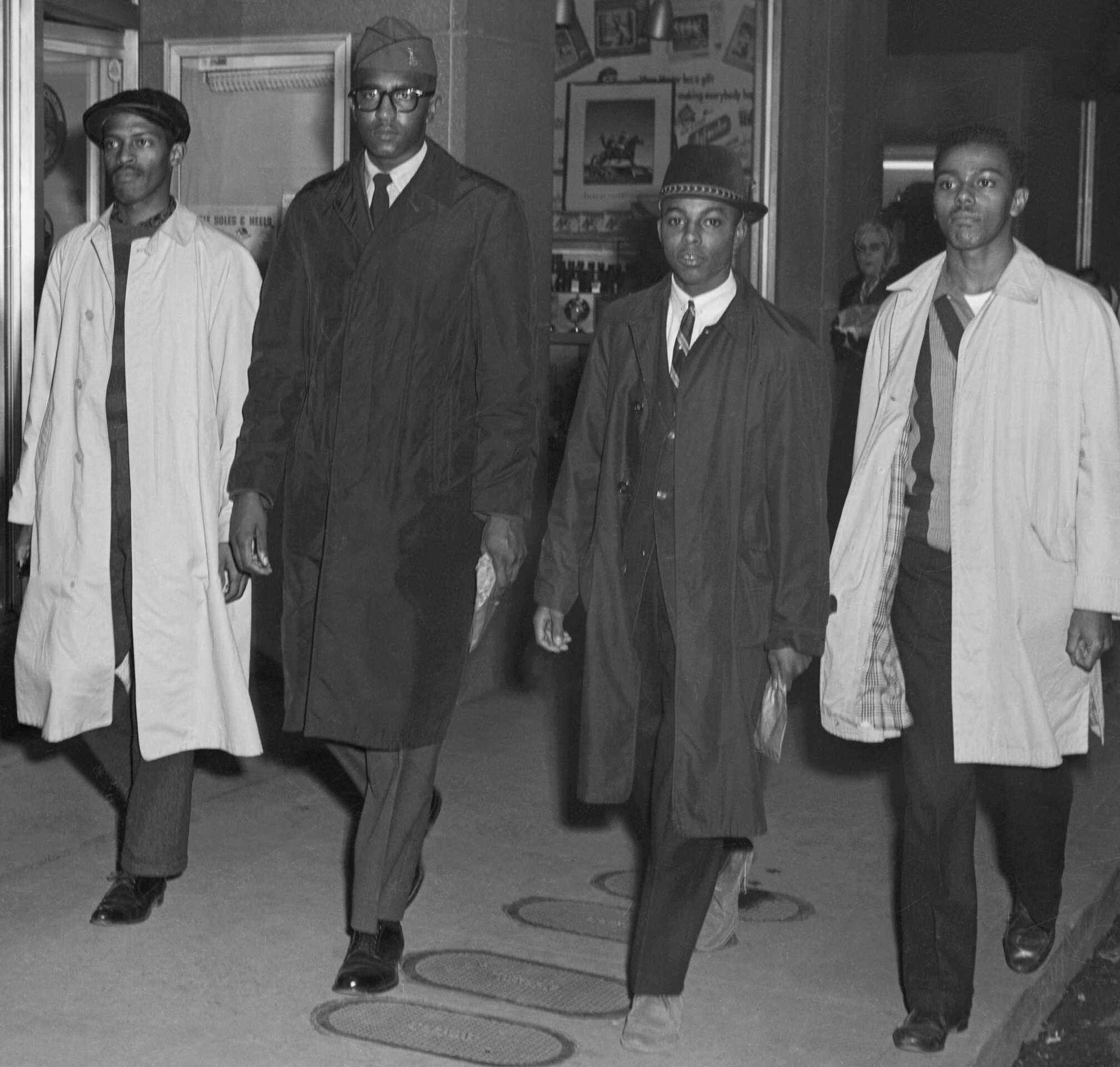
The sculpture is based upon the historic photograph of David Richmond, Franklin McCain, Ezell Blair, and Joseph McNeil exiting the downtown Greensboro Woolworth department store during protests of the chain's policy of racial segregation at its lunch counters.

February One was commissioned in 2001 by then university chancellor James C. Renick. The statue, which took its creator, James Barnhill, a year to complete, stands at 15 feet (4.6 m) tall. The four larger-than-life figures, which stand around 10 feet (3.0 m) tall, depict the likenesses of David Richmond, Franklin McCain, Jibreel Khazan (then known as Ezell Blair Jr.) and Joseph McNeil; the four A&T students who became known as the "Greensboro Four" for their sit-in at Woolworth's department store in 1960. The figures were created to illustrate the now historic image of the group walking out of Woolworth's after their protest. In an interview with the A&T Register, the University's newspaper, Barnhill stated that a stronger visual impact would be achieved by showing the four marching as opposed to sitting, and would better capture the essence of the men. The statue's base, which stands at 5 feet (1.5 m) tall, bears the names of each of the four men, and also, is inscribed on its front: "These four A&T Freshmen envisioned and carried out the lunch counter sit-in of February 1, 1960 in downtown Greensboro. Their courageous act against social injustice inspired similar progress across the nation and is remembered as a defining moment in the struggle for civil rights."

During the construction of the statue, Barnhill had to build four individual skeletal frames for each subject, in addition to, rolling stands for support. The frames were created by a combination of one-inch steel pipes and a diamond mesh material. Once the frames were covered with over 6,000 pounds of water-based clay, sectional molds had to be made, so that the figures could be sent to a foundry, where molds of the figures would be created.

== Dedication ==
On February 1, 2002, the statue was unveiled in a ceremony in front of the James B. Dudley Memorial Building on North Carolina A&T's campus. The ceremony was part of a day long celebration to honor the 42nd anniversary of the Greensboro Sit-Ins. The ceremony included remarks by university Chancellor, James C. Renick; provost, Carolyn Meyers; the statue's creator, James Barnhill; and Franklin McCain. The dedication ceremony was attended by all three surviving members of the Greensboro Four. David Richmond, who died in 1990, was represented by his son David "Chip" Richmond Jr.

== Significance ==
"It's a monument of four guys, not military members or presidents, These were just people...who became heroes."

— James Barnhill, February One creator
(on the inspiration and symbolism behind the sculpture)

The actions taken by the Greensboro Four were instrumental in increasing national sentiment for the fight for the civil rights of African-Americans during this period in American history. As media coverage of the protests increased, demonstrations spread throughout the Southern United States. Citizens in other southern cities began to protest not just for the desegregation of lunch counters, but also for equal service on other public accommodations such as: transport facilities; art galleries; beaches; parks; swimming pools; libraries; and even museums. Overall, the sit-ins were successful in achieving the desegregation of lunch counters and other public places throughout the south. In Nashville, Tennessee for instance, the sit-ins of the Nashville Student Movement had such an impact that public amenities were desegregated by May 1960.

== See also ==
- February One: The Story of the Greensboro Four (2003 documentary)
- Seizing Justice: The Greensboro 4 (2010 documentary)
- Civil rights movement in popular culture
