= Clarence Harris =

American store manager

Clarence Lee Harris
- Born: January 18, 1905; Raleigh, North Carolina, U.S.
- Died: July 14, 1999 (aged 94); Greensboro, North Carolina, U.S.

Clarence Lee "Curly" Harris (January 18, 1905 – July 14, 1999) was the store manager at the F. W. Woolworth Company store in Greensboro, North Carolina, during the Greensboro sit-ins in 1960.

== Early life ==
Harris was born in Raleigh, North Carolina. He grew up and attended high school in Durham, North Carolina. There, in 1923, he began his career at the F. W. Woolworth Company store as an assistant stock room manager. He continued working at Woolworth's after school and at night during his five and a half years at Trinity College, now Duke University, from which he graduated in 1928 with a major in accounting and business law.

== Career ==
From 1929 to 1933, Harris worked as assistant manager at the Durham Woolworth's. In 1933, he was transferred to the Harrisonburg, Virginia, store and promoted to store manager. He managed the Wilmington, North Carolina, store from 1937 to 1947, and the Raleigh store from 1947 to 1955, when he was transferred to the Greensboro, North Carolina store. He remained at the Greensboro store until his retirement in 1969.

== Greensboro sit-ins ==
On February 1, 1960, Joseph McNeil, Franklin McCain, Ezell Blair Jr. (later known as Jibreel Khazan), and David Richmond, four young African-American students from the North Carolina Agricultural and Technical State University (NC A&T), entered the downtown Greensboro Woolworth's (now the International Civil Rights Center and Museum) and sat at the "whites only" lunch counter. Although a Woolworth's waitress told them "we don't serve Negroes here," the four students refused to leave their seats for the rest of the day. During the following days and months the four students were joined by other students in their sit-in demonstration, Sit-in protests spread to other cities and were an important part of the Civil Rights Movement.

On Monday, July 25, 1960, after nearly $200,000 (~$1.58 million in 2023) in losses due to the demonstrations, store manager Harris quietly integrated the lunch counter when he asked four black employees of the store to change out of work clothes into street clothes and order a meal at the counter. These were the first black customers to be served at the store's lunch counter. The event received little publicity.
