= International Civil Rights Center and Museum =

Landmark in Greensboro, North Carolina

International Civil Rights Center & Museum

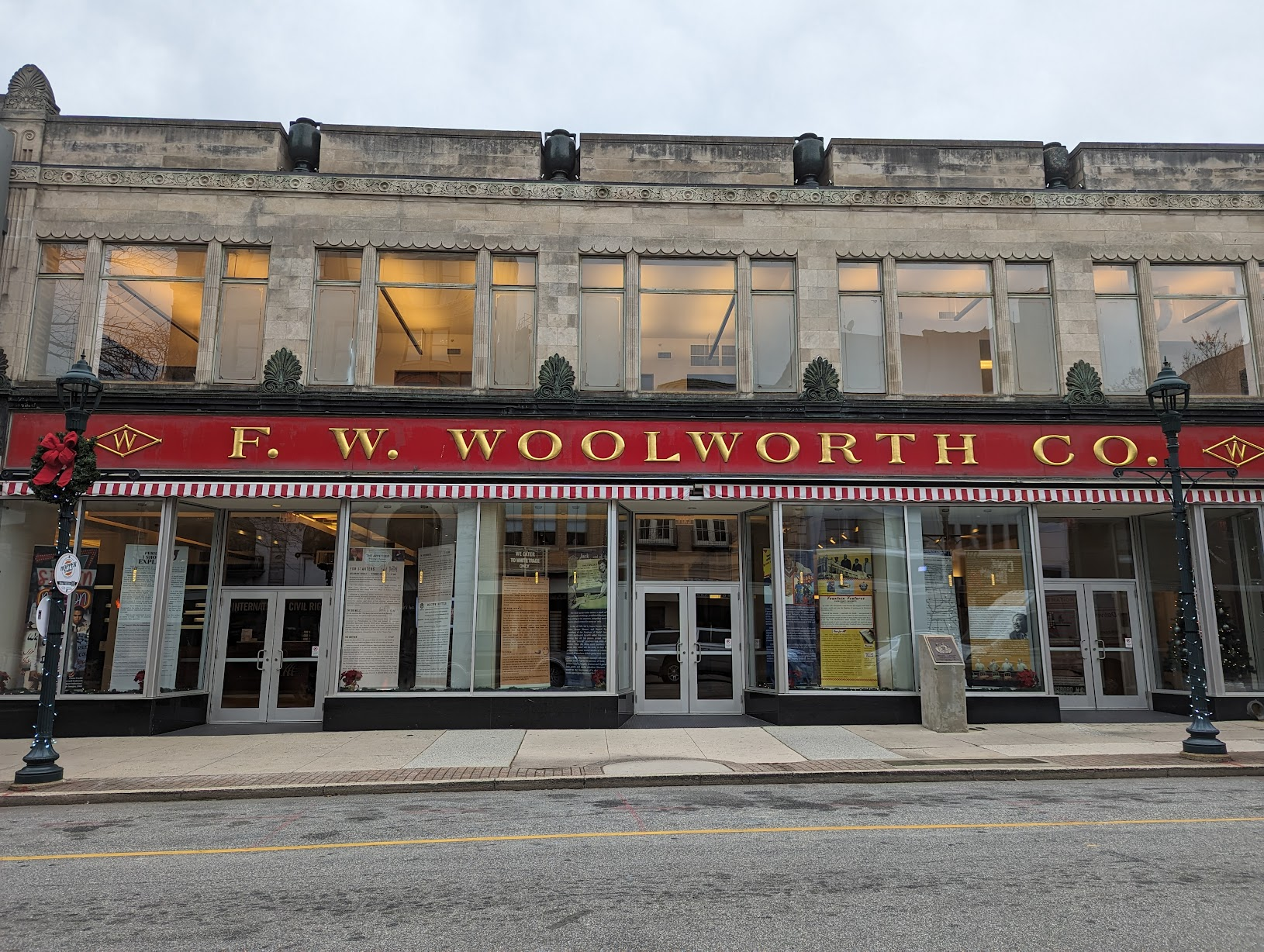
- Exterior of the museum, showing the original Woolworth's branding, in 2024

- Location in North Carolina
- Established: 2010
- Location: 134 S. Elm Street Greensboro, North Carolina
- Coordinates: 36.0717°N 79.7904°W
- Type: Civil and political rights
- Visitors: 70,000+/- annually
- Director: John Swaine
- Website: www.sitinmovement.org
- F. W. Woolworth Company Building
- U.S. National Register of Historic Places
- U.S. National Historic Landmark
- Location: 134 S. Elm Street, Greensboro, NC
- NRHP reference No.: 100011389
- Added to NRHP: 2024-12-13

The International Civil Rights Center & Museum (ICRCM) is located in Greensboro, North Carolina, United States. Its building formerly housed the Woolworth's, the site of a nonviolent protest in the civil rights movement and is now a National Historic Landmark, as well as a part of the Downtown Greensboro Historic District. Four students from North Carolina Agricultural and Technical State University (NC A&T) started the Greensboro sit-ins at a "whites only" lunch counter on February 1, 1960. The four students were Franklin McCain, Joseph McNeil, Ezell Blair Jr. (now Jibreel Khazan), and David Richmond. The next day there were twenty students. The aim of the museum's founders is to ensure that history remembers the actions of the A&T Four, those who joined them in the daily Woolworth's sit-ins, and others around the country who took part in sit-ins and in the civil rights movement. The Museum is currently supported by earned admissions and Museum Store revenues. The project also receives donations from private donors as a means of continuing its operations. The museum was founded in 1993 and officially opened its doors fifty years to the day after the sit-in movements in Greensboro NC.

== History ==
The building that now houses the museum was constructed in 1929 and was designed in the Art Deco style by local architect Charles C. Hartmann. It was initially known as the Whelan Building, after the Whelan Drug Company, which owned the building, operating a small drug store in one corner and leasing the rest as retail and office space. The F. W. Woolworth Company began leasing most of the building in 1939, as a replacement for a smaller location in downtown Greensboro. The store, advertised as "the largest and most modern Woolworth store in the south", and its 69-seat luncheonette opened to the public on August 10, 1939.

The store was the site of the Greensboro sit-ins, beginning on February 1, 1960, when four black students from North Carolina Agricultural and Technical State University sat at the segregated whites-only lunch counter and refused to leave until they were served. The ensuing sit-in movement grew in popularity, with thousands gathering at Greensboro's Woolworth and Kress stores, and similar protests at dozens of other segregated sites across the South. Facing boycotts and significant declines in sales, Woolworth manager Clarence Harris relented, desegregating the store on July 25, 1960. Many other businesses followed suit, and the Civil Rights Act of 1964 made such segregation illegal nationwide.

The lunch counter was remodeled around 1963, and its stools were removed during that time to be re-upholstered. When they were re-installed, there was no attempt to put them back in the same positions, making it impossible for later historians to determine which stools the Greensboro Four sat in on February 1.

While Woolworth was still an active business in the building, the site started to receive historical recognition. The portion of Sycamore Street in front of the building was renamed February One Place in a ceremony on February 1, 1990, the 30th anniversary of the first sit-in. The same year, the store donated a portion of the lunch counter to the Greensboro History Museum.

=== Saving the building ===
On October 14, 1993, Woolworth announced that it would close over 700 stores nationwide, including the downtown Greensboro location. A Woolworth spokesperson initially said that the company was interested in helping to preserve the building as a historic landmark. The lunch counter served its last meals on October 23, with the Rev. Jesse Jackson among hundreds who gathered there on the final day, singing "We Shall Overcome" minutes before the closure at 5 p.m. The store as a whole closed on January 22, 1994.

In November 1993, Guilford County commissioner Melvin "Skip" Alston proposed turning the building into an African-American historical museum. This was opposed by some of Alston's fellow commissioners, one of whom said that it would "even further deepen the crevices between the races". In December, Alston suggested a compromise, turning the building into a civil rights museum rather than one dedicated to African-American history more broadly. This second proposal was unanimously approved by the commission. Alston and Greensboro city councilman Earl Jones then co-founded Sit-In Movement, Inc., a nonprofit organization devoted to the purpose of creating a civil rights museum on the site. Days before the store closed in January 1994, First Citizens Bank, which owned the building, agreed to sell it to Sit-in Movement, Inc.

During the removal of store fixtures in February 1994, a section of the counter with four stools was removed for donation to the Smithsonian Institution's National Museum of American History.

The International Civil Rights Center and Museum was originally projected to open in 1996. Attorney and community archivist James P. Mayes was appointed as the executive director of Sit-in Movement, Inc., in May 1995, responsible for leading the fundraising of $10 million for the museum's construction. However, Mayes' contract was terminated in September, with Alston and Jones accusing him of failure to meet the project's fundraising goals. Mayes told the Greensboro News & Record that the organization was in "disarray", allegedly lacking basic financial record-keeping. The museum's ambitious fundraising goals faced substantial delays. By January 2000, $2 million had been raised out of a fundraising target of $9.1 million, and all but $70,000 of that money had been spent. Alston and Jones were accused by local leaders of mismanagement and egoism, particularly after creating the Alston-Jones International Civil Rights Award. The two co-owners claimed that their critics were engaging in racism.

In 2001, Sit-in Movement, Inc., and NC A&T announced a partnership to design and build the museum together.

=== Financial difficulties ===
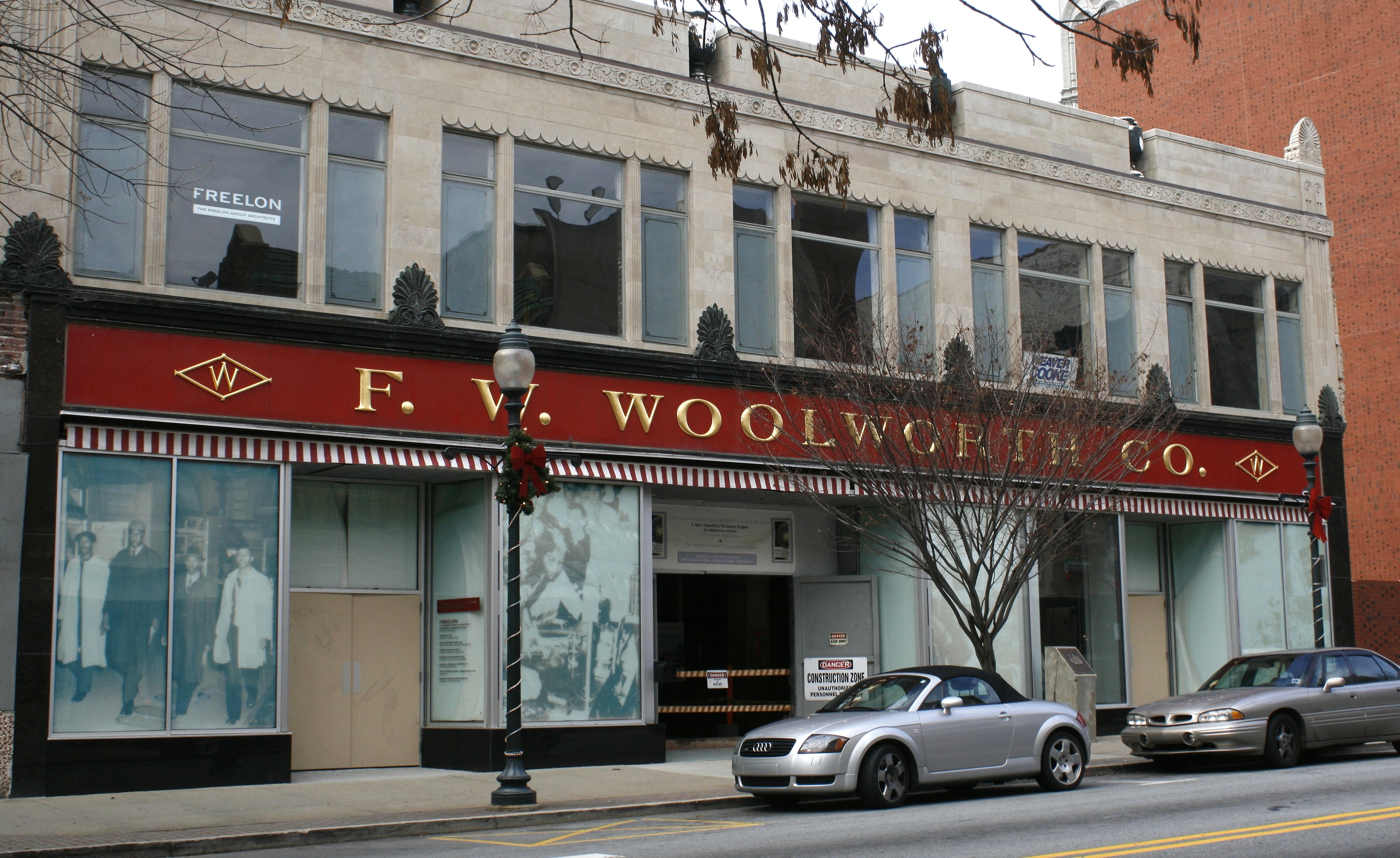
The building in 2008, before opening as the ICRCM

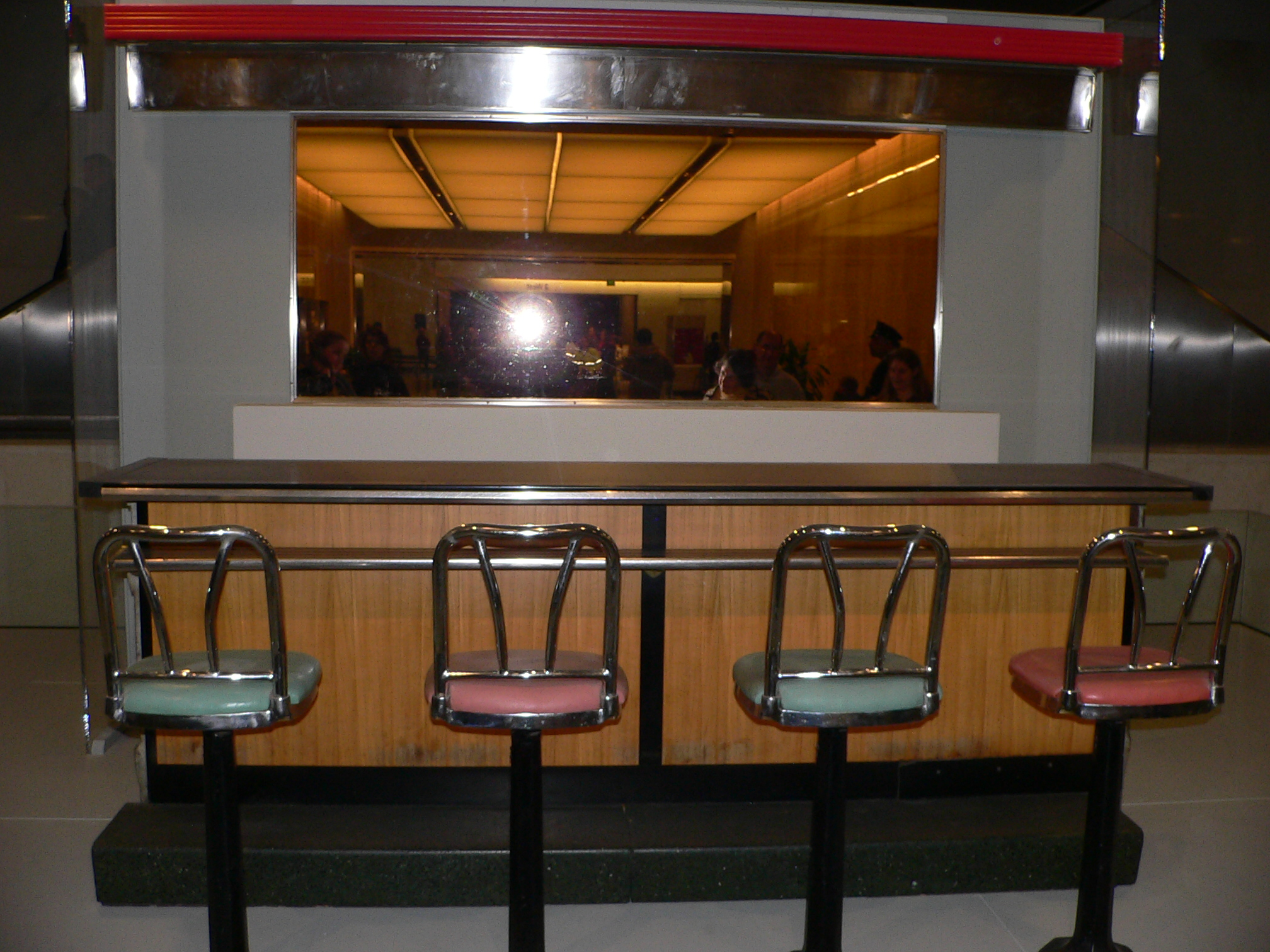
A section of the lunch counter now appears in the display of the Smithsonian Institution National Museum of American History.

The museum project suffered financial difficulties for several years despite millions of dollars in donations. These included more than $1 million from the State of North Carolina, a contribution from the Bryan Foundation, more than $200,000 each from the City of Greensboro and Guilford County, and $148,152 from the U.S. Department of Interior through the National Park Service Agency's Save America's Treasures program in 2005.

In fall 2007, Sit-in Movement, Inc. requested an additional $1.5 million (~$2.18 million in 2024) from the City of Greensboro; the request was rejected. Greensboro residents twice voted down bond referendums to provide money for the project.

In 2013, the city agreed to a $1.5 million loan, with the condition that an amount equal to money raised "outside the normal course of business" by the museum from September 2013 to July 2015 would be forgiven. A June 24, 2016 memo from City Manager Jim Westmoreland and Mayor Nancy Vaughn said the museum raised $612,510 and owed $933,155, with the first $145,000 payment due June 30, and the remainder by February 2018. The museum claimed it owed $281,805. On August 1, the city council voted not to forgive $800,000 of the debt; using the museum building as collateral was an option. Two weeks later, the city council gave the museum until February 2018 to raise more money, with an amount equal to money raised to be subtracted from the debt. After making a profit in 2016, the museum announced in 2018 its debt was retired.

=== Fundraising and opening ===
As the 50th anniversary of the sit-ins grew closer, efforts increased to complete the project. Over $9 million in donations and grants were raised. In addition, the museum qualified for historic preservation tax credits, which were sold for $14 million. Work on the project proceeded and was completed in time for the 50th-anniversary opening.

The ICRCM opened on February 1, 2010, on the 50th anniversary of the original sit-in, with a ribbon-cutting ceremony. A religious invocation was spoken by Rev. Jesse Jackson Jr. The three surviving members of the Greensboro Four (McCain, McNeil, and Khazan) were guests of honor. Assistant Attorney Thomas Perez represented the White House. Speakers included Perez, U.S. Senator Kay Hagan and N.C. Governor Beverly Perdue.

== Events ==
Since 2007 the museum organization has held an annual Black and White Ball. The 2010 theme was "Commemorating Five Decades of Civil Rights Activism." The 2011 theme was "Make a Change, Make a Difference." The 2013 theme was "Celebrating Our Victories as We Honor Our Past."

In September 2016, the presidential campaign of Donald Trump asked to allow the candidate to visit the museum during a planned campaign stop in North Carolina. The visit would have required the museum to close its doors to the public for five hours. The museum turned down Trump's request, with museum CEO John Swaine saying they did not want to suspend normal operations to help Trump "legitimize his ideological positions". After the decision was made public, supporters of Trump's campaign sent threats to the museum staff.

== Awards and recognition ==
The museum organization awards an Alston-Jones International Civil and Human Rights Award. The award is given to someone whose life's work has contributed to the expansion of civil and human rights. This is the museum's highest citation. The author Maya Angelou was the winner in 1998.

The 2013 Alston-Jones award was presented to Dr. Johnnetta Betsch Cole, director of the Smithsonian Institution's National Museum of African Art. Dr. Cole is a distinguished educator, cultural anthropologist and humanitarian. She is a former president of Bennett College and of Spelman College. The Museum gave Dr. Joe Dudley Sr., co-founder of Dudley Products, the 2013 Trailblazer Award. Gladys Shipman, proprietor of Shipman Family Care, received the 2013 Unsung Hero Award. For their courageous actions in the wake of the Feb. 1, 1960 sit-in protest, ICRCM gave Sit-In Participant Awards to Roslyn Cheagle of Lynchburg, Virginia; Raphael Glover of Charlotte, North Carolina; and Mary Lou Blakeney and Andrew Dennis McBride of High Point, North Carolina.

The museum has now been named a National Historic Landmark.

== Exhibits ==
The International Civil Rights Center and Museum was designed by Freelon Group of Durham, North Carolina, and exhibits were designed by Eisterhold Associates of Kansas City, Missouri. It has 30,000 square feet (2,800 m^{2}) of exhibit space occupying the ground floor and basement, and office space on the top floor.

Docent-led and self-guided tours are available for a fee. Tours begin in the lower level where visitors are introduced to the segregated society of the 1960s through video presentations and continues with a graphic "Hall of Shame" display of the violence against civil rights protesters of all colors throughout the United States. Visitors are introduced to the four students through a reenactment of the planning session set against the original furniture from their dorm room at A&T College in 1960. Visitors are led into the main floor of the museum where the massive lunch counter, in the original 1960 L-shaped configuration, occupies nearly the whole width and half the length of the building. Original signage from 1960 and dumbwaiters that delivered food from the upstairs kitchen are included, as is a reenactment of the sit-in on life-sized video screens. Visitors are then led through a reproduction of the "Colored Entrance" at the Greensboro Rail Depot where the roles of the church, schools, politics, and courts in the civil rights movement are explored. Artifacts include a pen used to sign the Voting Rights Act of 1965, the uniform of a Tuskegee Airman native to Greensboro, and a complete Ku Klux Klan robe and hood.

== Expansion plans ==
The museum set a goal of raising $5 million by March 31, 2022 toward the $10.25 million purchase price of an adjacent five-story building and 2.2 acres at 100 South Elm Street. The purchase would help the museum's chances of becoming a UNESCO World Heritage Site. The city council agreed to provide $1 million on March 23, along with $250,000 a year for four years, subject to a report on the building and raising additional funds. The grant would have to be paid back if the museum sold the building. On March 29 county commissioners approved $1 million, plus $200,000 a year for five years. Sit-in Movement Inc. made the purchase on March 31.

== See also ==
- List of Woolworth buildings
- Sit-in movement
- State v. Katz
- Timeline of the civil rights movement
