= Donald Anderson Edwards =

African American physicist

- Born: 5 January 1905; Calhoun, Alabama
- Died: 19 December 1999 (aged 94); Greensboro, North Carolina
- Education: Talladega College, BS; University of Chicago, MS; University of Pittsburgh, PhD
- Scientific career
- Fields: X-ray crystallography
- Workplaces: North Carolina A&T State University
- Thesis: The Structural Characteristics of Some Magnesium–Cadmium Alloys between 25 °C and 300 °C as Determined by X-ray Diffraction
- Notable students: Ronald McNair; Joseph McNeil

Donald Anderson Edwards (5 January 1905 – 19 December 1999) was an American physicist. Edwards was the founding chair of the physics department at North Carolina A&T State University, and spent his career teaching there and at other historically Black colleges and universities across the United States. His research was in the field of X-ray diffraction crystallography, and he was known for his 1931 determination of the complete crystal structure of potassium nitrate.

== Early life and education ==
Edwards was born on 5 January 1905 in Calhoun, Alabama. His father, Edward Early Edwards, was a minister and his mother, Mary Maud Edwards, was a schoolteacher.

He attended the Talladega College, a historically Black college, in Talladega, Alabama, for his undergraduate studies. Edwards graduated in 1926 with a bachelor's degree in mathematics and a minor in physics. In 1931 he graduated with a master's degree from the University of Chicago in physical sciences. At the time, the University of Chicago was a hub for Black academics while much of the rest of the higher education world remained segregated. In the first half of the 20th century, nine Black students earned undergraduate degrees, while five more earned graduate degrees, including Edwards.

== Career ==
After graduating with his master's degree, Edwards began his career teaching at a number of institutions, all of them historically Black colleges and universities.

He held appointments at Prairie View A&M University; Louisville Municipal College, a branch of the University of Louisville for Black students under segregation, which operated from 1931 to 1951 when the school desegregated; Virginia State University; and Lincoln University–Missouri, where he served as a physics professor and as chair of the physics department. In 1931, he successfully completed the crystal structure of potassium nitrate.

While teaching at Lincoln University–Missouri, Edwards returned to university to complete his doctorate degree. After not being admitted to schools in the South due to racial segregation, in 1948 he enrolled at the University of Pittsburgh, and completed his PhD in physics in 1951. His thesis was titled "The Structural Characteristics of Some Magnesium–Cadmium Alloys between 25 °C and 300 °C as Determined by X-ray Diffraction."

In addition to his teaching appointments and doctoral research at the University of Pittsburgh, Edwards also conducted research at the Oak Ridge National Laboratory, and the U.S. Naval Ordnance Laboratory. His research many focused in the field of X-ray crystallography.

In 1953, Edwards became professor and founding chair of the physics department at North Carolina A&T State University in Greensboro, North Carolina, which he chaired until 1971. As part of his work as founding chair, he is crediting with establishing the physics curriculum for North Carolina A&T.

Among his physics students at North Carolina A&T were retired major general and member of the Greensboro Four, Joseph McNeil; civil rights activist and another member of the Greensboro Four, David Richmond; and NASA astronaut and physicist Ronald McNair, who was the second African American person to go to space and who was killed in the 1986 Space Shuttle Challenger tragedy. McNair frequently credited Edwards for encouraging him to pursue a PhD in physics, and for his support in the astronaut selection process.

In the spring of 1972, an events banquet organized by prominent African-American physicists was formed, and took the title Day of Scientific Lectures and Seminars (DOSLAS). Their first meeting was held in December 1972 at Fisk University in Nashville, Tennessee, to honor Edwards, Dr. John McNeile Hunter, and Dr. Halson V. Eagleson. In 1973, Edwards, Hunter and Eagleson were credited with having taught 90% of the Black physicists in the country at that point.

These meetings would become the impetus for the formation of the Society of Black Physicists in 1977, which was later renamed the National Society of Black Physicists (NSBP). In 2020, the American Physical Society designated Morgan State University, in Baltimore, Maryland, where the first official meetings of the NSBP were held, as a new historic site.

== Personal life ==
Donald Edwards was married to Ruth Edwards for 65 years. They had one daughter.

== Awards and legacy ==
Edwards was one of the first three individuals to receive a citation from the American Physical Society in recognition of his contributions to the physics community and work making physics education available to Black students.

He is also the namesake of the Donald A. Edwards Endowed Scholarship for physics students at North Carolina A&T. In 2015, the university hosted a conference in honor of Edwards with the National Society of Black Physicists and the National Conference of Black Physics Students for the groups' annual meeting. Students presented papers on X-ray crystallography in honor of Edwards' research.

== Select publications ==
- "Magnesium-Cadmium Alloys. IV. The Cadmium-Rich Alloys; Some Lattice Parameters and Phase Relationships between 25 and 300°. Structure of the MgCd3 Superlattice. Schottky Defects and the Anomalous Entropy1," Journal of the American Chemical Society, 1952 (with William E. Wallace and R. S. Craig)
