= February One: The Story of the Greensboro Four =

- Directed by: Rebecca Cerese; Steven Channing
- Release date: 2003
- Country: United States
- Language: English

February One: The Story of the Greensboro Four is a 2003 documentary film by Rebecca Cerese and Steven Channing. Nationally broadcast on Independent Lens on PBS, it tells the story of The Greensboro Four, four young college freshman, Joseph McNeil, David Richmond, Franklin McCain and Ezell Blair, Jr. (now Jibreel Khazan), who staged a sit-in at Woolworth's in 1960 to protest segregation practices. Based largely on first hand accounts and rare archival footage, the documentary film February One documents one volatile winter in Greensboro that not only challenged public accommodation customs and laws in North Carolina, but served as one of the blueprints for the nonviolent protests that occurred across the South and the nation during the Civil Rights Movement in the 1960s.

It won an award of excellence at the Global Peace Film Festival in 2004, Best Documentary Film at the Carolina Film and Video Festival, and the Human Rights Award at the RiverRun Film Festival. The documentary has also played at the King Center in Atlanta, the Smithsonian National Museum of American History, and the National Archives in Washington, DC among other places.

== See also ==
- Civil rights movement in popular culture
- February One monument and sculpture
- Sit-in movement
