= Greensboro sit-ins =

1960 nonviolent protests in the United States

- Part of the sit-in movement in the civil rights movement
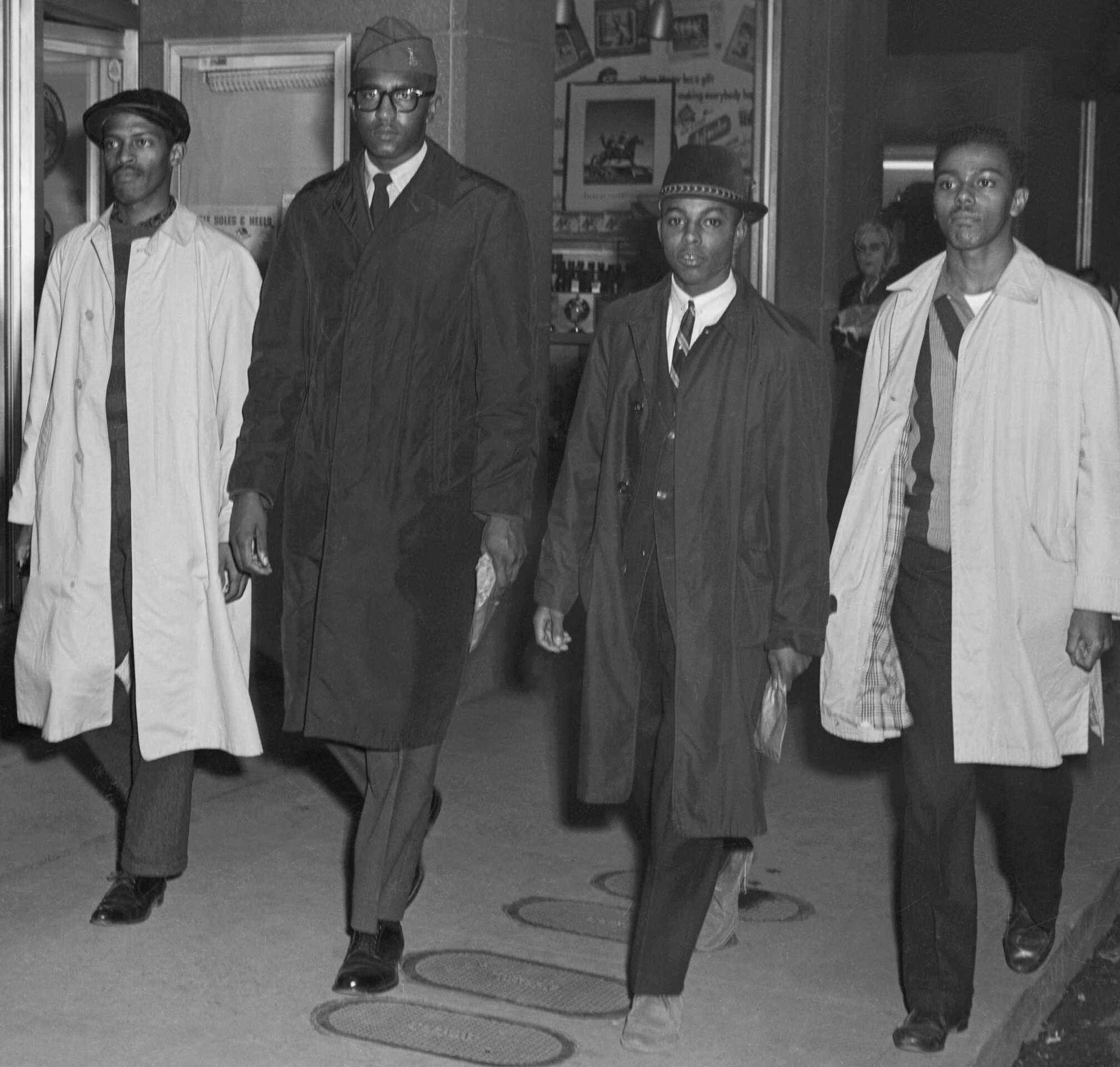
- The "Greensboro Four:" (left to right) David Richmond, Franklin McCain, Ezell A. Blair, Jr., and Joseph McNeil. Photo by Jack Moebes, News & Record
- Date: February 1 – July 25, 1960 (5 months, 3 weeks and 3 days)
- Location: Greensboro, North Carolina
- Caused by: "Whites Only" lunch counters at F. W. Woolworth Company; Racial segregation in public accommodations
- Result: Catalyst to sit-in movement that spread to more than 55 cities in 13 U.S. states within three months; Formation of Student Executive Committee for Justice (SECJ); Greensboro businesses desegregate lunch counters; Catalyst to the formation of the Student Nonviolent Coordinating Committee (SNCC)

Parties
Students from: North Carolina Agricultural and Technical State University; Bennett College; James B. Dudley High School; Woman's College; Organizations involved: Congress of Racial Equality (CORE)	Business lunch counters at: F. W. Woolworth Company; Kress; Walgreens; Organizations involved: KKK

Lead figures
Students: Joseph McNeil; Franklin McCain; Ezell Blair Jr.; David Richmond	Woolworth: Clarence Harris; KKK member: George Dorsett

The Greensboro sit-ins were a series of nonviolent protests in February to July 1960, primarily in the Woolworth store—now the International Civil Rights Center and Museum—in Greensboro, North Carolina, which led to the F. W. Woolworth Company department store chain removing its policy of racial segregation in the Southern United States. While not the first sit-in of the civil rights movement, the Greensboro sit-ins were an instrumental action, and also the best-known sit-ins of the civil rights movement. They are considered a catalyst to the subsequent sit-in movement, in which 70,000 people participated. This sit-in was a contributing factor in the formation of the Student Nonviolent Coordinating Committee (SNCC).

== Previous sit-ins ==
In August 1939, African-American attorney Samuel Wilbert Tucker organized the Alexandria Library sit-in in Virginia (now the Alexandria Black History Museum). In 1942, the Congress of Racial Equality sponsored sit-ins in Chicago, as they did in St. Louis in 1949 and Baltimore in 1952. College students led a successful 1955 sit-in at Read's Drug Store in Baltimore, but the event received less widespread attention than the Greensboro sit-ins. The Dockum Drug Store sit-in in 1958 in Wichita, Kansas, was successful in ending segregation at every Dockum Drug Store in Kansas and the Katz Drug Store sit-in in Oklahoma City the same year led the Katz Drug Stores to end its segregation policy. Like the Greensboro sit-ins, the participants in the two 1958 sit-ins employed a similar strategy and sought to desegregate store lunch counters. Between 1958 and 1964, Oklahoma City would serve as a hotspot for sit-ins.

== Activists' plan ==
The Greensboro Four (as they would soon be known) were Joseph McNeil, Franklin McCain, Ezell Blair Jr., and David Richmond, all young black students at North Carolina Agricultural and Technical State University in their freshman year who often met in their dorm rooms to discuss what they could do to stand against segregation. They were inspired by Martin Luther King Jr. and his practice of nonviolent protest, and specifically wanted to change the segregational policies of F. W. Woolworth Company in Greensboro, North Carolina. During Christmas vacation of 1959, McNeil attempted to buy a hot dog at the Greensboro Greyhound Lines bus station, but was refused service. Shortly thereafter, the four men decided that it was time to take action against segregation. They came up with a simple plan: they would occupy seats at the local F. W. Woolworth Company store, ask to be served, and when they were inevitably denied service, they would not leave. They would repeat this process every day for as long as it would take. Their goal was to attract widespread media attention to the issue, forcing Woolworth to implement desegregation.

== The sit-ins ==
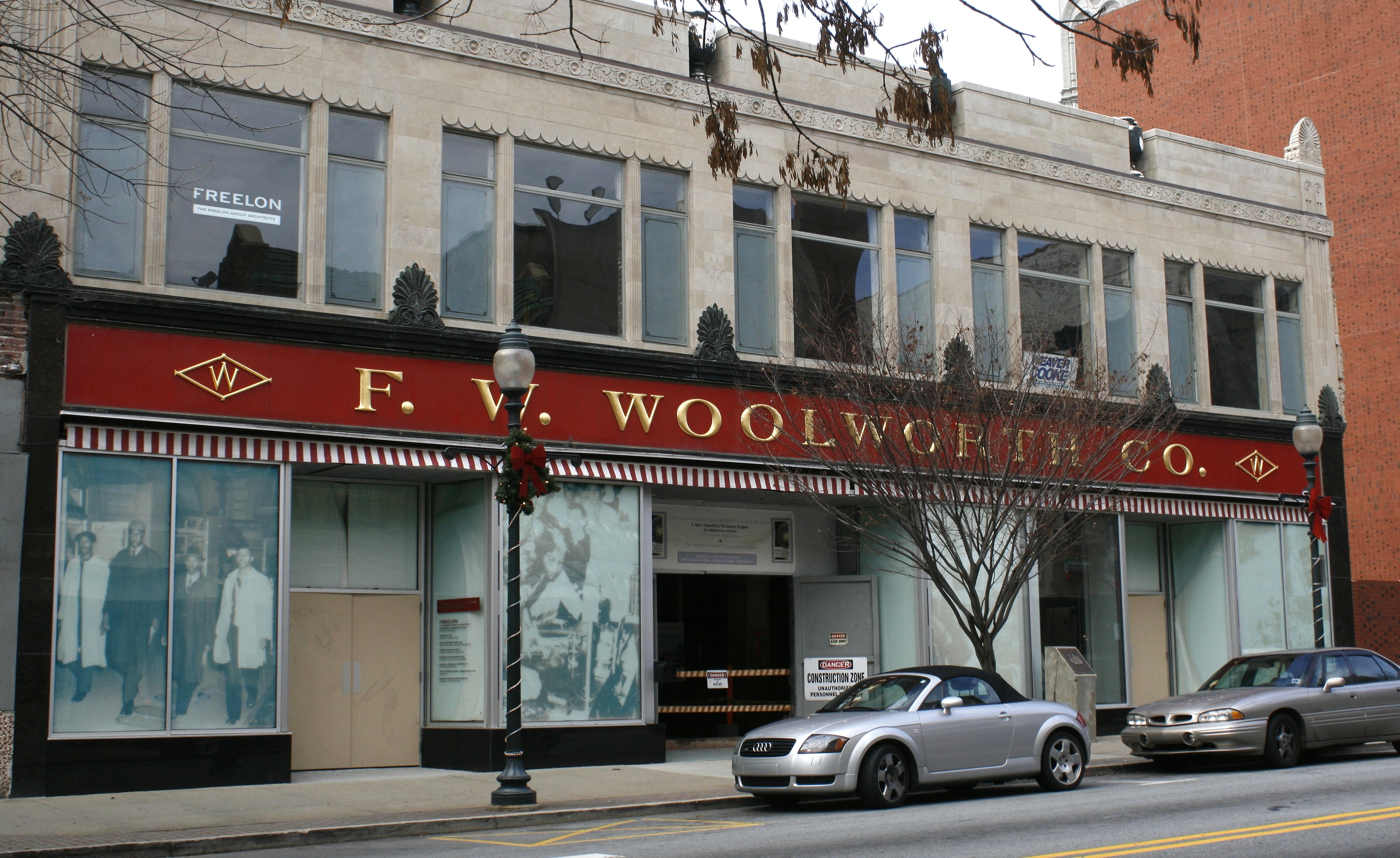
The event took place at this Woolworth five-and-dime store.

On February 1, 1960, at 4:30 pm ET, the four sat down at the 66-seat L-shaped stainless steel lunch counter inside the F. W. Woolworth Company store at 132 South Elm Street in Greensboro, North Carolina. The men, Ezell Blair Jr., David Richmond, Franklin McCain and Joseph McNeil, who would become known as the A&T Four or the Greensboro Four, had purchased toothpaste and other products from a non-segregated counter in the store with no problems, but were then refused service at the store's lunch counter when they each asked for a cup of coffee and a donut with cream on the side. According to a witness, a white waitress told the young men, "We don't serve Negroes here". Blair responded that he had just been served two feet away, to which the waitress replied, "Negroes eat at the other end".

An African-American girl who was cleaning behind the counter called them "stupid, ignorant, rabble-rousers, troublemakers". Another African-American told them, "You're just hurting race relations by sitting there". However, an elderly white woman told them, "I am just so proud of you. My only regret is that you didn't do this ten or fifteen years ago". Store manager Clarence Harris asked them to leave, and, when they would not budge, called his supervisor, who told him, "They'll soon give up, leave and be forgotten". Harris allowed the students to stay and did not call police to evict them. The four freshmen stayed until the store closed that night, and then went back to the North Carolina A&T University campus, where they recruited more students to join them the next morning.

The next day, on February 2, 1960, Joseph A. McNeil and Franklin E. McCain were joined by William Smith and Clarence Henderson at the Woolworth lunch counter. Eventually, more than twenty black students (including four women), recruited from other campus groups, joined the sit-in. This group sat with school work to stay busy from 11 a.m. to 3 p.m. The group was again refused service, and was harassed by white customers at the store. However, the sit-in protest made local news on the second day, with reporters, a TV cameraman and police officers present throughout the day. Upon hearing of the sit-ins, university president Warmoth T. Gibbs remarked that Woolworth's "did not have the reputation for fine food".

Back on campus that night, the Student Executive Committee for Justice was organized, and wrote a letter to the president of F. W. Woolworth asking him to "take a firm stand to eliminate discrimination".

We the undersigned are students at the Negro college in the city of Greensboro. Time and time again we have gone into Woolworth stores in Greensboro. We have bought thousands of items at the hundreds of counters in your stores. Our money was accepted without rancor or discrimination, and with politeness towards us, when at a long counter just three feet away our money is not acceptable because of the color of our skins.... We are asking your company to take a firm stand to eliminate discrimination. We firmly believe that God will give you courage and guidance in solving the problem. Sincerely Yours, Student Executive Committee.

On February 3, 1960, the number grew to over 60, including students from Dudley High School. An estimated one third of the protesters were women, many of them students from Bennett College, a historically black women's college in Greensboro. White customers heckled the black students, who read books and studied, while the lunch counter staff continued to refuse service. North Carolina's official chaplain of the Ku Klux Klan (Kludd), George Dorsett, as well as other members of the Klan, were present. The F. W. Woolworth national headquarters said that the company would "abide by local custom" and maintain its segregation policy.

On February 4, 1960, more than 300 people took part. The group now included students from North Carolina A&T University, Bennett College, and Dudley High School, and they filled the entire seating area at the lunch counter. Three white female students from the Woman's College of the University of North Carolina (now University of North Carolina at Greensboro), Genie Seaman, Marilyn Lott, and Ann Dearsley, also joined the protest. Organizers agreed to expand the sit-in protests to include the lunch counter at Greensboro's S. H. Kress & Co. store that day. Students, college administrators, and representatives from F. W. Woolworth and Kress met to discuss, but with the stores' refusal to integrate, the meeting was not resolved.

On February 5, 1960, a high tension environment at the Woolworth counter emerged when 50 white men sat at the counter, in opposition to the protesters, which now included white college students. Again, more than 300 were at the store by 3:00 pm, at which time the police removed two young white customers for swearing and yelling, and then police arrested three white patrons before the store closed at 5:30 pm. Another meeting between students, college officials, and store representatives took place, and again there was no resolution. The store representatives were frustrated that only certain segregated stores were being protested, and asked for intervention by the college administrators, while some administrators suggested a temporary closure of the counters.

On Saturday, February 6, 1960, over 1,400 North Carolina A&T students met in the Richard B. Harrison Auditorium on campus. They voted to continue the protests and went to the Woolworth store, filling up the store. More than 1,000 protesters and counter-protesters packed themselves into the store by noon. Around 1 pm, a bomb threat set for 1:30 pm was delivered by call to the store, causing the protesters to head to the Kress store, which immediately closed, along with the Woolworth store.

On March 16, 1960, President Dwight D. Eisenhower expressed his concern for those who were fighting for their human and civil rights, saying that he was "deeply sympathetic with the efforts of any group to enjoy the rights of equality that they are guaranteed by the Constitution".

In response to these protests, the Mayor of Greensboro created the Mayor's Committee on Community Relations to try to ease tensions between groups. Businesses in Greensboro refused to negotiate desegregation. Following the committee's announced failure on April 1, black students began picketing, causing storeowners to close down lunch counters. They continued to picket, as did those in favor of segregation. 19 days later, 45 black students were arrested for trespassing after returning to the closed Kress's lunch counter.

The sit-in movement then spread to other Southern cities, including Winston-Salem, Durham, Raleigh, Charlotte, Richmond, Virginia, and Lexington, Kentucky. In Nashville, Tennessee, students of the Nashville Student Movement were trained by civil rights activist James Lawson and started their sit-ins shortly after those in Greensboro began. The Nashville sit-ins attained desegregation of the downtown department store lunch counters in May 1960. Most of these protests were peaceful, but there were instances of violence. In Chattanooga, Tennessee, tensions rose between blacks and whites and fights broke out. In Jackson, Mississippi, students from Tougaloo College staged a sit-in on May 28, 1960, recounted in the autobiography of Anne Moody, a participant. In Coming of Age in Mississippi, Moody describes their treatment from whites who were at the counter when they sat down, the formation of the mob in the store and how they managed finally to leave. The sit-ins spread to other forms of public accommodation, including transport facilities, swimming pools, lunch counters, libraries, art galleries, parks, beaches, and museums, primarily in the South.

As the sit-ins continued, tensions began to grow in Greensboro. Students began a far-reaching boycott of stores with segregated lunch counters. Sales at the boycotted stores dropped by a third, leading their owners to abandon segregation policies. On Monday, July 25, 1960, after nearly $200,000 in losses ($2.2 million in 2025 dollars), and a reduction in salary for not meeting sales goals, store manager Clarence Harris asked four black employees, Geneva Tisdale, Susie Morrison, Anetha Jones, and Charles Bess, to change out of their work clothes and order a meal at the counter. They were, quietly, the first to be served at a Woolworth lunch counter. Most stores were soon desegregated, though in Jackson, Tennessee, Woolworth's continued to be segregated until around 1965, despite multiple protests. When Woolworth's and its lunch counter closed in 1993, Geneva Tisdale was still working there and was the last remaining store employee who had been present on February 1, 1960.

The Civil Rights Act of 1964 mandated desegregation in public accommodations.

== Lunch counter on display ==
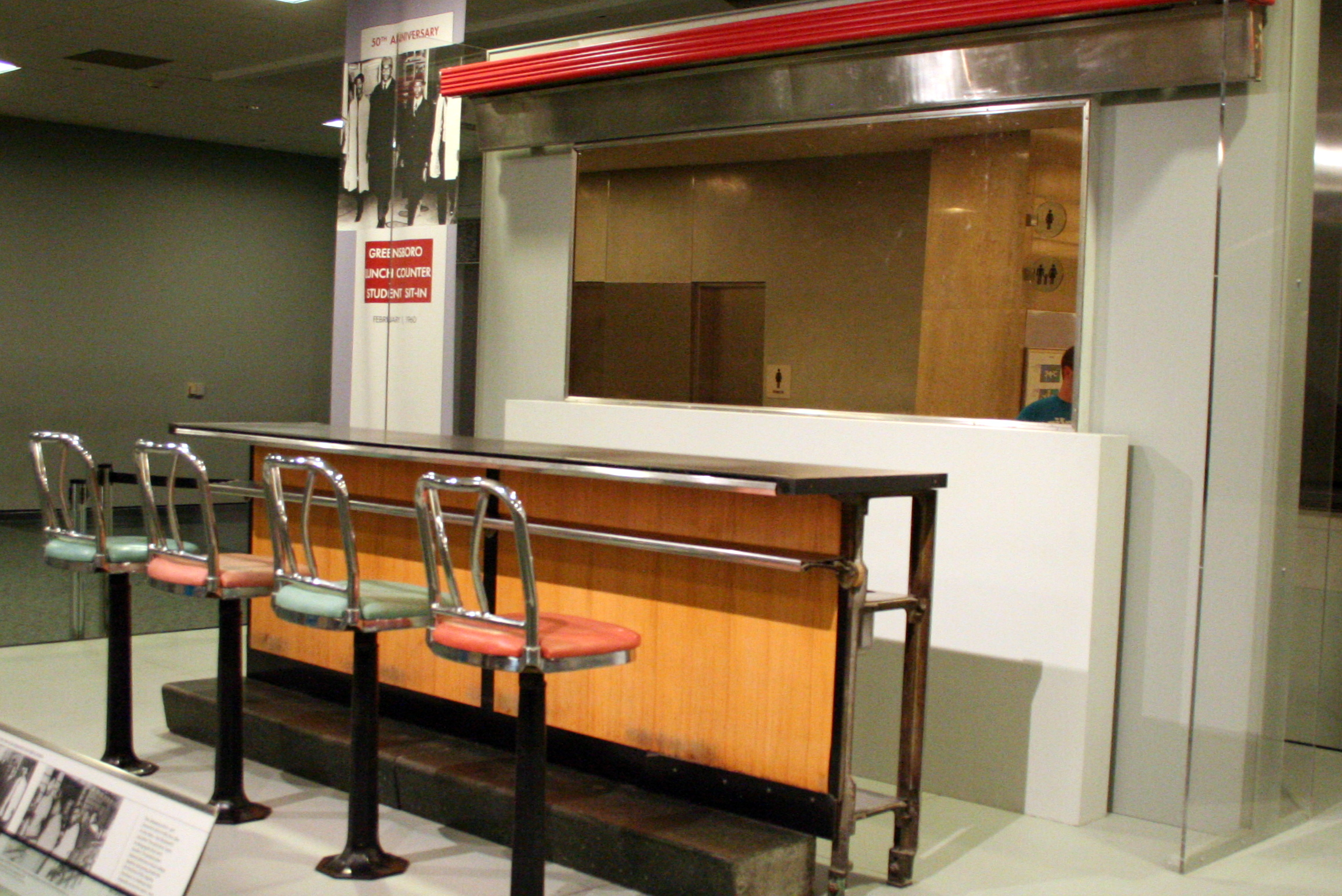
Lunch counter from the F. W. Woolworth

The International Civil Rights Center & Museum in Greensboro has portions of the lunch counter, and donated part of their lunch counter to the Smithsonian's African American Museum National Museum of African American History and Culture in 2016.

A four-seat portion of the lunch counter acquired by the Smithsonian Institution in 1993, is displayed in the National Museum of American History and a six-seat portion was donated to the Greensboro History Museum in 1993 and is on display.

== Commemorations ==
In 1990, the street south of the site was renamed February One Place, in commemoration of the date of the first Greensboro sit-in.

In 2002, the February One monument and sculpture by James Barnhill, depicting the Greensboro Four, was erected on North Carolina Agricultural and Technical State University's campus.

On February 1, 2020, Google showed a Google Doodle of a diorama made by Karen Collins to commemorate the 60th anniversary of the Greensboro sit-in.

On April 12, 2022, the Guilford County Board of Education voted to rename The Middle College at N.C. A&T, a high school for boys on the N.C. A&T campus, "A&T Four Middle College at North Carolina A&T State University" effective July 1, 2022.

== In film ==
- February One: The Story of the Greensboro Four is a 2003 documentary film shown on PBS.
- Seizing Justice: The Greensboro 4 is a 2010 documentary film for the Smithsonian Channel.

== See also ==
- Chapel Hill Nine
- Timeline of the civil rights movement
