= Lunch counter =

Particular type of casual restaurant

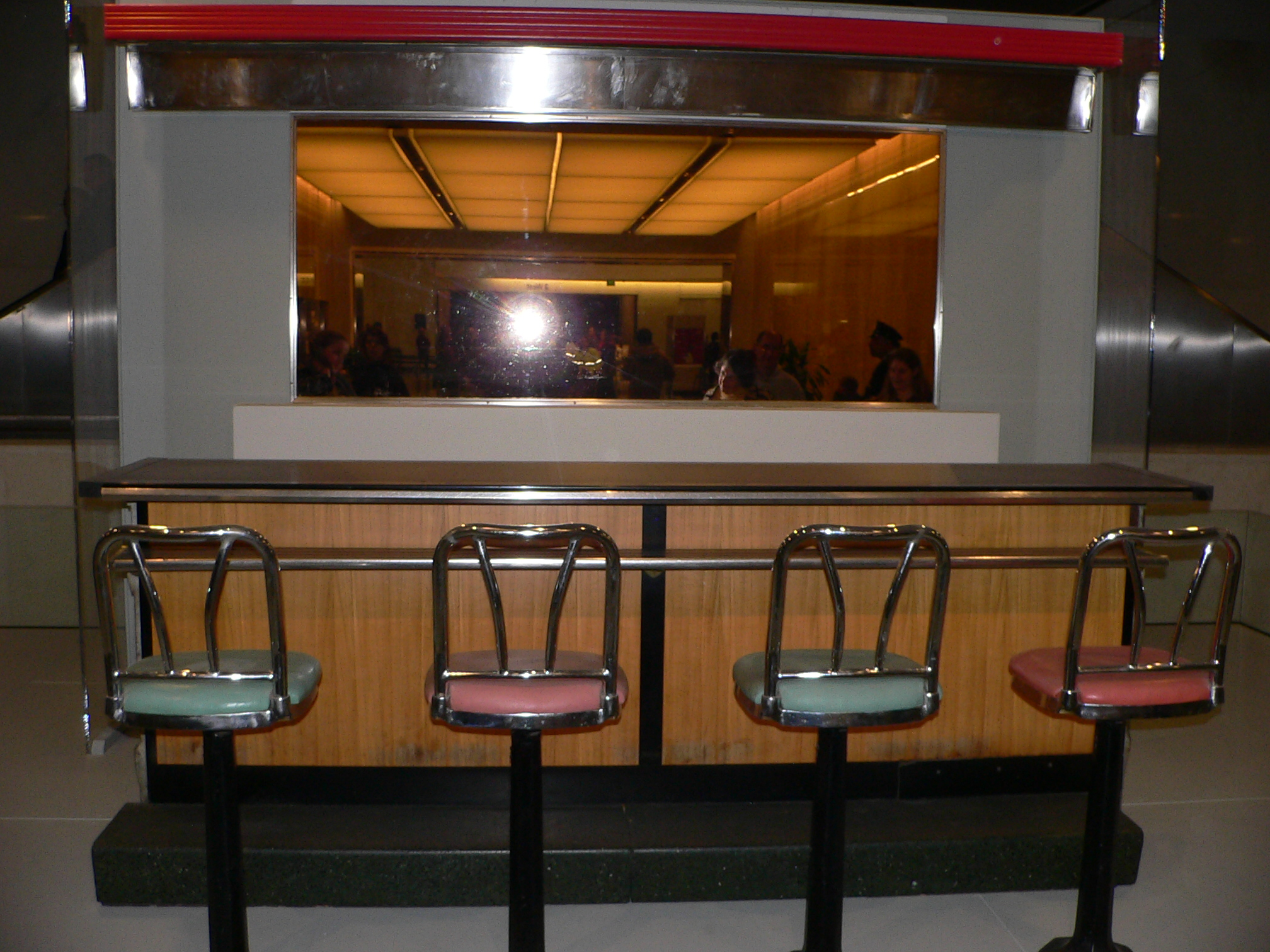
A section of the standard wood, stainless steel, and chrome lunch counter from the Woolworth's five and dime in Greensboro, North Carolina. This particular lunch counter is preserved in the National Museum of American History, having been the site of the 1960 Greensboro sit-ins against racial segregation and Jim Crow laws.

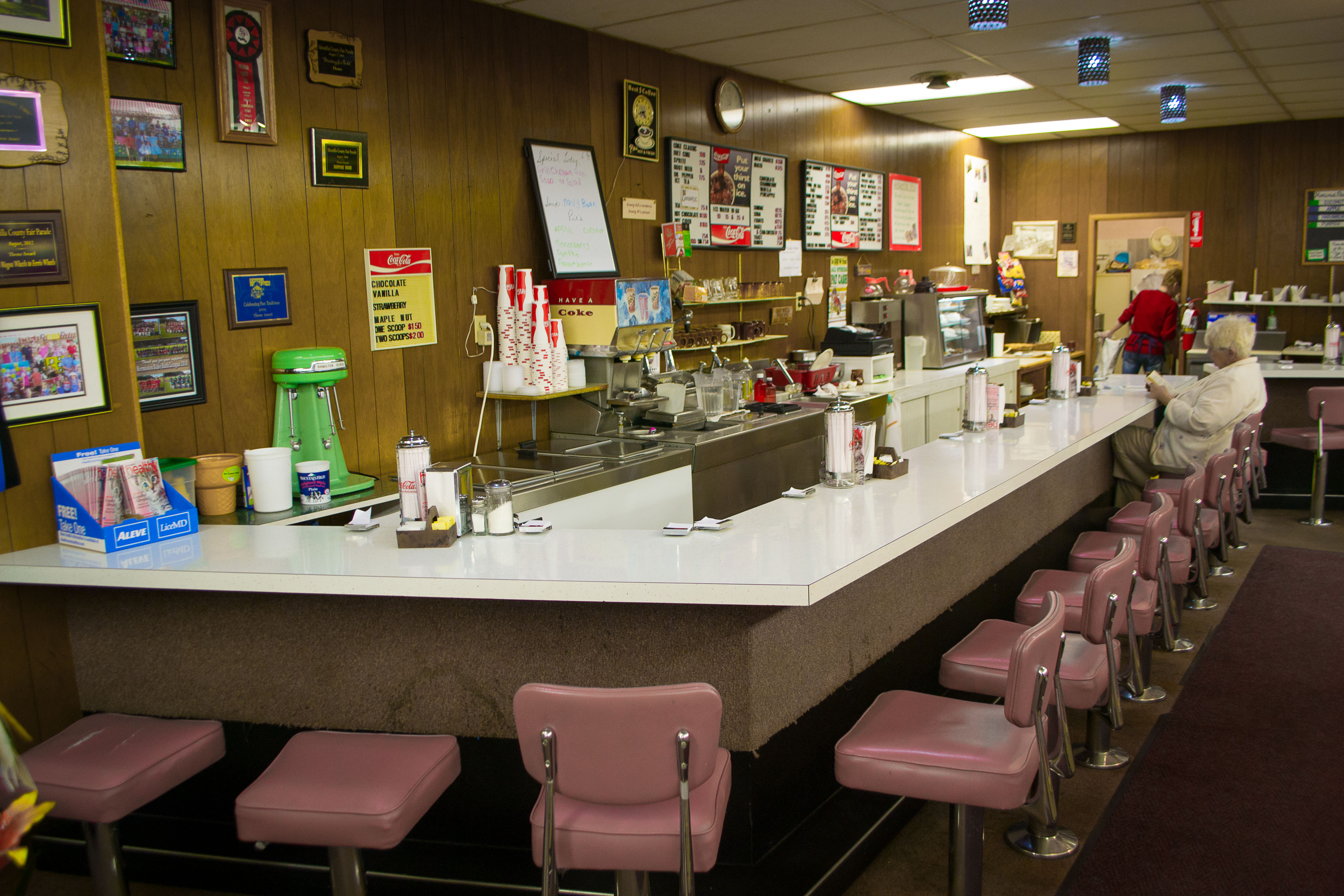
A drugstore lunch counter in Hermiston, Oregon

A lunch counter or luncheonette is a small restaurant, similar to a diner, where the patron sits on a stool on one side of the counter and the server serves food from the opposite side of the counter, where the kitchen or food preparation area is located. As the name suggests, they were primarily used for the lunch meal. Lunch counters were once commonly located inside variety stores (also known as "five and dimes", "five and tens", or "dimestores"), pharmacies, and department stores in the United States throughout the 20th century. The intent of the lunch counter in a store was to profit from serving hungry shoppers, and to attract people to the store so that they might buy merchandise.

== History ==
Woolworth's, an early five and dime store chain, opened their first luncheonette in New Albany, Indiana, around 1923, and expanded rapidly from there. Lunch counters were often found in other dimestores, like Newberry's, S. H. Kress, H.L. Green, W.T. Grant, McLellan's or McCrory's. Members of the retail staff who had taken lunch counter training would staff the counter during lunch time. A lunch counter was built into dime-stores as late as the 1950s. However, into the 1960s, they lost popularity to fast food restaurants, such as McDonald's, and convenience stores, such as 7-Eleven.

Typical foods served were hot and cold sandwiches (such as ham and cheese, grilled cheese, BLT, patty melt, and egg salad), soups, pie, ice cream (including sundaes, ice cream sodas, and milkshakes), soda, coffee, and hot chocolate.

== Civil rights movement ==
Integrating lunch counters in the Southern United States through the use of sit-in political protests in the 1960s was a major accomplishment of the civil rights movement. These involved African Americans and their supporters sitting at the lunch counter in areas designated for "whites only", insisting that they be served food and beverages. The Woolworth's lunch counter in Greensboro, North Carolina, was the site of one of the first such sit-ins in 1960. In recognition of its significance, part of the Greensboro lunch counter has been installed at the Smithsonian Institution's National Museum of American History, while the former Woolworth's building is now the site of International Civil Rights Center and Museum.

== Gallery ==
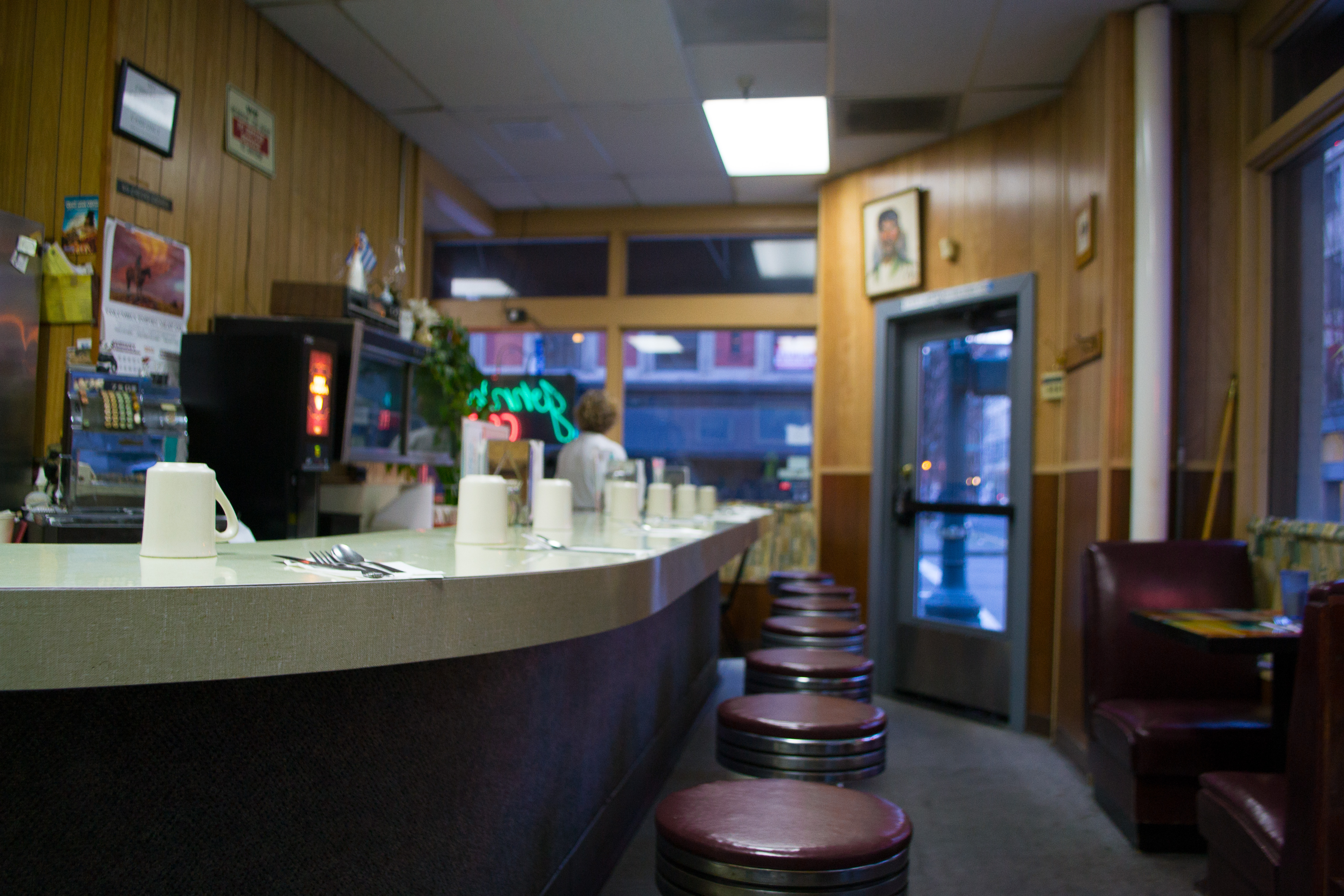
John's Cafe in Portland, Oregon

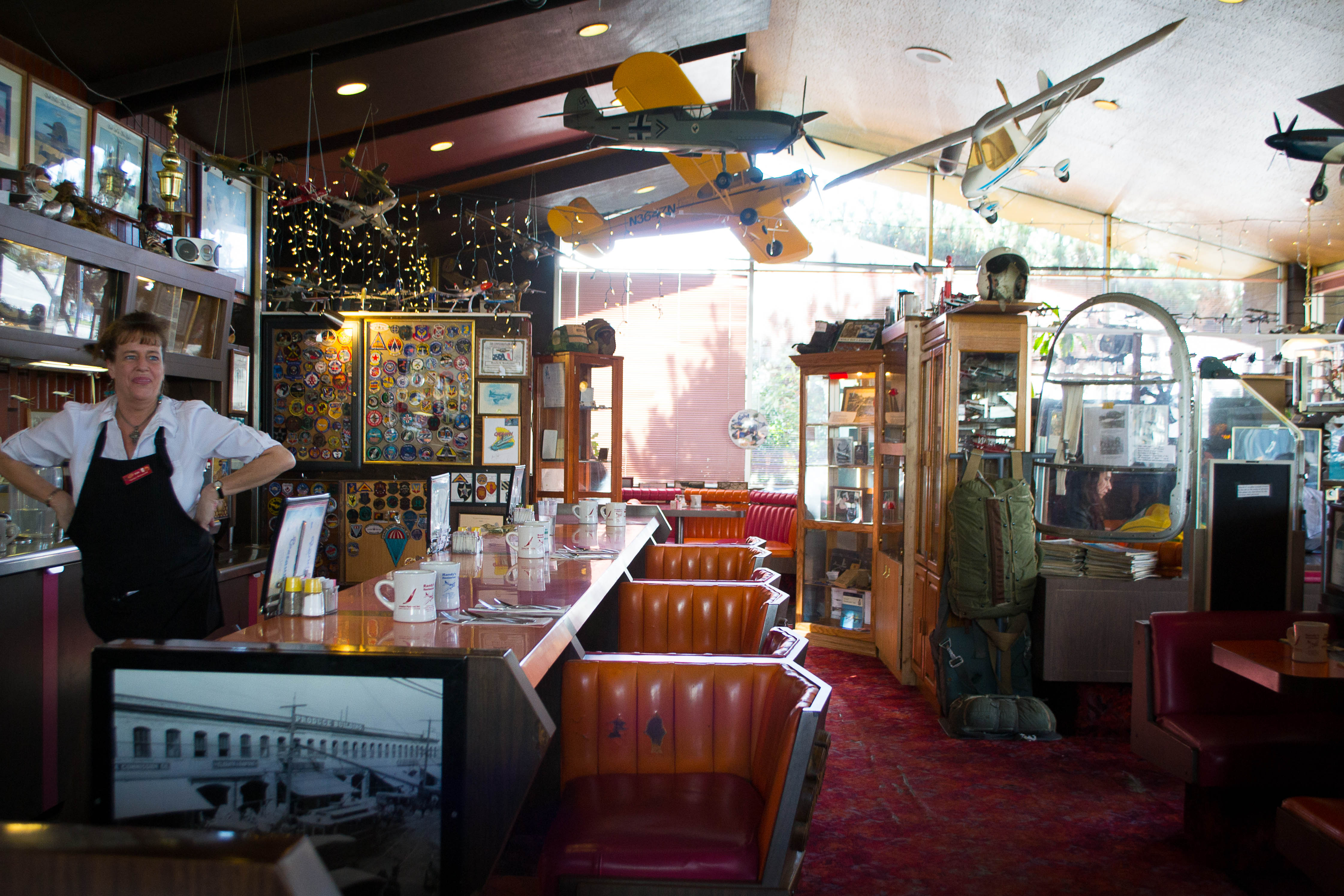
Randy's Restaurant counter in Seattle, Washington

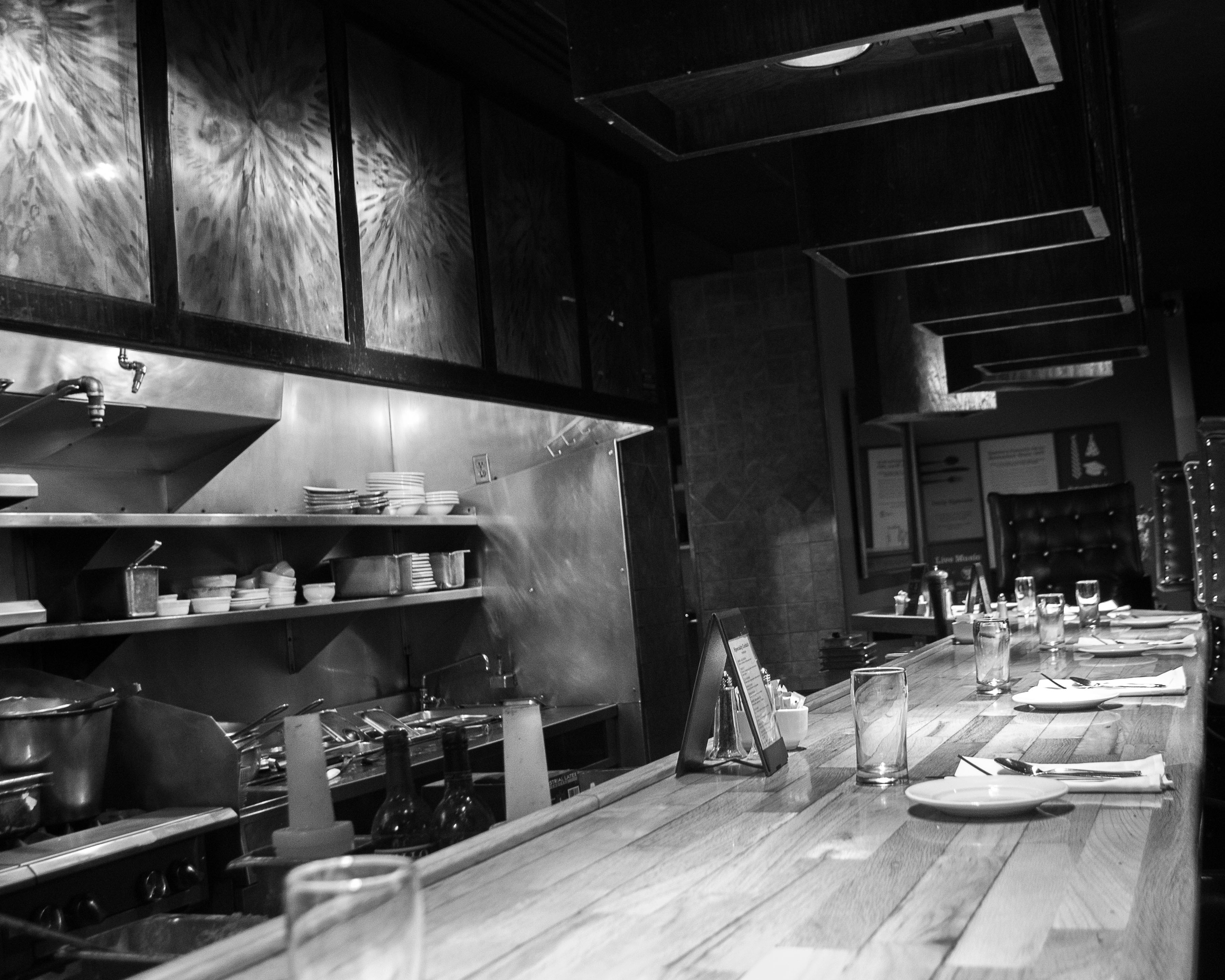
13 Coins counter in Seattle, Washington

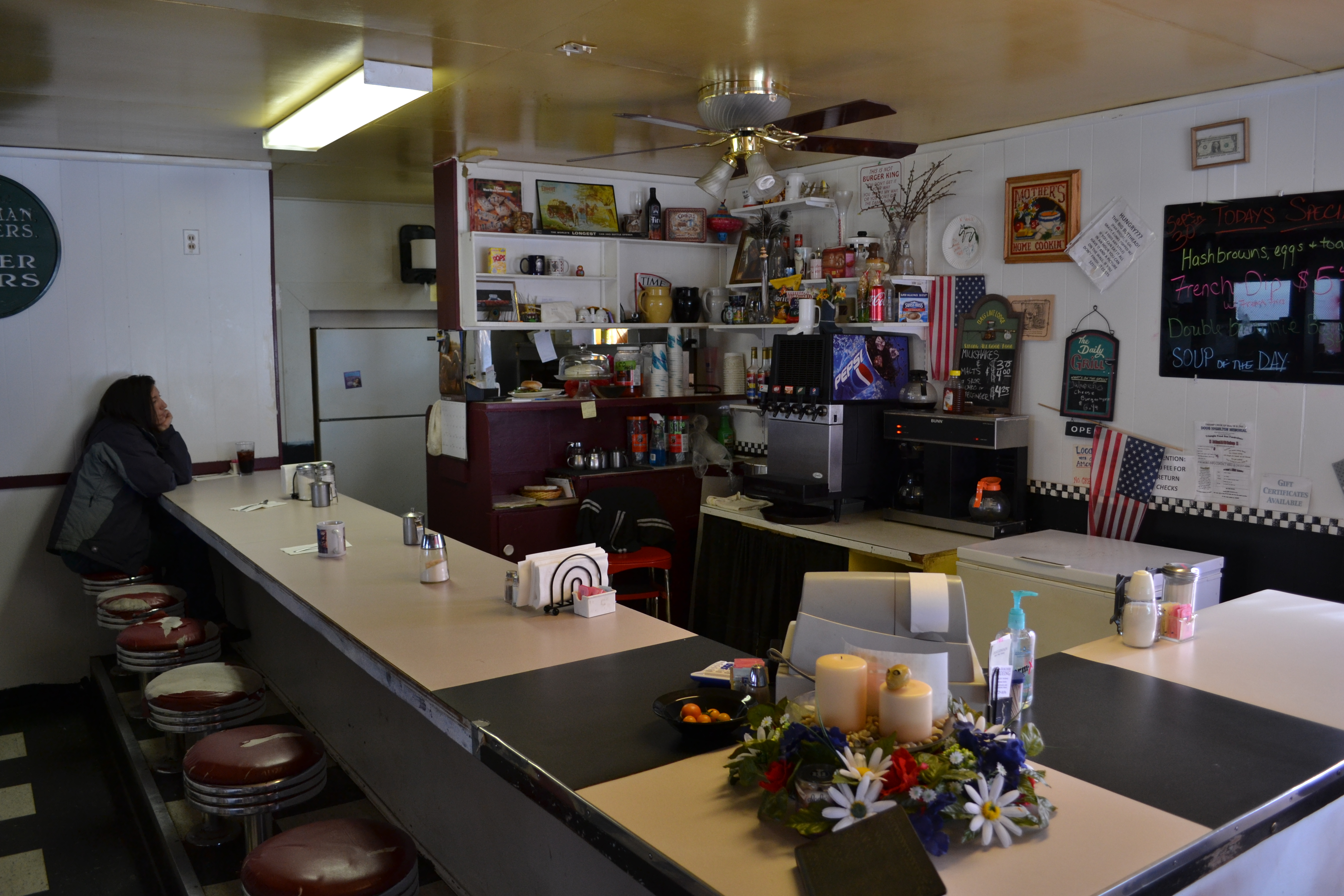
A lunch counter in Low Pass, Oregon

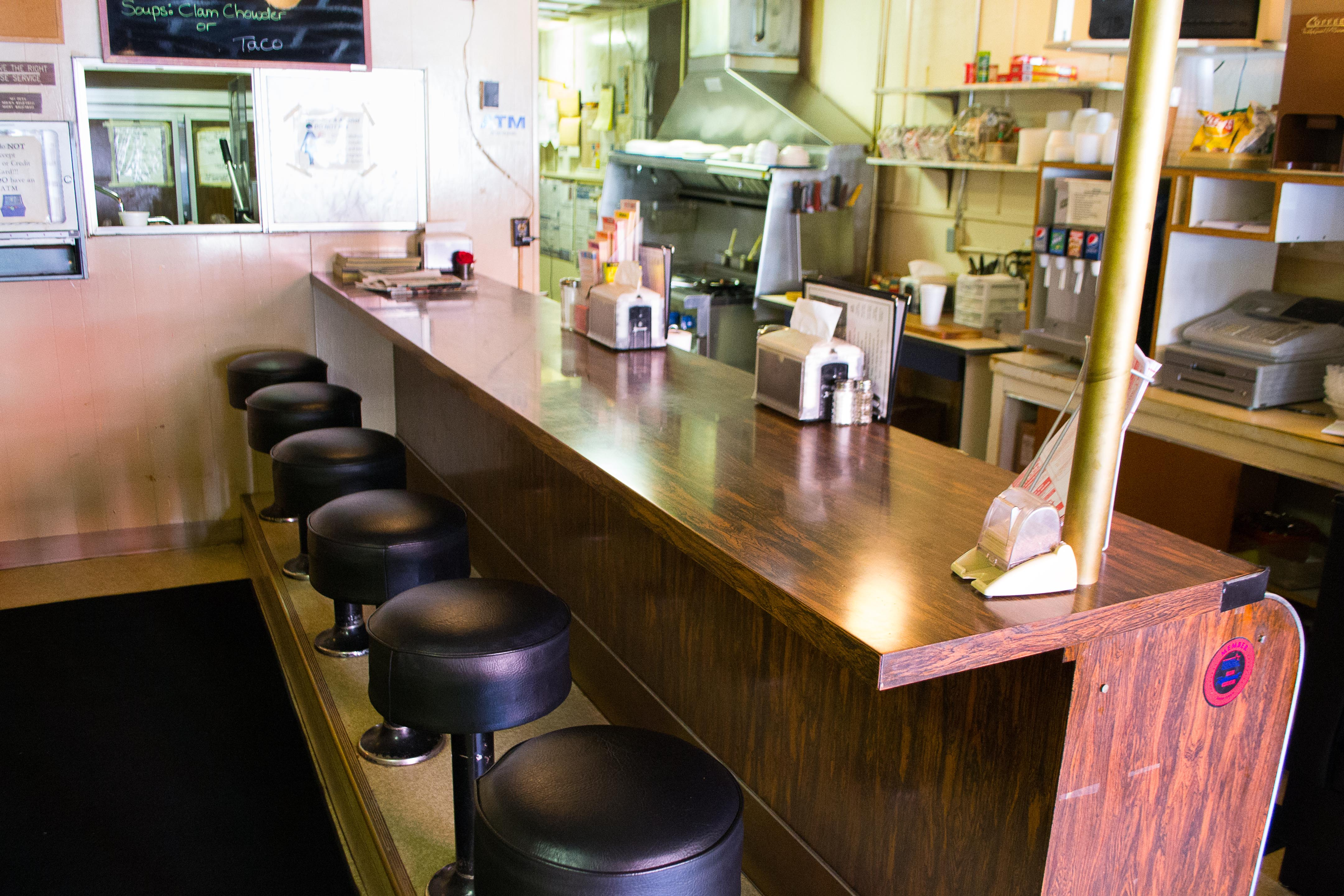
A lunch counter in a very small restaurant

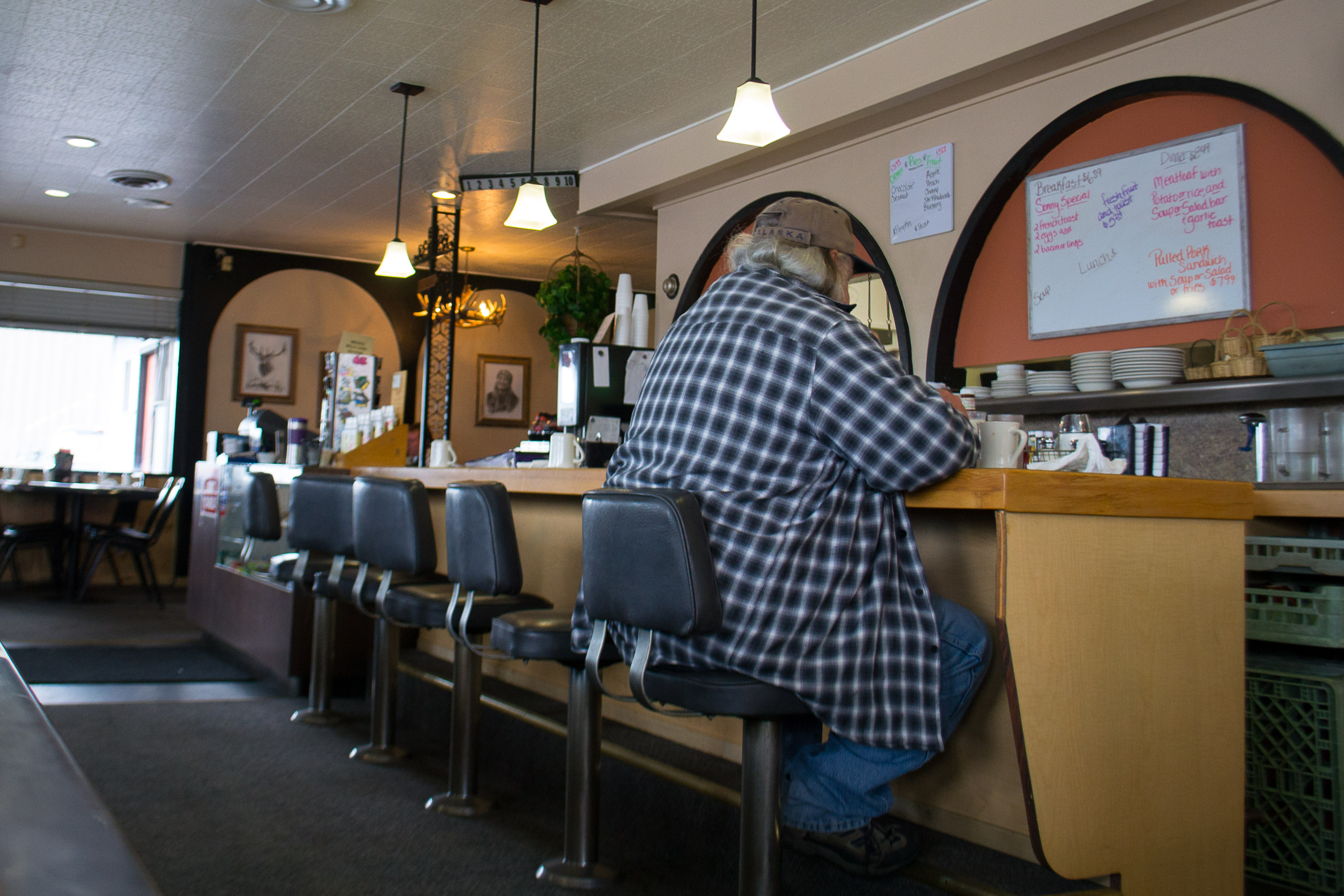
A man eating lunch at a lunch counter

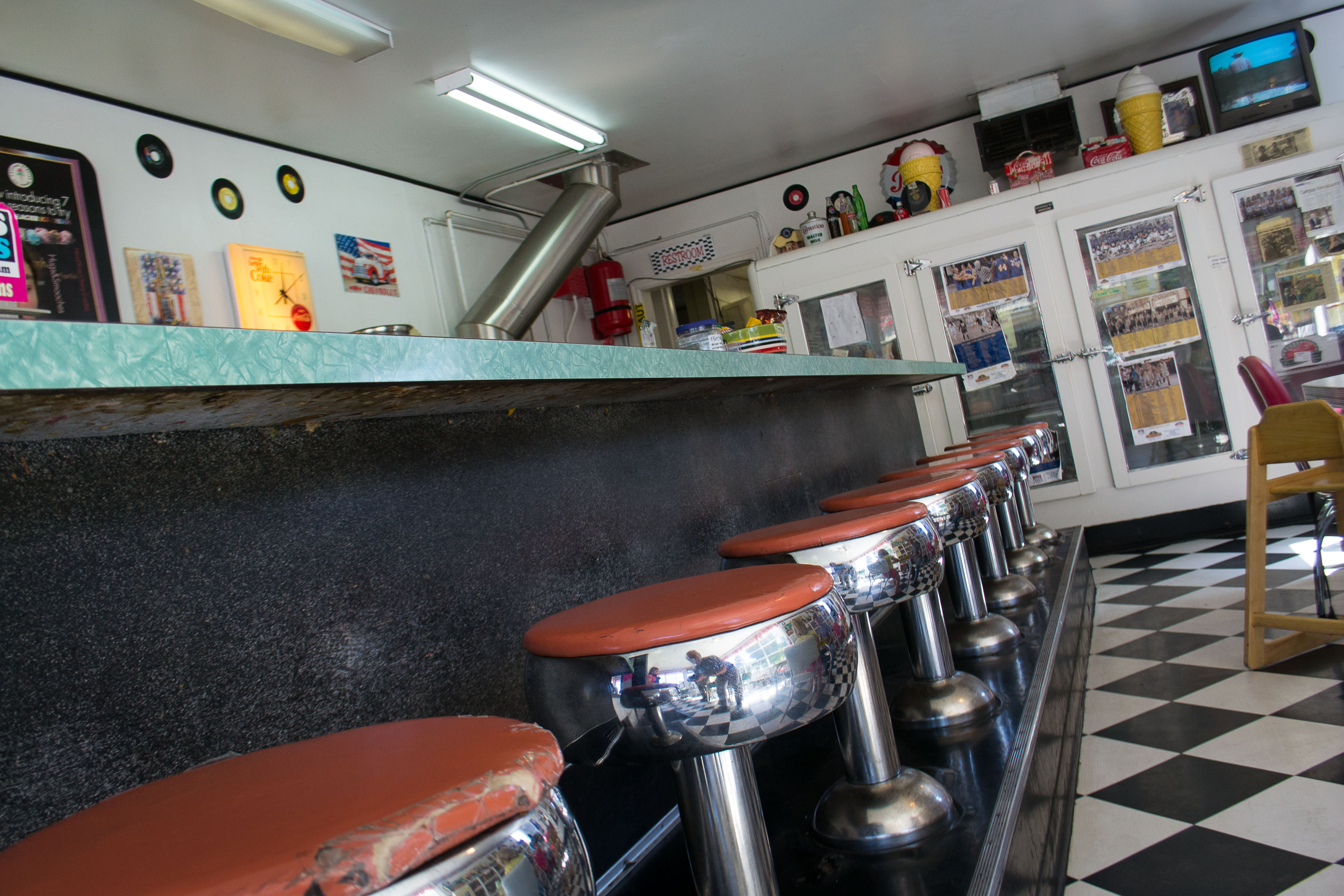
A 1950s lunch counter at Hought's 24 Flavors in La Grande, Oregon

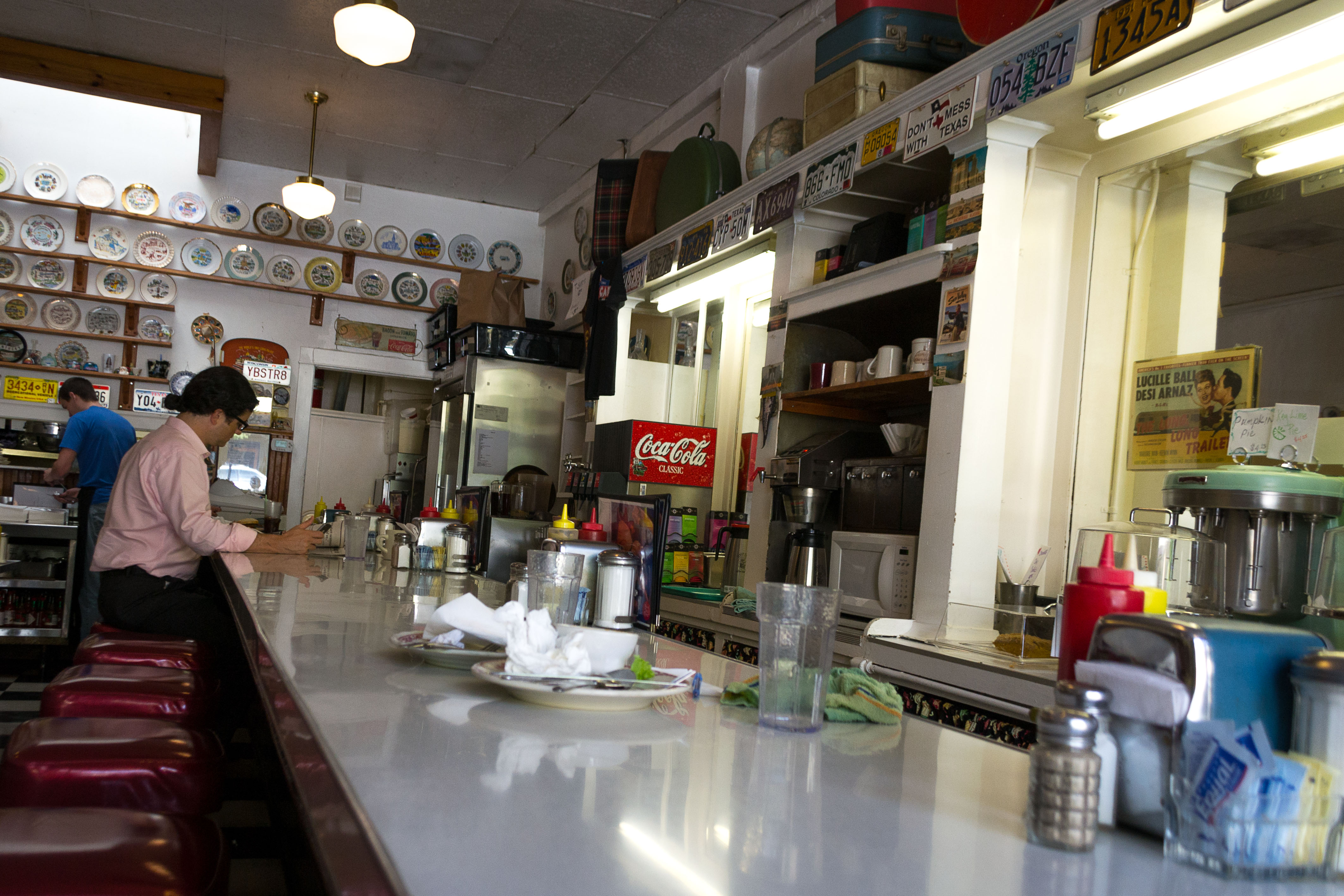
Lunch counter with finished plates

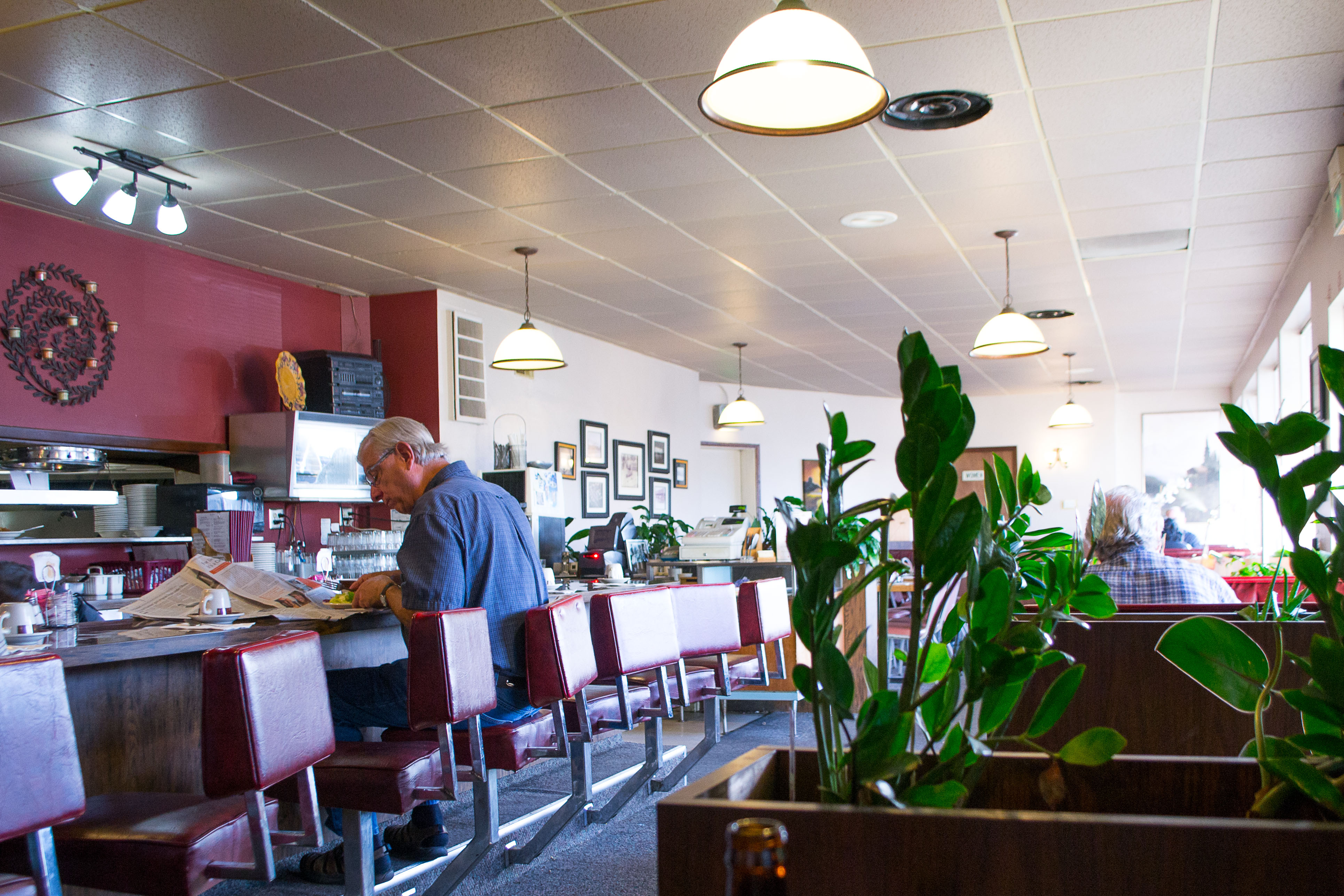
A lunch counter serving an older gentleman

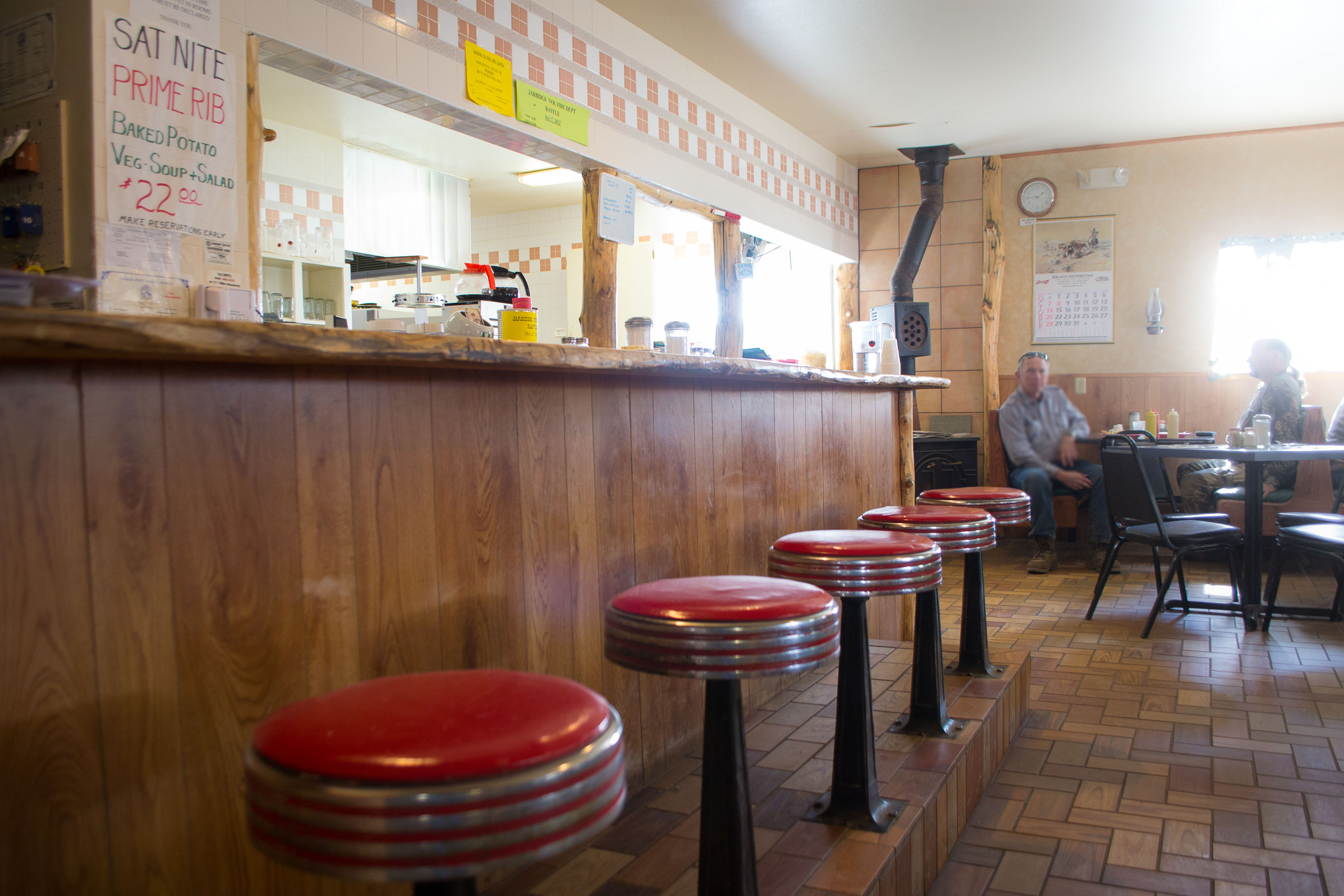
The lunch counter in Jarbidge, Nevada

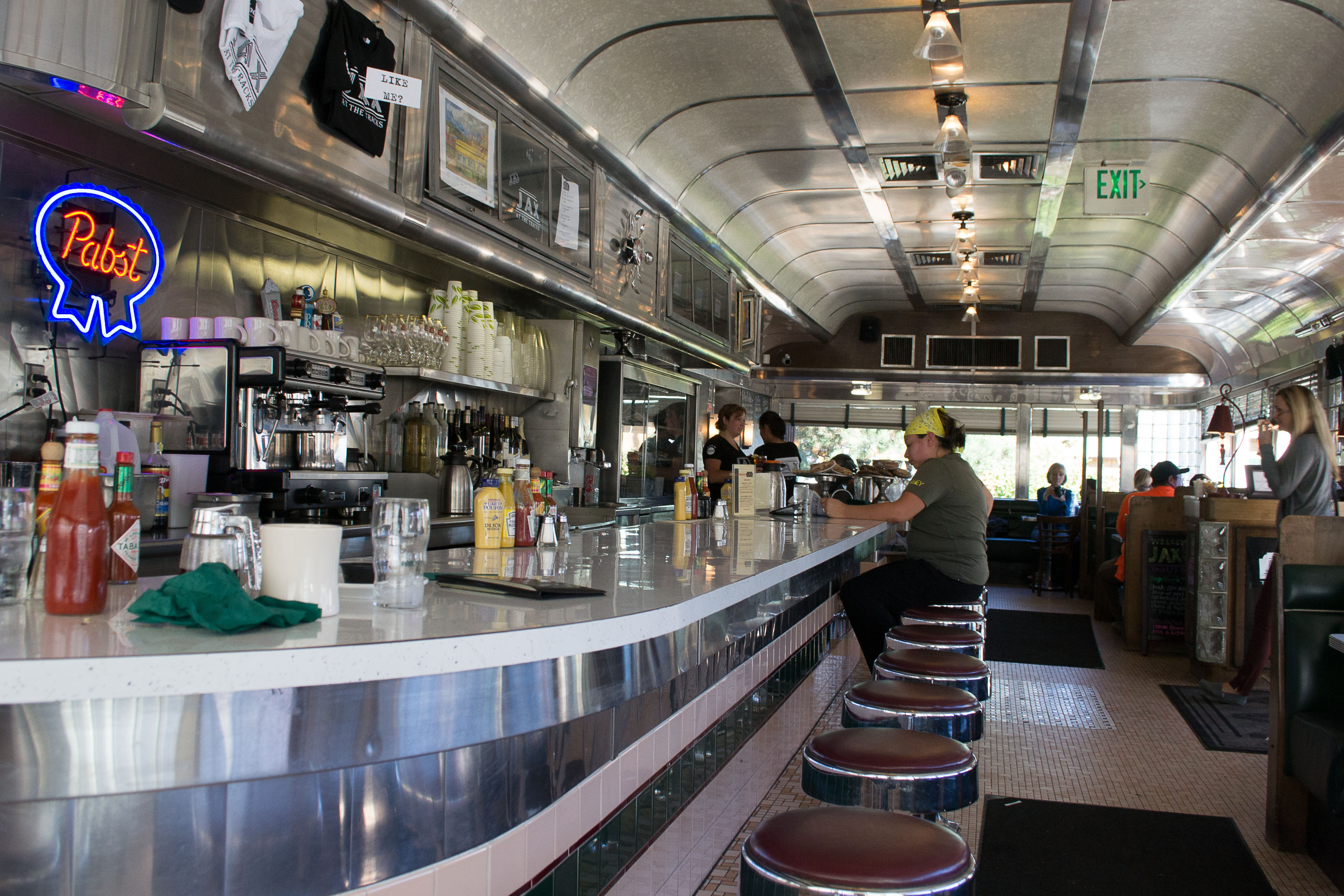
The lunch counter at the JAX Truckee Diner

== See also ==
- Diner
- Jim Crow laws
- Food truck
- Free lunch
- Greasy spoon
- Snack bar
- Soda jerk
