= Franklin McCain =

African-American civil rights activist (1941–2014)

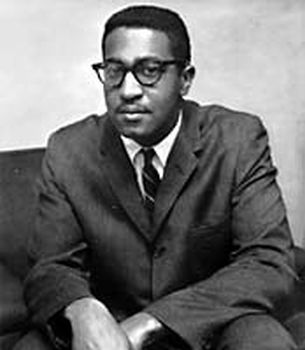
- McCain c. 1960
- Born: Franklin Eugene McCain; January 3, 1941; Union County, North Carolina, US
- Died: January 9, 2014 (aged 73); Moses Cone Hospital, Greensboro, North Carolina, US
- Resting place: Oaklawn Cemetery, Charlotte, North Carolina, US
- Education: North Carolina A&T State University (BS, MA)
- Occupations: Civil rights activist, Chemist
- Known for: Staging the Greensboro sit-ins
- Spouse: Bettye Davis McCain (m. 1965; died 2013)
- Children: 3

Franklin Eugene McCain (January 3, 1941 – January 9, 2014) was an American civil rights activist and member of the Greensboro Four. McCain, along with fellow North Carolina A&T State University students Ezell Blair Jr., Joseph McNeil and David Richmond, staged a sit-in protest at the Woolworth lunch counter in Greensboro, North Carolina, on February 1, 1960, after they were refused service due to the color of their skin. Their actions were credited with launching the Greensboro sit-ins, a massive protest across state lines involving mostly students who took a stand against discrimination in restaurants and stores by refusing to leave when service was denied to them. The sit-ins successfully brought about the reversal of Woolworth's policy of racial segregation in their southern stores, and increased national sentiment to the fight of African-Americans in the south.

== Early life, education and protest ==
McCain was born in Union County, North Carolina, on January 3, 1941. He attended James B. Dudley High School in Greensboro for one year where he initially met his soon-to-be partner in the Greensboro Sit-ins, Ezell Blair Jr., but moved with his family to Northeast, Washington, D.C. McCain graduated from Eastern High School in Washington D.C. in 1959. In the fall of 1959, McCain enrolled at North Carolina Agricultural and Technical State University. During McCain's first year, he lived in a dormitory with David Richmond and resided in the same building as Ezell Blair Jr. and Joseph McNeil. During this time, the four men became extremely close friends. They would frequently gather in one of their dorms to have deep conversations about racial inequalities in America. The conversations would go on for so long that it was common for the men to fall asleep right where they sat chatting. McCain said that they "finally felt hypocritical" for doing nothing along with many in the country, and they decided it was time to take a stance.

McCain weighed over 200 pounds and towered over his comrades at 6'2". Despite his intimidating build, he was regarded as quiet and was not on any athletic teams in school, as he instead preferred the close companionship of his friends. McCain and his three friends devised a plan to sit down at a store's white-only counter and not leave until they were served. McCain later said that five-and-dime stores would often put ads on TV encouraging everyone to shop in their store, but once black people got there, they were treated as unwelcome guests. He said it really "added insult to injury", so the men thought this would be a good place to start their protest. Ultimately, it was McCain who gave the final call as his friends began to get cold feet about the situation. Quiet McCain is remembered for saying, "Are you guys chicken or not?" Moments later, the four men were out the door on the way to accomplish their mission.

In February 1960, the four men refused to leave Woolworth's, one of the world's largest retailers, after they were denied service. McCain later said, "I felt that this could be the last day of my life" but that "we had absolutely no choice." Despite being scared, the men stood their ground. McCain compared the men to "Mack trucks" because there was no way anyone could move them from their seats. The longer the men sat, the more McCain realized that no one was stopping them. He recalled thinking, "Maybe they can't do anything to us; maybe we can keep it up." Ten days later, the protest had spread to fifteen cities in five different states. The movement's success helped prove that non-violent and mobilized citizens could make a profound difference. Martin Luther King Jr. even credited the sit-ins with giving new energy to the Civil Rights Movement.

In 1964, McCain graduated from North Carolina A&T with bachelor's degrees in both biology and chemistry. He later earned his Master of Arts degree from A&T and also studied and trained at North Carolina State University in Raleigh, North Carolina, Princeton University in New Jersey, Farr Associates in Greensboro and American Management Association in New York City.

== Later life and death ==
After graduating from North Carolina A&T, McCain moved to Charlotte, North Carolina, where he worked at the Celanese Corporation, a chemical manufacturer, where he built upon his career for 35 years. McCain also served as a member of the boards of trustees for both North Carolina A&T and North Carolina Central Universities; as well as the Board of Visitors of Bennett College; and the Board of Governors of the University of North Carolina. McCain was also known for meeting with local Charlotte teenagers and encouraging them to stay in school.

On January 9, 2014, McCain died from respiratory complications at Moses H. Cone Memorial Hospital in Greensboro, North Carolina, six days after his 73rd birthday. McCain's death left Ezell Blair (now Jibreel Khazan) and Joseph McNeil as the two surviving members of the Greensboro Four. David Richmond, the fourth member and McCain's first-year college roommate, died in 1990.

Shortly before his death, McCain was interviewed by his granddaughter, Taylor, who asked him to define freedom. McCain responded simply that he sees freedom as being able to "be oneself in society at large".

== Personal life ==
McCain was married to his wife, Bettye Davis McCain, from 1965 until she died in 2013. The two had three sons: Franklin Jr., Wendell, and W. Bertrand McCain. He was also a member of Sigma Pi Phi, the oldest African-American Greek-lettered organization.

== Legacy ==
The section of the lunch counter where McCain and his fellow protesters sat is now preserved at the National Museum of American History. In 2002, North Carolina A&T commissioned a monument to be created in honor of McCain and the three other members of the Greensboro Four. The sculpture named February One was unveiled during the 42nd anniversary of the Greensboro Sit-ins. In addition to the monument, the four men each have residence halls named for them on the university campus.

In 1991, McCain received the honorary Doctor of Philosophy in Humanities from NC A&T State University. He went on to hold positions on the NAACP Legal Defense and Educational Fund Board and the National Conference for Christians and Jews. Upon the election of Obama, McCain spoke to NC A&T State alumni declaring that the hard work was "just about to begin" as he urged blacks to be more active in civic events like attending city council meetings.

Franklin McCain's grandson, Franklin "Mac" McCain III, was a starting cornerback for North Carolina A&T, Franklin Sr.'s alma mater. He later played in the National Football League (NFL) for the Denver Broncos and Philadelphia Eagles.
