= Ezell Blair Jr. =

American civil rights activist (born 1941)

- Born: Ezell Alexander Blair Jr. October 18, 1941 (age 84); Greensboro, North Carolina, U.S.
- Education: North Carolina A&T State University; Howard University Law School; Massachusetts University; New England Conservatory of Music
- Known for: Staging Greensboro sit-ins during Civil Rights Movement
- Spouse: Lorraine France George
- Children: 3

Jibreel Khazan (born Ezell Alexander Blair Jr.; October 18, 1941) is a civil rights activist who is best known as a member of the Greensboro Four, a group of African American college students who, on February 1, 1960, sat down at a segregated Woolworth's lunch counter in downtown Greensboro, North Carolina challenging the store's policy of denying service to non-white customers. The protests and the subsequent events were major milestones in the Civil Rights Movement.

== Early life and education ==
Khazan was born Ezell Alexander Blair Jr. on October 18, 1941, in Greensboro, North Carolina. Khazan received his early education from Dudley High School, where his father taught. His father was a member of the NAACP and very vocal on the subject of racial injustices and "things naturally rubbed off on me", described Khazan in a 1974 interview. It was said that when he experienced unjust treatment based on color, he "stood up." Khazan also recalls an American Civics teacher, Mrs. McCullough, who told her class “We’re preparing you for the day when you will have equal rights.”

He was also influenced by Martin Luther King Jr. In 1958, Khazan heard King speak at the local Bennett College. He was captivated as King addressed the audience in attendance. At that speech, King called for an escalation of nonviolent protests to end segregated accommodation. King's words had made a huge impact with Khazan, so much so that he later remarked that "he could feel his heart palpitating" and that the words of King "brought tears to his eyes."

In 1959, Khazan graduated from James B. Dudley High School, and entered the A&T College of North Carolina. It was during his freshman year that Khazan and his roommate, Joseph McNeil; along with two other associates, Franklin McCain and David Richmond, devised a plan to protest against the policies of the segregated lunch counter at the downtown Greensboro F. W. Woolworth's store. On February 1, 1960, Blair, along with McNeil, Franklin and Richmond, took the bold step of violating the Greensboro Woolworth's segregation policy. Khazan stated that he had seen a documentary on Mohandas Gandhi's use of "passive insistence" that had inspired him to act. Each of the participants in the sit-in had different catalysts, but it is clear that the four men had a close friendship that mutually reinforced their desire to act. His 1964 interview describes the Greensboro sit-ins in Chapter 5 of Who Speaks for the Negro?

The sit-in demonstrations were just the beginning of Khazan's community involvement. He joined Alpha Phi Alpha, was elected president of the junior class, and would later become president of the school's student government association, the campus NAACP and the Greensboro Congress for Racial Equality. In 1963, Khazan graduated from A&T College with a Bachelor's degree in sociology and Social Studies. After graduation, He briefly studied law at Howard University Law School in Washington, DC. He continued his education at Massachusetts University and later at the New England Conservatory of Music, where he studied voice.

== Later life ==
As he had been labeled a "troublemaker" for his role in the Greensboro Sit-Ins, life in Greensboro became difficult for Khazan. In 1965, he moved to New Bedford, Massachusetts, where he worked as a teacher and counselor for the developmentally challenged. In 1968, he joined the Islamic Center of New England and changed his name to Jibreel Khazan. Today Khazan is an oral historian and lecturer. Following the death of Joseph McNeil on September 4, 2025, Khazan is the last surviving member of the Greensboro Four.

== Legacy ==
In 1991, Khazan received an honorary doctorate of humanities degree from North Carolina A&T State University. In 2002, North Carolina A&T commissioned a statue to be sculpted honoring Khazan, along with the three other members of the A&T four: Franklin McCain, Joseph McNeil, and David Richmond. In addition, the four men each have residence halls named for them on the university campus. In 2010, Khazan was the recipient of the James Smithson Bicentennial Medal from the Smithsonian Institution. On October 12, 2021, Khazan was honored with the renaming of a city park in the west end of New Bedford, MA.

== Personal life ==
Khazan is married to the former Lorraine France George of New Bedford. Together they have three children.
