= Joseph McNeil =

United States Air Force general (1942–2025)

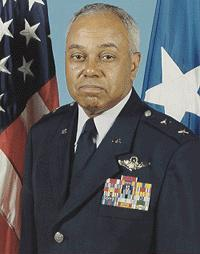
- McNeil, c. 2000
- Born: Joseph Alfred McNeil; March 25, 1942; Wilmington, North Carolina, U.S.
- Died: September 4, 2025 (aged 83); Port Jefferson, New York, U.S.
- Spouse: Ina (Brown) McNeil
- Military career
- Allegiance: United States of America
- Branch: United States Air Force
- Service years: 1963–2000
- Rank: Major General
- Commands: 702nd Military Airlift Squadron; 22nd Air Force
- Conflict / operations: Vietnam War; Operation Arc Light; Operation Young Tiger
- Awards: Legion of Merit; Meritorious Service Medal; Air Medal (with 3 oak leaf clusters); Navy Distinguished Service Medal; Air Force Commendation Medal; Air Force Achievement Medal; Combat Readiness Medal; National Defense Service Medal; Armed Forces Expeditionary Medal; Vietnam Service Medal (with silver star); Southwest Asia Service Medal (with bronze star); Humanitarian Service Medal; Air Force Longevity Service Award (with 4 oak leaf clusters); Armed Forces Reserve Medal; Republic of Vietnam Gallantry Cross with Palm; Republic of Vietnam Campaign Medal

Joseph Alfred McNeil (March 25, 1942 – September 4, 2025) was a major general in the United States Air Force who was best known for being a member of the Greensboro Four – a group of African American college students who, on February 1, 1960, sat down at a segregated Woolworth's lunch counter in downtown Greensboro, North Carolina, challenging the store's policy of denying service to non-white customers.

== Early life and education ==
Joseph McNeil was born on March 25, 1942, in Wilmington, North Carolina. McNeil grew up Catholic in Wilmington and was president of his parish's Catholic Youth Council. His parish priest at St. Thomas Catholic Church was known to be a supporter of civil rights.

McNeil attended Williston Senior High School, where he was greatly influenced by his high school teachers. Williston Senior High School was a black school, so there were things taught to their students that were probably not taught at the integrated schools. His high school instructors taught their students what their rights were as citizens: what rights they should and do not have, how they could go about obtaining their rights, and how they should react if their homes were invaded. Teachers would often say things like, "They can take your house, your car, all your physical belongings, but they can't take what you have up here." Williston Senior High School had some real solid, inspirational teachers that instilled a real sense of "go out and do something" mentality to their students.

After high school graduation, McNeil's family moved to New York City to seek better job opportunities. In the fall, McNeil entered North Carolina Agricultural and Technical State University on a full scholarship. A stark contrast from the more open northern society he was used to, McNeil found it difficult living in the segregated South.

McNeil went on to earn a Bachelor of Science degree in engineering physics from North Carolina A&T in 1963. He was commissioned as a second lieutenant through the university's ROTC program immediately after graduation.

== Greensboro civil rights sit-ins ==
While attending North Carolina A&T, McNeil met three other freshmen – Ezell Blair Jr., Franklin McCain, and David Richmond – who gravitated towards one another because they lived on the same floor of the dormitory and shared similar interests. The four would later become known as the Greensboro Four. After attending a concert with his friends, McNeil snapped into action because he watched several members of the audience being inconsiderate and arrogant. It was at that moment that McNeil and his peers wanted to act in response to the unacceptable behavior observed at the concert. McNeil began to check out and read several books on propaganda and projection of ideas from the library, one, in particular, was The New Negro.

It is often believed that McNeil and his peers were inspired by Gandhi, however, McNeil said, "I'm not nonviolent. I'm an agnostic. I see the need for strong religious identification in this thing [Civil Rights Movement] and the work of religious leaders." McNeil would pray and attend church because the church was the rallying point of the movement, and it is a rallying point today. Gandhi's ways were expedient, and they were the only thing that McNeil and others in the Civil Rights Movement could do. The people acting in the Civil Rights Movement could not afford to be violent because it would blow the image that the movement was trying to project.

McNeil was a member of the Reserve Officer Training Corps (ROTC) at North Carolina A&T. ROTC taught McNeil a different type of leadership: things are done methodically, there is an objective, and most importantly, you follow. If one is ever going to lead, then one must follow. McNeil and the rest of the Greensboro Four heavily relied on the students in ROTC to provide the mobilization concepts, attend meetings, and negotiate. People within the local community, ministers, and undertakers came together to support the movement. McNeil's most memorable memory was that if he needed bail money for going to jail, that various African American Greensboro citizens would offer to put up their land as bail. McNeil and his peers did not need much money because they would just need money to make a picket sign. Given that McNeil and his peers were students, their needs were simple, since they had shelter and food, and could take risks that others could not take.

McNeil would often converse with NAACP member and local Greensboro merchant Ralph Johns. Ralph was greatly immersed in the community as he demonstratively showed support for North Carolina A&T and the students. Ralph would tell McNeil about how he tried to convince people to do a sit-in type of protest, and McNeil felt a deep need to contribute. The Greensboro sit-ins became a reality because of the support and direction that Ralph Johns gave McNeil and his peers. Ralph understood that the sit-in needed to be publicized because without publicity, it is like a tree falling in the forest and nobody noticing. Ralph was the one who notified Jo Spivey and the press about the sit-in at the downtown Greensboro Woolworth Store.

On February 1, 1960, McNeil and his fellow activists, Ezell Blair, Franklin McCain and David Richmond, walked together from the university's library to the Woolworth's store in downtown Greensboro. Once there, the men purchased some items, and then sat down at the "whites only" lunch counter, where the group was refused service. McNeil and the group stayed until the store closed, and then left to return the next day.

As media coverage of the sit-ins grew, more protests were staged throughout the state of North Carolina, and in other Southern cities. As sales at boycotted stores began to be affected by the protests, store owners began to serve all customers in their establishments. After staging the sit-ins, McNeil became involved with the formation of the Student Executive Committee for Justice. This joint organization between A&T students and the women of nearby Bennett College, focused on the picketing of segregated downtown Greensboro establishments. McNeil would later participate in negotiations between student protesters, Woolworth's management, and the Human Relations Commission.

== Military career ==
In July 1963, McNeil was assigned to James Connally Air Force Base near Waco, Texas, for Training. From 1964 to 1969, McNeil was assigned to Ellsworth Air Force Base, South Dakota where he served as a KC-135 navigator. McNeil spent considerable time in Southeast Asia flying in operations Arc Light and Young Tiger. During this period, he was promoted to the ranks of first lieutenant and captain. In 1972, McNeil served as a navigator instructor, flight commander, executive officer and Commander of the 702nd Military Airlift Squadron at McGuire Air Force Base, New Jersey. During this time, he also served as a liaison officer in for the U.S. Air Force Academy. In 1989, McNeil served as special assistant to the Vice Commander and Commander of the 514th Airlift Wing at McGuire Air Force Base. During this time, McNeil was promoted to the ranks of major, lieutenant colonel, and colonel.

After leaving active duty in 1969 with the rank of captain, McNeil continued to serve in the Air Force Reserve. From 1992 to 1995, he served as vice commander, and later commander, of the 22nd Air Force stationed at Dobbins Air Reserve Base, Georgia. He would also be promoted to the rank of brigadier general in 1994. In August 1995, McNeil would serve as mobilization assistant to the vice commander, and later the commander, at the Air Force Reserve Command Headquarters at Robins Air Force Base in Georgia. In 2000, McNeil retired from the Air Force Reserve as a major general, having been promoted to the rank in 1996. After a military career of over thirty-seven years, and over 6,600 flight hours, he received the Air Force Distinguished Service Medal upon retirement.

== Civilian career ==
As a traditional reservist, McNeil was able to develop a civilian career while continuing to serve in the U.S. Air Force. McNeil established himself in the private and public sectors with time spent starting a series of diversity programs, working in computer sales for IBM, working for the Bankers Trust in New York City as a commercial banker, and as a stockbroker for E.F. Hutton in Fayetteville, North Carolina. McNeil joined the Federal Aviation Administration, where he served as assistant division manager of the administration's Eastern Region Flight Standards Division and the manager of the New York Flight Standards District Office. In 2002, McNeil retired from the Federal Aviation Administration, after serving for over 15 years.

== Civilian honors and legacy ==
McNeil held four honorary doctorates: a Doctor of Philosophy degree from his alma mater, North Carolina A&T State University in 1991; a Doctor of Laws degree from St. John's University in 1998; a Doctor of Humanities from the University of North Carolina at Wilmington in 2010; and a Doctor of Laws degree from Molloy College in 2015.

In 2002, North Carolina A&T commissioned a statue to be sculpted honoring McNeil, along with the three other members of the A&T four: Franklin McCain, Ezell Blair Jr. (later known as Jibreel Khazan), and David Richmond. In addition, the four men each have residence halls named for them on the university campus. In 2010, McNeil was the recipient of the James Smithson Bicentennial Medal from the Smithsonian Institution.

== Personal life and death ==
McNeil was married to Ina McNeil (née Brown), an accomplished Indigenous quilt maker of Lakota descent, and the great-great-granddaughter of Chief Sitting Bull. The two met while he was stationed in South Dakota, while working with an organization that exposed discriminatory housing practices in the state. The two were married in 1967, and together had five children.

McNeil died of Parkinson's disease in Port Jefferson, New York, on September 4, 2025, at the age of 83.
