= David Richmond (activist) =

American civil rights activist (1941–1990)

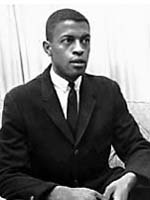
- Richmond c. 1960
- Born: April 20, 1941; Greensboro, North Carolina, US
- Died: December 7, 1990 (aged 49); Greensboro, North Carolina, US
- Resting place: Carolina Biblical Gardens, Jamestown, North Carolina
- Education: North Carolina A&T State University
- Spouse: Yvonne Bryson
- Children: 3

David Leinail Richmond (April 20, 1941 – December 7, 1990) was a civil rights activist for most of his life, but he was best known for being one of the Greensboro Four. Richmond was a student at North Carolina A&T during the time of the Greensboro protests, but never ended up graduating from A&T. He felt pressure from the residual celebrity of being one of the Greensboro Four; his life was threatened in Greensboro and he was forced to move to Franklin, NC. Eventually, he moved back to Greensboro to take care of his father. Richmond was awarded the Levi Coffin Award for leadership in human rights by the Greensboro Chamber of Commerce in 1980. Richmond seemed to be haunted by the fact that he could not do more to improve his world, and battled alcoholism and depression. He died in 1990 and was awarded a posthumous honorary doctorate degree from North Carolina A&T.

== Early life and education ==
David Leinail Richmond was born in Greensboro, North Carolina on April 20, 1941, and grew up in Greensboro, graduating from James B. Dudley High School in 1959. At DHS, Richmond was a popular student, participating in many sports and clubs; he even set the state record for high jump in 1959 while on the track and field team. After graduating high school, he enrolled in college at North Carolina A&T State University, majoring in business administration and accounting. During his second semester of college, David and his friends participated in one of the most influential sit-ins of the Civil Rights Movement

On February 1, 1960, Richmond, along with three other A&T freshmen: Ezell Blair Jr., Franklin McCain and Joseph McNeil, walked together from the university's library to the downtown Greensboro Woolworth store. They purchased items from a desegregated counter, then sat down at the "whites only" lunch counter, where they were refused service. Richmond and the group stayed until the store closed, then left, to return the next day.

== Greensboro Four ==
Joseph McNeil, Franklin McCain, David Richmond, and Jibreel Khazan asked for service on February 1, 1960, at the F. W. Woolworth department store's lunch counter. They were told to go to the other “stand-up counter,” which was designated for use of black people. The young men argued that they had already been served that day, showing the receipts from their earlier purchases. One of the employees, an older black woman, came out and suggested they just follow the rules and use the other counter, as did the manager, but they refused. The boys had already discussed how they distrusted adults because they had years to take action and protest these laws, but had never done anything. Eventually, a police officer came in, but since they were doing nothing but sitting and politely disagreeing with the employees, he did not know what to do with them. Their nonviolent actions had completely baffled him. McCain later recalled an older white woman coming up to him and telling him how disappointed she was. He politely asked her why, and she answered that she was disappointed it had taken them so long to do something like that. They continued sitting at the counter until the manager declared that the store was closing early; the boys were triumphant, fearing earlier that they would leave the store in handcuffs or on a stretcher.

The Greensboro Four were not the first people to nonviolently protest segregation; seven people did the same three years earlier in Durham, NC. The difference, however, was how organically the movement grew, in addition to publicity. A photo was taken during that first protest of the four young men, and this sufficed to garner attention. Within the next four days, the protesters grew from four young men to hundreds of students from A&T, UNC Greensboro, Bennett College, and even Dudley High School. By the second week, there were dozens of cities across the United States seeing protests from thousands of students. On July 25, 1960, only five months after the Greensboro Four took this first step towards desegregation, the first African-Americans were served at Woolworth's. This led to nationwide desegregation of many public facilities, and is considered by some to be the true beginning of the American Civil Rights Movement.

=== Later life ===
After the sit-ins, Richmond had trouble keeping up with his schoolwork, falling behind and eventually dropping out. After leaving A&T, Richmond got a job as a counselor-coordinator at the CETA program in Greensboro. He received multiple death threats and eventually left Greensboro, moving to Franklin, North Carolina, located in the mountains. He got married while at A&T, eventually getting divorced, remarried, and divorced again. He has three children, and Chip, his son, was a starter on the Wake Forest University football team. Richmond eventually returned to Greensboro to take care of his parents, but had a hard time finding employment while dealing with the label of “troublemaker.” He eventually found a job as a janitor at the Greensboro Health Care Center

=== Death and legacy ===
David Richmond seemed to be haunted by the fact that he could not do more to improve his world, and battled alcoholism and depression before his death. Richmond died of lung cancer on December 7, 1990, at the age of 49. At his memorial service, he was posthumously awarded an honorary doctorate of humanities degree by North Carolina A&T. Other honors awarded to Richmond include the Levi Coffin Award for "leadership in human rights, human relations, and human resources development in Greensboro" given by the Greensboro Chamber of Commerce in 1980, and the James Smithson Bicentennial Medal from the Smithsonian Institution in 2010.

In 2002, North Carolina A&T commissioned a statue honoring Richmond, along with the three other members of the A&T four: Franklin McCain, Ezell Blair Jr (later known as Jibreel Khazan), and Joseph McNeil. In addition, the four men have residence halls named for them on the university campus.

=== Personal life ===
Richmond, who was married and divorced twice, was the father of three children. With his high school girlfriend Dorothy Harrison (née Morton), he fathered a daughter, Angela Morton Obi, who was born in 1959. With his first wife, whom he married while in college, he has two children, David "Chip" Richmond Jr. and Hadelyn (Lynn) Richmond Massenburg. Richmond and his second wife, Yvonne Bryson, had no children together.
