= Timeline of the 1954–1968 civil rights movement =

This is a timeline of the 1954 to 1968 civil rights movement in the United States, a nonviolent mid-20th century freedom movement to gain legal equality and the enforcement of constitutional rights for all Americans. The goals of the movement included securing equal protection under the law, ending legally institutionalized racial discrimination, and gaining equal access to public facilities, education reform, fair housing, and the ability to vote.

== Pre-civil rights movement, 1946–1953 ==
Some of the 1954-1968 Civil Rights Movement comes from earlier attempts to gain full racial equality. During the Reconstruction era, there were amendments to the United States Constitution which gave rights to former enslaved people: the thirteenth, fourteenth, and fifteenth amendments.

As Jim Crow laws became more popular and plentiful, this led to a deep dive into racial segregation throughout much of the country. Early efforts made by organizations like the NAACP helped lay a foundation for the civil rights movement of the 1950s and 1960s.

=== 1946 ===
- In a landmark decision, the United States Supreme Court ruled in Morgan v. Virginia that a Virginia law imposing racial segregation in public facilities and transportation was unconstitutional, as the Commerce clause protected interstate traffic. However, neither Virginia nor other states observed the ruling, and it was not enforced for decades.

=== 1947 ===
- April 14 – In Mendez v. Westminster, the U.S. Court of Appeals for the Ninth Circuit rules that the forced segregation of Mexican-American students into separate "Mexican schools" was unconstitutional and unlawful.

=== 1948 ===
- On Feb. 2, Silas Herbert Hunt breaks the color barrier in the South, enrolling in the University of Arkansas School of Law. He was still required to take classes separately from White students.
- In Delgado v Bastrop I.S.D., the Texas Attorney General decided that segregation of Mexican-American children was illegal.
- In Shelley v. Kraemer, the U.S. Supreme Court ruled that racially restrictive covenants violate the Fourteenth Amendment's equal protection clause and thus cannot be enforced by courts, though they may still be agreed to by private parties.
- The anthology series Destination Freedom premiers on local Chicago radio. This radio drama, produced by Richard Durham, will appear on Sunday mornings until mid-1950.
- In 1948, the United States Supreme Court ruled in Sipuel v. Board of Regents of Univ. of Okla. that the state of Oklahoma must provide instruction for Blacks equal to that of Whites. Thurgood Marshall acted as the head NAACP lawyer for this case and the justices ruled unanimously. The case was also a precursor for Brown v. Board of Education.

=== 1950 ===
- During the early years of the Miss America pageant, under the directorship of Lenora Slaughter, it became racially segregated via rule number seven that stated: "contestants must be of good health and of the White race.” Rule number seven was abolished in 1950.
- In Henderson v. United States, the U.S. Supreme Court ruled that racial segregation on railway dining cars violated the Interstate Commerce Act of 1887.

=== 1951 ===
- In April 1951, students at Robert Russa Moton High School, a segregated "Colored" school in Prince Edward County Virginia, staged a student strike over poor conditions and racial segregation. That strike led to the NAACP filing Davis v. County School Board of Prince Edward County in 1952.
- On May 11, 1951, Lillie Mae Bradford, four years before Rosa Park's more publicized action, performed an act of civil disobedience on a city bus in Montgomery, Alabama, for which she was arrested, on a charge of disorderly conduct. She saw that the bus driver had punched her ticket for the wrong price, apparently "a costly and frequently recurring error if it was indeed an error". Bradford asked to be charged the correct price, and after being told twice to return to the back of the bus, she sat down in the front.
- On December 25, 1951, the house of Harry and Harriette Moore in Mims, Florida was bombed. Harry died while being transported to the hospital, while Harriette died nine days later of her injuries. Their assassination made them the first martyrs of the movement and was the first assassination of any activist to occur during the Civil Rights Movement, and the only time that a husband and wife were killed during the history of the movement.

=== 1952 ===
- The Briggs v. Elliott petition signed by parents in Summerton, South Carolina becomes first case in history that attacks segregation in public education. Due to what some say was clerical error, and what some speculate behind closed doors, Governor Jimmy Byrnes lobbied to move Briggs as lead case and instead, Brown v. Board of Education. On behalf of Black parents and children, the NAACP filed five lawsuits against school segregation that challenged the legality of the 1896 "separate but equal" ruling in Plessy v. Ferguson. The five cases were Brown v. Board of Education, from Topeka Kansas, Davis v. County School Board of Prince Edward County from Virginia, Bolling v. Sharpe from Washington DC, Briggs v. Elliott from Clarendon County South Carolina, and Bulah v. Gebhart from Delaware. The five cases were later consolidated in the Supreme Court's Brown v. Board of Education ruling.

== 1954–1959 ==
=== 1954 ===
- May 3 – In Hernandez v. Texas, the U.S. Supreme Court rules that Mexican Americans and all other racial groups in the United States are entitled to equal protection under the 14th Amendment to the U.S. Constitution.
- May 17 – In Brown v. Board of Education of Topeka, Kans. and Bolling v. Sharpe, the U.S. Supreme Court rules against the "separate but equal" doctrine, overturning Plessy v. Ferguson and saying that segregation of public schools is unconstitutional.
- May 28 – The Fayetteville, Arkansas, school board votes unanimously to integrate its historically Black school, Lincoln, with its White schools, starting with high school and gradually integrating junior highs and elementaries over an undefined period.
- July 27 – The Charleston, Arkansas, school board unanimously votes to end segregation in the school district. Ending segregation for first through twelfth grades, the Charleston school district was the first school district among the former Confederate States to desegregate. The schools opened for the new school year on August 23.
- July 30 – At a special meeting in Jackson, Mississippi, called by Governor Hugh White, T.R.M. Howard of the Regional Council of Negro Leadership, along with nearly one hundred other Black leaders, publicly refuse to support a segregationist plan to maintain "separate but equal" in exchange for a crash program to increase spending on Black schools.
- September 2 – In Montgomery, Alabama, 23 Black children are prevented from attending all-White elementary schools, defying the recent U.S. Supreme Court ruling.
- September 7 – The District of Columbia ends segregated education; Baltimore, Maryland, follows suit on September 8.
- September 15 – Protests by White parents in White Sulphur Springs, West Virginia, force schools to postpone desegregation another year.
- September 16 – Mississippi attempts to abolish all public schools with an amendment to its State Constitution, but the amendment fails.
- September 30 – Integration of a high school in Milford, Delaware, collapses when White students boycott classes.
- October 4 – Student demonstrations take place against integration of Washington, DC, public schools.
- October 19 – Federal judge upholds an Oklahoma law requiring African-American candidates to be identified on voting ballots as "Negro".
- October 30 – Desegregation of the U.S. Armed Forces said to be complete.
- Frankie Muse Freeman is the lead attorney for the landmark NAACP case Davis et al. v. the St. Louis Housing Authority, which ended legal racial discrimination in the city's public housing. Constance Baker Motley was an attorney for NAACP: it was unusual to have two women attorneys leading such a high-profile case.

=== 1955 ===
- January 15 – President Dwight D. Eisenhower signs Executive Order 10590, establishing the President's Committee on Government Policy to enforce a nondiscrimination policy in Federal employment.
- January 20 – Demonstrators from CORE and Morgan State University stage a successful sit-in to desegregate Read's Drug Store in Baltimore, Maryland.
- April 5 – Mississippi passes a law penalizing white students by jail and fines who attend school with blacks.
- March 2 – 15-year-old Claudette Colvin refuses to give up her seat on the bus to a white woman, eventually resulting in the Browder v. Gayle case.
- May 7 – NAACP and Regional Council of Negro Leadership activist Reverend George W. Lee is killed in Belzoni, Mississippi.
- May 31 – The U.S. Supreme Court rules in " Brown II" that desegregation must occur with "all deliberate speed".
- June 8 – University of Oklahoma decides to allow black students.
- June 23 – Virginia Governor Thomas B. Stanley and Board of Education decide to continue segregated schools into 1956.
- June 29 – The NAACP wins a U.S. Supreme Court suit which orders the University of Alabama to admit Autherine Lucy.
- July 11 – The Georgia Board of Education orders that any teacher supporting integration be fired.
- July 14 – A Federal Appeals Court overturns segregation on Columbia, South Carolina, buses.
- August 1 – Georgia Board of Education fires all black teachers who are members of the NAACP.
- August 13 – Regional Council of Negro Leadership registration activist Lamar Smith is murdered in Brookhaven, Mississippi.
- August 28 – Teenager Emmett Till is killed for allegedly whistling at a white woman in Money, Mississippi.
- November 7 – The Interstate Commerce Commission bans bus segregation in interstate travel in Sarah Keys v. Carolina Coach Company. On the same day, the U.S. Supreme Court bans segregation on public parks and playgrounds. Georgia Governor Marvin Griffin responds that his state would "get out of the park business" rather than allow playgrounds to be desegregated.
- December 1 – Rosa Parks refuses to give up her seat on a bus, starting the Montgomery bus boycott. This occurs nine months after 15-year-old high school student Claudette Colvin became the first to refuse to give up her seat. Colvin's was the legal case that eventually ended the practice in Montgomery.
- Roy Wilkins becomes the NAACP executive secretary.

=== 1956 ===
- January 2 – Georgia Tech, supported by president Blake R. Van Leer, plays the Sugar Bowl against a Pittsburgh team featuring the African-American player Bobby Grier despite the objections of Governor Griffin on account of Grier's race.
- January 9 – Virginia voters and representatives decide to fund private schools with state money to maintain segregation.
- January 16 – FBI Director J. Edgar Hoover writes a rare open letter of complaint directed to civil rights leader T. R. M. Howard after Howard charged in a speech that the "FBI can pick up pieces of a fallen airplane on the slopes of a Colorado mountain and find the man who caused the crash, but they can't find a white man when he kills a Negro in the South."
- January 24 – Governors of Georgia, Mississippi, South Carolina, and Virginia agree to block the integration of schools.
- February 1 – The Virginia General Assembly passes a resolution that the U.S. Supreme Court integration decision was an "illegal encroachment".
- February 3 – Autherine Lucy is admitted to the University of Alabama. Whites riot for days, and she is suspended. Later, she is expelled for her part in filing legal action against the university.
- February 24 – The policy of Massive Resistance is declared by U.S. Senator Harry F. Byrd Sr. from Virginia.
- February/March – The Southern Manifesto, opposing integration of schools, is drafted and signed by members of the Congressional delegations of Southern states, including 19 members of the Senate and 81 members of the House of Representatives, notably the entire delegations of the states of Alabama, Arkansas, Georgia, Louisiana, Mississippi, South Carolina and Virginia. On March 12, it is released to the press.
- February 13 – Wilmington, Delaware's school board decides to end segregation.
- February 22 – Ninety black leaders in Montgomery, Alabama, are arrested for leading a bus boycott.
- February 29 – The Mississippi Legislature declares the U.S. Supreme Court integration decision "invalid" in that state.
- March 1 – The Alabama Legislature votes to ask for federal funds to deport blacks to northern states.
- March 12 – U.S. Supreme Court orders the University of Florida to admit a black law school applicant "without delay".
- March 22 – King sentenced to fine or jail for instigating Montgomery bus boycott, suspended pending appeal.
- April 23 – U.S. Supreme Court strikes down segregation on buses nationwide.
- May 26 – Circuit Judge Walter B. Jones issues an injunction prohibiting the NAACP from operating in Alabama.
- May 28 – The Tallahassee, Florida, bus boycott begins.
- June 5 – The Alabama Christian Movement for Human Rights (ACMHR) is founded at a mass meeting in Birmingham, Alabama.
- September 2–11 – Tear gas and National Guard used to quell segregationists rioting in Clinton, Tennessee; 12 black students enter high school under Guard protection. Smaller disturbances occur in Mansfield, Texas, and Sturgis, Kentucky.
- September 10 – Two black students are prevented by a mob from entering a junior college in Texarkana, Texas. Schools in Louisville, Kentucky, are successfully desegregated.
- September 12 – Four black children enter an elementary school in Clay, Kentucky, under National Guard protection; white students boycott. The school board bars the four again on September 17.
- October 15 – Integrated athletic or social events are banned in Louisiana.
- November 13 – In Browder v. Gayle, the U.S. Supreme Court strikes down Alabama laws requiring segregation of buses. This ruling, together with the ICC's 1955 ruling in Keys v. Carolina Coach banning "Jim Crow laws" in bus travel among the states, is a landmark in outlawing "Jim Crow" in bus travel. The Browder case was brought and won by noted civil rights attorney Fred Gray.
- December 20 – Federal marshals enforce the ruling to desegregate bus systems in Montgomery.
- December 24 – Blacks in Tallahassee, Florida, begin defying segregation on city buses.
- December 25 – The parsonage in Birmingham, Alabama, occupied by Fred Shuttlesworth, movement leader, is bombed. Shuttlesworth receives only minor injuries.
- December 26 – The ACMHR tests the Browder v. Gayle ruling by riding in the white sections of Birmingham city buses. 22 demonstrators are arrested.
- Mississippi State Sovereignty Commission formed.
- Director J. Edgar Hoover orders the FBI to begin the COINTELPRO program to investigate and disrupt "dissident" groups within the United States.

=== 1957 ===
- February 8 – The Georgia Senate votes to declare the 14th and 15th Amendments to the United States Constitution null and void in that state.
- February 14 – Southern Christian Leadership Conference is formed; Martin Luther King Jr. is named its chairman.
- April 18 – The Florida Senate votes to consider U.S. Supreme Court's desegregation decisions "null and void".
- May 17 – The Prayer Pilgrimage for Freedom in Washington, D.C., at which Martin Luther King Jr. gives his "Give Us the Ballot" speech, is at the time the largest nonviolent demonstration for civil rights.
- September 2 – Orval Faubus, governor of Arkansas, calls out the National Guard to block integration of Little Rock Central High School.
- September 6 – Federal judge orders Nashville public schools to integrate immediately. On September 10, the Hattie Cotton Elementary School bombing happened after the admitting of one black student, following the first day of school.
- September 15 – New York Times reports that in three years since the decision, there has been minimal progress toward integration in four southern states, and no progress at all in seven.
- September 24 – President Dwight Eisenhower federalizes the National Guard and also orders US Army troops to ensure Little Rock Central High School in Arkansas is integrated. Federal and National Guard troops escort the Little Rock Nine.
- September 27 – Civil Rights Act of 1957 signed by President Eisenhower.
- October 7 – The finance minister of Ghana is refused service at a Dover, Delaware, restaurant. President Eisenhower hosts him at the White House to apologize on October 10.
- October 9 – The Florida Legislature votes to close any school if federal troops are sent to enforce integration.
- October 31 – Officers of NAACP were arrested in Little Rock for failing to comply with a new financial disclosure ordinance.
- November 26 – The Texas Legislature votes to close any school where federal troops might be sent.

=== 1958 ===
- June 29 – Bethel Baptist Church in Birmingham, Alabama, is bombed by Ku Klux Klan members.
- June 30 – In NAACP v. Alabama, the U.S. Supreme Court rules that the NAACP was not required to release membership lists to continue operating in the state.
- July – NAACP Youth Council sponsored sit-ins at the lunch counter of a Dockum Drug Store in downtown Wichita, Kansas. After three weeks, the movement successfully gets the store to change its policy and soon afterward all Dockum stores in Kansas are desegregated.
- August 19 – Clara Luper and the NAACP Youth Council conduct the largest successful sit-in to date, on drug store lunch-counters in Oklahoma City. This starts a successful six-year campaign by Luper and the council to desegregate businesses and related institutions in Oklahoma City.
- September 2 – Governor J. Lindsay Almond of Virginia threatens to shut down any school if it is forced to integrate.
- September 4 – The U.S. Justice Department sues under Civil Rights Act to force Terrell County, Georgia, to register blacks to vote.
- September 8 – A Federal judge orders Louisiana State University to desegregate; sixty-nine African-Americans enroll successfully on September 12.
- September 12 – In Cooper v. Aaron the U.S. Supreme Court rules that the states were bound by the Court's decisions. Governor Orval Faubus responds by shutting down all four high schools in Little Rock, and Governor Almond shuts one in Front Royal, Virginia.
- September 18 – Governor Almond closes two more schools in Charlottesville, Virginia, and six in Norfolk on September 27.
- September 29 – The U.S. Supreme Court rules that states may not use evasive measures to avoid desegregation.
- October 8 – A Federal judge in Harrisonburg, Virginia, rules that public money may not be used for segregated private schools.
- October 20 – Thirteen black Alabamians are arrested for sitting in the front of a bus in Birmingham.
- November 28 – Federal court throws out Louisiana law against integrated athletic events.
- December 8 – Voter registration officials in Montgomery refuse to cooperate with US Civil Rights Commission investigation.

=== 1959 ===
- January 9 – One Federal judge throws out segregation on Atlanta, Georgia buses while another orders Montgomery buses to comply.
- January 19 – Federal Appeals court overturns Virginia's closure of the schools in Norfolk; they reopen January 28 with 17 black students.
- April 18 – Martin Luther King Jr. speaks for the integration of schools at a rally of 26,000 at the Lincoln Memorial in Washington, D.C.
- November 20 – Alabama passes laws to limit black voter registration.

== 1960–1968 ==
=== 1960 ===
- February 1 – Four black students sit at the Woolworth's lunch counter in Greensboro, North Carolina, sparking six months of the Greensboro Sit-Ins.
- February 13 – The Nashville, Tennessee Sit-in begins, although the Nashville students, trained by activists and nonviolent teachers James Lawson and Myles Horton, had been doing preliminary groundwork towards the action for two months. The sit-in ends successfully in May.
- February 17 – Alabama grand jury indicts Martin Luther King Jr. for tax evasion.
- February 19 – Virginia Union University students, called the Richmond 34, stage a sit-in at Woolworth's lunch counter in Richmond, Virginia.
- February 22 – The Richmond 34 stage a sit-in the Richmond Room at Thalhimer's department store.
- March 3 – Vanderbilt University expels James Lawson for sit-in participation.
- March 4 – Houston's first sit-in, led by Texas Southern University students, was held at Weingarten supermarket, located at 4110 Almeda in Houston, Texas.
- March 9 – An Appeal for Human Rights was published.
- March 15 – The Atlanta sit-ins begin.
- March 19 – San Antonio becomes the first city to integrate lunch counters.
- April 8 – Weak civil rights bill survives Senate filibuster.
- April 15–17 – The Student Nonviolent Coordinating Committee (SNCC) is formed in Raleigh, North Carolina.
- April 19 – Z. Alexander Looby's home is bombed, with no injuries. Looby, a Nashville civil rights lawyer, was active in the city's ongoing Nashville sit-in for integration of public facilities.
- May – Nashville sit-ins end with business agreements to integrate lunch counters and other public areas.
- May 6 – Civil Rights Act of 1960 signed by President Dwight D. Eisenhower.
- May 28 – William Robert Ming and Hubert Delaney obtain an acquittal of Dr. King from an all-white jury in Alabama.
- June 28 – Bayard Rustin resigns from SCLC after condemnation by Representative Adam Clayton Powell Jr.
- July 31 – Elijah Muhammad calls for an all-black state; membership in Nation of Islam is estimated at 50,000 to 100,000.
- August – Rev. Wyatt Tee Walker replaces Ella Baker as SCLC's Executive Director.
- August – Jacksonville sit-ins begin on August 13, but are met with a clash between Ku Klux Klansmen and an African-American street gang on August 27 reslulting in a day known as Ax Handle Saturday.
- October 19 – King and 50 others arrested at a sit-in at Atlanta's Rich's Department Store.
- October 26 – King's earlier probation was revoked; he is transferred to Reidsville State Prison.
- October 28 – After intervention from Robert F. Kennedy, King is freed on bond.
- November 14 – Ruby Bridges becomes the first African-American child to attend an all-white elementary school in the South (William Frantz Elementary School) following court-ordered integration in New Orleans, Louisiana. This event was portrayed by Norman Rockwell in his 1964 painting The Problem We All Live With.
- December 5 – In Boynton v. Virginia, the U.S. Supreme Court holds that racial segregation in bus terminals is illegal because such segregation violates the Interstate Commerce Act. This ruling, in combination with the Interstate Commerce Commission's 1955 decision in Keys v. Carolina Coach Co., effectively outlaws segregation on interstate buses and at the terminals servicing such buses.

=== 1961 ===
- January 11 – Rioting in Athens, Georgia, over court-ordered admission of first two African-Americans (Hamilton E. Holmes and Charlayne Hunter-Gault) at the University of Georgia leads to their suspension, but they are ordered reinstated.
- January 31 – Members of the Congress of Racial Equality (CORE) and nine students are arrested in Rock Hill, South Carolina, for a sit-in at a McCrory's lunch counter.
- March 6 – President John F. Kennedy issues Executive Order 10925, which establishes a Presidential committee that later becomes the Equal Employment Opportunity Commission.
- May 4 – The first group of Freedom Riders, with the intent of integrating interstate buses, leaves Washington, D.C., by Greyhound bus. The group, organized by the Congress of Racial Equality (CORE), leaves shortly after the U.S. Supreme Court has outlawed segregation in interstate transportation terminals.
- May 6 – Attorney General Robert F. Kennedy delivers a speech to the students of the University of Georgia School of Law in Athens, Georgia, promising to enforce civil rights legislation. It is the Kennedy administration's first formal endorsement of civil rights.
- May 14 – The Freedom Riders' bus is attacked and burned outside of Anniston, Alabama. A mob beats the Freedom Riders upon their arrival in Birmingham. The Freedom Riders are arrested in Jackson, Mississippi, and spend 40 to 60 days in Parchman Penitentiary.
- May 17 – Nashville students, coordinated by Diane Nash, John Lewis, and James Bevel of the Nashville Student Movement, take up the Freedom Ride, signaling the increased involvement of the Student Nonviolent Coordinating Committee (SNCC).
- May 20 – Freedom Riders are assaulted in Montgomery, Alabama, at the Greyhound Bus Station.
- May 21 – King, the Freedom Riders, and congregation of 1,500 at Rev. Ralph Abernathy’s First Baptist Church in Montgomery are besieged by a mob of segregationists; RFK as Attorney General sends federal marshals to protect them.
- May 29 – Attorney General Robert F. Kennedy, citing the 1955 landmark ICC ruling in Keys v. Carolina Coach Company and the U.S. Supreme Court's 1960 decision in Boynton v. Virginia, petitions the ICC to enforce desegregation in interstate travel.
- June–August – U.S. Department of Justice initiates talks with civil rights groups and foundations on beginning Voter Education Project.
- July – SCLC begins citizenship classes; Andrew J. Young hired to direct the program. Bob Moses begins voter registration in McComb, Mississippi. He leaves because of violence.
- September – James Forman becomes SNCC’s Executive Secretary.
- September 23 – The Interstate Commerce Commission, at RFK’s insistence, issues new rules ending discrimination in interstate travel, effective November 1, 1961, six years after the ICC's ruling in Sarah Keys v. Carolina Coach Company.
- September 25 – Voter registration activist and NAACP member Herbert Lee is shot and killed by a white state legislator in McComb, Mississippi.
- November 1 – All interstate buses are required to display a certificate that reads: "Seating aboard this vehicle is without regard to race, color, creed, or national origin, by order of the Interstate Commerce Commission."
- November 1 – SNCC workers Charles Sherrod and Cordell Reagon and nine Chatmon Youth Council members test new ICC rules at Trailways bus station in Albany, Georgia.
- November 17 – SNCC workers help encourage and coordinate black activism in Albany, Georgia, culminating in the founding of the Albany Movement as a formal coalition.
- November 22 – Three high school students from Chatmon's Youth Council were arrested after using "positive actions" by walking into white sections of the Albany bus station.
- November 22 – Albany State College students Bertha Gober and Blanton Hall were arrested after entering the white waiting room of the Albany Trailways station.
- December 10 – Freedom Riders from Atlanta, SNCC leader J. Charles Jones, and Albany State student Bertha Gober are arrested at Albany Union Railway Terminal, sparking mass demonstrations, with hundreds of protesters arrested over the next five days.
- December 11–15 – Five hundred protesters arrested in Albany, Georgia.
- December 15 – King arrives in Albany, Georgia in response to a call from Dr. W. G. Anderson, the leader of the Albany Movement to desegregate public facilities.
- December 16 – King is arrested at an Albany, Georgia demonstration. He is charged with obstructing the sidewalk and parading without a permit.
- December 18 – Albany truce, including a 60-day postponement of King's trial; King leaves town.
- Whitney Young is appointed executive director of the National Urban League and begins expanding its size and mission.
- Black Like Me by John Howard Griffin, a white Southerner who deliberately darkened his skin to pass as a Negro in the Deep South, is published, describing "Jim Crow" segregation for a national audience.
- An amendment to the Library Bill of Rights was passed in 1961 that made clear that an individual's library use should not be denied or abridged because of race, religion, national origin, or political views. Some communities decided to close their doors rather than desegregate.
- From 1934 through November 1961, the Professional Golfers Association of America maintained a "Caucasian-only" membership clause in its bylaws. The clause was removed by amending its constitution.

=== 1962 ===
- January 18–20 – Student protests over sit-in leaders’ expulsions at Baton Rouge’s Southern University, the nation's largest black school, close it down.
- February – Representatives of SNCC, CORE, and the NAACP form the Council of Federated Organizations (COFO). A grant request to fund COFO voter registration activities is submitted to the Voter Education Project (VEP).
- February 26 – Segregated transportation facilities, both interstate and intrastate, ruled unconstitutional by U.S. Supreme Court.
- March – SNCC workers sit-in at US Attorney General Robert F. Kennedy's office to protest jailings in Baton Rouge.
- March 20 – FBI installs wiretaps on NAACP activist Stanley Levison’s office.
- April 3 – Defense Department orders full racial integration of military reserve units, except the National Guard.
- June – SNCC workers establish voter registration projects in rural southwest Georgia.
- July 10 – August 28 SCLC renews protests in Albany; MLK in jail July 10–12 and July 27 – August 10.
- August 31 – Fannie Lou Hamer attempts to register to vote in Indianola, Mississippi.
- September 9 – Two black churches used by SNCC for voter registration meetings are burned in Sasser, Georgia.
- September 20 – James Meredith is barred from becoming the first black student to enroll at the University of Mississippi.
- September 30 – October 1 – U.S. Supreme Court Justice Hugo Black orders James Meredith admitted to Ole Miss.; he enrolls and a white riot in Oxford ensues. French photographer Paul Guihard (the only journalist murdered during the Civil Rights Era) and Oxford resident Ray Gunter are killed.
- October – Leflore County, Mississippi, supervisors cut off surplus food distribution in retaliation against voter drive.
- October 23 – FBI begins Communist Infiltration (COMINFIL) investigation of SCLC.
- November 20 – Attorney General Kennedy authorizes FBI wiretap on Stanley Levison’s home telephone.
- November 20 – President Kennedy upholds 1960 presidential campaign promises to eliminate housing segregation by signing Executive Order 11063 banning segregation in Federally funded housing.

=== 1963 ===
- January 14 – Incoming Alabama governor George Wallace calls for "segregation now, segregation tomorrow, segregation forever" in his inaugural address.
- March 28 – The Rome sit-ins occur.
- April 3 – May 10 – The Birmingham campaign, organized by the Southern Christian Leadership Conference (SCLC) and the Alabama Christian Movement for Human Rights, protests segregation in Birmingham by daily mass demonstrations.
- April – Mary Lucille Hamilton, Field Secretary for the Congress of Racial Equality, refuses to answer a judge in Gadsden, Alabama, until she is addressed by the honorific "Miss". At the time, it was the southern custom to address white people by honorifics and people of color by their first names. Jailed for contempt of court Hamilton refused to pay bail. The case Hamilton v. Alabama is filed by the NAACP. It reached the U.S. Supreme Court, which ruled in 1964 that courts must address persons of color with the same courtesy extended to whites.
- April 7 – Ministers John Thomas Porter, Nelson H. Smith, and A. D. King lead a group of 2,000 marchers to protest the jailing of movement leaders in Birmingham.
- April 12 – King is arrested in Birmingham for "parading without a permit".
- April 16 – King's "Letter from Birmingham Jail" is completed.
- April 23 – CORE activist William L. Moore is murdered in Gadsden, Alabama.
- May 2–4 – Birmingham's juvenile court is inundated with African-American children and teenagers arrested after James Bevel, SCLC's Director of Direct Action and Director of Nonviolent Education, launches his "D-Day" youth march. The actions span three days to become the Birmingham Children's Crusade where over a thousand children and students are arrested. The images of fire hoses and police dogs turned on the protesters are televised around the world.
- May 9–10 – The Children's Crusade lays the groundwork for the terms of a negotiated truce on Thursday, May 9, which puts an end to mass demonstrations in return for rolling back segregation laws and practices. Dr. King and Reverend Fred Shuttlesworth announce the settlement terms on Friday, May 10, only after King holds out to orchestrate the release of thousands of jailed demonstrators with bail money from Harry Belafonte and Robert Kennedy.
- May 11–12 – A double bombing in Birmingham, probably organized by the KKK with help from local police, precipitates rioting, police retaliation, the intervention of state troopers, and finally mobilization of federal troops.
- May 13 – In United States of America and Interstate Commerce Commission v. the City of Jackson, Mississippi, et al., the United States Court of Appeals Fifth Circuit rules the city's attempt to circumvent laws desegregating interstate transportation facilities by posting sidewalk signs outside Greyhound, Trailways and Illinois Central terminals reading "Waiting Room for White Only — By Order Police Department" and "Waiting Room for Colored Only – By Order Police Department" to be unlawful.
- May 24 – A group of Black leaders (assembled by James Baldwin) meets with Attorney General Robert F. Kennedy to discuss race relations.
- May 29 – Violence escalates at NAACP picket of Philadelphia construction site.
- May 30 – Police attack Florida A&M anti-segregation demonstrators with tear gas; arrest 257, in Tallahassee, Florida.
- June 9 – Fannie Lou Hamer is among several SNCC workers badly beaten by police in the Winona, Mississippi, jail after their bus stops there.
- June 11 – "The Stand in the Schoolhouse Door": Alabama Governor George Wallace stands in front of a schoolhouse door at the University of Alabama in an attempt to stop desegregation by the enrollment of two black students, Vivian Malone and James Hood. Wallace stands aside after being confronted by federal marshals, Deputy Attorney General Nicholas Katzenbach, and the Alabama National Guard. Later in life, he apologizes for his opposition to racial integration.
- June 11 – President Kennedy makes his historic civil rights address, promising a bill to Congress the next week. About civil rights for "Negroes", in his speech, he asks for "the kind of equality of treatment which we would want for ourselves."
- June 12 – NAACP field secretary Medgar Evers is assassinated in Jackson, Mississippi. (His murderer is convicted in 1994.)
- Summer – 80,000 blacks quickly register to vote in Mississippi by a test project to show their desire to participate in the political system.
- June 19 – President Kennedy sends Congress (H. Doc. 124, 88th Cong., 1st session.) his proposed Civil Rights Act. White leaders in business and philanthropy gather at the Carlyle Hotel to raise initial funds for the Council on United Civil Rights Leadership
- August 28 – Gwynn Oak Amusement Park in Northwest Baltimore County, Maryland is desegregated.
- August 28 – March on Washington for Jobs and Freedom is held. Martin Luther King Jr. gives his "I Have a Dream" speech.
- September 10 – Birmingham, Alabama City Schools are integrated by National Guardsmen under orders from President Kennedy.
- September 15 – 16th Street Baptist Church bombing kills four young girls, killing of Johnny Robinson and Virgil Lamar Ware happened later that day in Birmingham . That same day, in response to the killings, James Bevel and Diane Nash begin the Alabama Project, which will later develop as the Selma Voting Rights Movement.

=== 1964 ===
- All year – The Alabama Voting Rights Project continues organizing led by James Bevel, Diane Nash, and James Orange. Although Bevel is SCLC's Director of Direct Action and Nonviolent Education, the organization itself is not yet participating.
- All year – Throughout Mississippi approximately fifty Freedom Libraries are established and run by librarian volunteers.
- January 23 – Twenty-fourth Amendment abolishes the poll tax for Federal elections.
- March 30 – Hamilton v. Alabama, 376 U.S. 650 (1964), is a United States Supreme Court case in which the court held that an African-American woman, Mary Hamilton, was entitled to be greeted with the same courteous forms of address which were customarily and solely reserved for whites in the Southern United States, and that calling a black person by their first name in a formal context was "a form of racial discrimination".
- April – The Chester school protests culminate in violent clashes with police in Chester, Pennsylvania.
- Summer – Freedom Summer – movement for voter education and registration in the Mississippi. The Mississippi Freedom Democratic Party was founded and elected an alternative slate of delegates for the national convention, as blacks are still officially disenfranchised.
- June 9 – Bloody Tuesday – peaceful marchers beaten, arrested, and tear-gassed by Tuscaloosa, Alabama, police on a peaceful march to the County Courthouse to protest whites-only restroom signs and drinking fountains
- June 21 – Murders of Chaney, Goodman, and Schwerner, three civil rights workers disappear from Philadelphia, Mississippi, later to be found murdered and buried in an earthen dam.
- June 28 – Organization of Afro-American Unity is founded by Malcolm X, lasts until his death.
- July 2 – Civil Rights Act of 1964 signed, banning discrimination based on "race, color, religion, sex or national origin" in employment practices and public accommodations.
- August – Congress passes the Economic Opportunity Act which, among other things, provides federal funds for legal representation of Native Americans in both civil and criminal suits. This allows the ACLU and the American Bar Association to represent Native Americans in cases that later win them additional civil rights.
- August – The Mississippi Freedom Democratic Party delegates challenge the seating of all-white Mississippi representatives at the Democratic national convention.
- December 10 – King is awarded the Nobel Peace Prize, the youngest person so honored.
- December 14 – In Heart of Atlanta Motel v. United States, the U.S. Supreme Court upholds the Civil Rights Act of 1964.

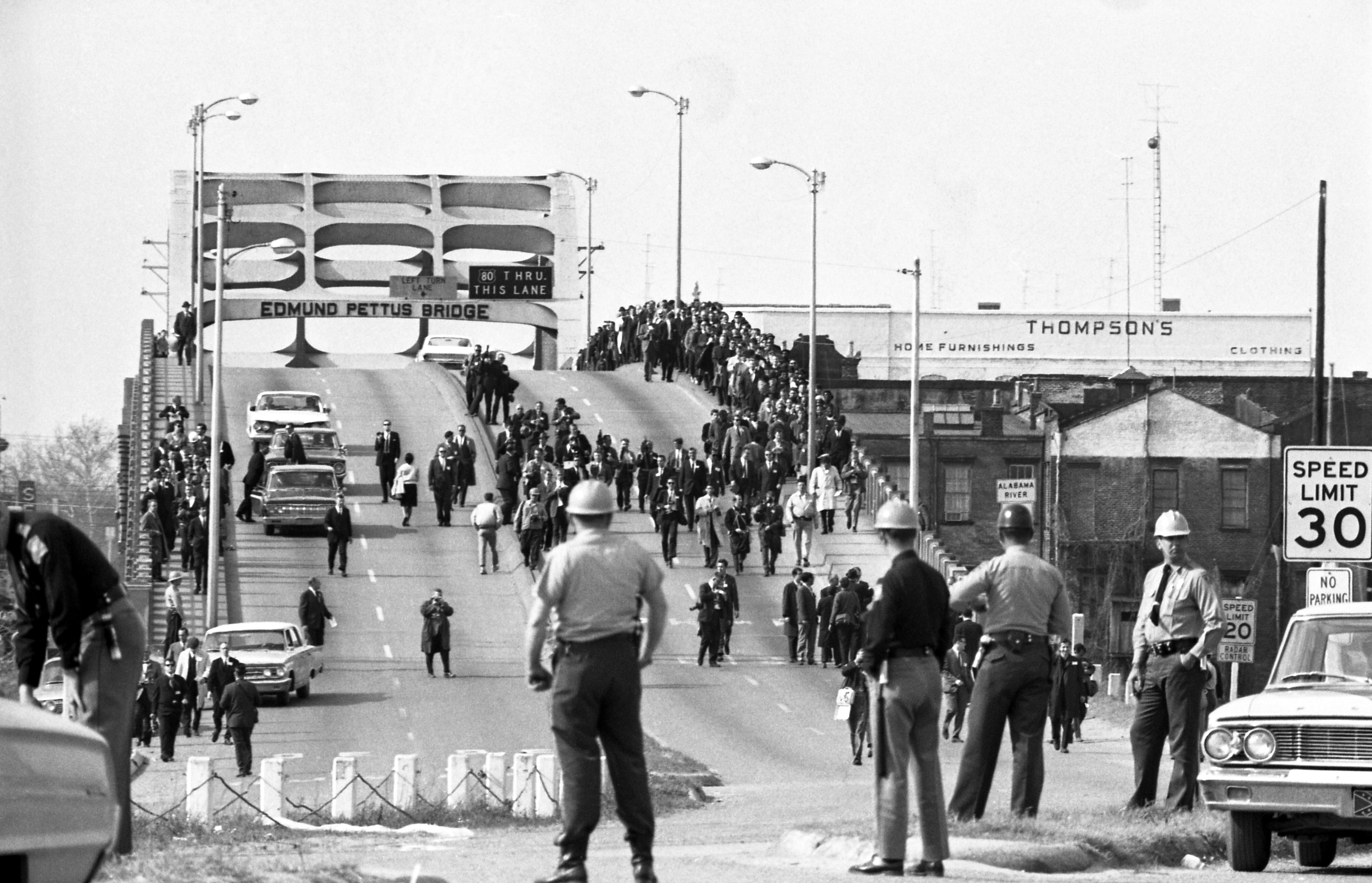
The Edmund Pettus Bridge on "Bloody Sunday" in 1965.

=== 1965 ===
- February 18 – After a peaceful nighttime protest march in Marion, Alabama, state troopers turn off the streetlights, break up the march, and one trooper shoots Jimmie Lee Jackson. Jackson dies on February 26. His death helped inspire the Selma to Montgomery marches. Though not prosecuted at the time, James Bonard Fowler is indicted for Jackson's murder in 2007.
- February 21 – Malcolm X is assassinated in Manhattan, New York, probably by three members of the Nation of Islam.
- March 7 – Bloody Sunday: Civil rights workers in Selma, Alabama, begin the Selma to Montgomery march but are attacked and stopped by a massive Alabama State trooper and police blockade as they cross the Edmund Pettus Bridge into Dallas County. Many marchers are seriously injured, including SNCC leader John Lewis and long-time major Selma activist Amelia Boynton. This march, initiated and organized by James Bevel, becomes the visual symbol of the Selma Voting Rights Movement.
- March 9 – Joined by clergy from all over the country who responded to his urgent appeals for reinforcements in Selma, King led a second attempt to cross the Pettus Bridge. Although amassed law enforcement personnel are ordered to draw back when the protesters near the foot of the bridge on the other side, King responds by telling the marchers to turn around, and they return to Brown Chapel nearby. He obeys a just-minted federal order prohibiting the group from walking the highway to Montgomery.
- March 11 – Rev. James Reeb, a white Unitarian minister who had heeded King's call for clergy to come to Selma, is beaten by Klansmen. Reeb dies of his injuries. Reeb's murder shocks the nation.
- March 15 – President Lyndon Johnson uses the phrase "We Shall Overcome" in a speech before Congress to urge passage of the voting rights bill.
- March 21 – Participants in the third and successful Selma to Montgomery march stepped off on a five-day 54-mile march to Montgomery, Alabama's capitol.
- March 25 – After the successful completion of the Selma to Montgomery March, and after King has delivered his "How Long, Not Long" speech on the steps of the state capitol, a white volunteer, Viola Liuzzo, is shot and killed by KKK members in Alabama, one of whom was an FBI informant.
- June 2 – Black deputy sheriff Oneal Moore is murdered in Varnado, Louisiana.
- July 2 – Equal Employment Opportunity Commission begins operations.
- August 6 – Voting Rights Act of 1965 is signed by President Johnson. It provides for federal oversight and enforcement of voter registration in states and individual voting districts with a history of discriminatory tests and underrepresented populations. It prohibits discriminatory practices preventing African Americans and other minorities from registering and voting, and electoral systems diluting their vote.
- August 11–15 – Following the accusations of mistreatment and police brutality by the Los Angeles Police Department towards the city's African-American community, Watts riots erupt in South Central Los Angeles which last over five days. Over 34 are killed, 1,032 injured, 3,438 arrested, and cost over $40 million in property damage.
- September – Raylawni Branch and Gwendolyn Elaine Armstrong become the first African-American students to attend the University of Southern Mississippi.
- September 24 – President Johnson signs Executive Order 11246 requiring Equal Employment Opportunity by federal contractors.

=== 1966 ===
- January 10 – NAACP local chapter president Vernon Dahmer is injured by a bomb in Hattiesburg, Mississippi. He dies the next day.
- June 5 – James Meredith begins a solitary March Against Fear from Memphis, Tennessee, to Jackson, Mississippi. Shortly after starting, he is shot with a birdshot and injured. Civil rights leaders and organizations rally and continue the march leading to, on June 16, Stokely Carmichael first using the slogan Black power in a speech. Twenty-five thousand marchers entered the capital.
- June 10 – The murder of Ben Chester White led to the KKK being legally held responsible for one of its member's action.
- Summer – The Chicago Open Housing Movement, led by Martin Luther King Jr., James Bevel and Al Raby, includes a large rally, marches, and demands to Mayor Richard J. Daley and the City of Chicago which are discussed in a movement-ending Summit Conference.
- October – Black Panther Party founded by Huey P. Newton and Bobby Seale in Oakland, California.

=== 1967 ===
- April 4 – King delivers "Beyond Vietnam" speech, calling for the defeat of "the giant triplets of racism, materialism, and militarism".
- June 12 – In Loving v. Virginia, the U.S. Supreme Court rules that prohibiting interracial marriage is unconstitutional.
- In the trial of accused killers in the murders of Chaney, Goodman, and Schwerner, the jury convicts 7 of 18 accused men. Conspirator Edgar Ray Killen is later convicted in 2005.
- June – August – Over 150 communities burn during the Long, Hot Summer of 1967. The largest and deadliest riots of the summer take place in Newark, New Jersey, and Detroit with 26 fatalities reported in Newark and 43 people losing their lives in the Motor City.
- October 2 – Thurgood Marshall is sworn in as the first African-American justice of the United States Supreme Court.

=== 1968 ===
- February 1 – Two Memphis sanitation workers are killed in the line of duty, exacerbating labor tensions.
- February 8 – The Orangeburg Massacre occurs on the campus of South Carolina State College during a university protest in Orangeburg, South Carolina. This marked the first instance of police killing student protestors at an American university.
- February 12 – First day of the (wildcat) Memphis sanitation strike.
- April 3 – King returns to Memphis; delivers his "I've Been to the Mountaintop" speech in support of the workers.
- April 4 – Assassination of Martin Luther King Jr. in Memphis, Tennessee.
- April 4–8 and one in May 1968 – Riots break out in Chicago, Washington, D.C., Baltimore, Louisville, Kansas City, and more than 100 U.S. cities in response to the assassination of Martin Luther King Jr.
- April 11 – Civil Rights Act of 1968 is signed. The Fair Housing Act is Title VIII of this Civil Rights Act, and bans discrimination in the sale, rental, and financing of housing. The law is passed following a series of Open Housing campaigns throughout the urban North, the most significant being the 1966 Chicago Open Housing Movement and the organized events in Milwaukee during 1967–68. In both cities, angry white mobs had attacked nonviolent protesters.
- May 12 – Poor People's Campaign encamps on the National Mall in Washington, D.C., for six weeks
- October 16 – In Mexico City, African-American athletes Tommie Smith and John Carlos raise their fists in a black power salute after winning, respectively, the gold and bronze medals in the Olympic men's 200 meters.
- December 23 – In Powe v. Miles, a federal court holds that the portions of private colleges that are funded by public money are subject to the Civil Rights Act.

== See also ==
- Civil rights movement in popular culture
- African-American history
- Timeline of African-American history
- History of civil rights in the United States
- Civil right acts in the United States
- Civil rights movement (1865–1896)
- Civil rights movement (1896–1954)
- Long civil rights movement
- Racism against African Americans
- Racism in the United States
- Runyon v. McCrary (1976), bars segregation in private schools whereas Brown only bars segregation in public schools
