= Rome sit-ins =

American civil rights protest in Rome, Georgia (1963)

- Part of the sit-in movement in the civil rights movement
- Date: March 28, 1963
- Location: Rome, Georgia, United States; 34°15′19″N 85°10′16″W
- Caused by: Racial segregation
- Goals: Desegregation of racially segregated facilities
- Methods: Sit-ins
- Result: Public facilities desegregated by the end of the year

Parties
Protestors from Rome Colored / Main High School	Several private businesses, including: Enloe Drug Store; G. C. Murphy; Redford's Variety Store; Walgreens

Casualties
- Arrested: 62

The Rome sit-ins were held on March 28, 1963, in Rome, Georgia, United States, to protest racial segregation in the city. The protest involved over 100 African American students from a local high school, who targeted several businesses in downtown Rome that discriminated against black people. 62 of the protestors were arrested, with many convicted of violating city ordinances. According to historian Stephen Tuck, by the end of the year, public facilities in the city were desegregated, thanks to the protest and the influence of the local chapter of the Georgia Council on Human Relations. Private facilities would be desegregated the following year after the passage of the Civil Rights Act of 1964.

== Background ==
=== Rome in the mid-20th century ===
According to historian Stephen Tuck, during the mid-20th century, the city of Rome, Georgia, "had a reputation for more tolerant race relations" than most of the other locales in the state. Concerning this, the Pittsburgh Courier, an African American newspaper, called the north Georgia city "one of the better cities in Georgia" in a 1951 report. Following the 1945 court case King v. Chapman, city officials actively encouraged African Americans to register to vote and appointed several black people as poll workers. The following year, two African Americans were appointed as officers in the city's police department, and in 1951, M. D. Whatley, an African American school teacher, ran for a position on the local school board without issue.

Despite this, there were several incidents of violence perpetrated against African Americans in the area during this time, including a 1940 lynching of two black people by a mob of White Americans. By that time, the NAACP's local chapter in Rome had become largely inactive, mirroring the state of the organization across all of Georgia at the time. According to Tuck, black activism in the city was largely moribund by the early 1950s, as reflected in Whatley's loss in his election, where he received less than a third of the votes from the registered African Americans in the city. Per Tuck, Whatley would have easily won election had he had an active black voting bloc supporting him. Additionally, the city was subject to a system of racial segregation.

=== Sit-in movement ===
In mid-March 1960, activists in Atlanta and Savannah initiated protests as part of the larger sit-in movement, which aimed to desegregate racially segregated facilities. Over the next few years, several cities in Georgia experienced civil rights protests. By September 1961, over 7,000 Georgians had engaged in protest activities, with over 292 being arrested for their actions. In Rome, desegregation efforts were spearheaded by the city's local chapter of the Georgia Council on Human Relations, which by 1963 had grown to over 180 members. As a result of the council's work, Berry College desegregated a year before the rest of the universities in the state, and the city's Carnegie Library desegregated in early March 1963.

In 1963, students at Rome Colored / Main High School began to plan for a sit-in protest against segregated businesses in downtown Rome, including several restaurants that either outright refused to serve black people or otherwise discriminated against them. Student activists were organized by some of the teachers, who did not officially support the protestors out of fear of being fired. Discussing the protest movement in 2007, the Rome News-Tribune noted that the protestors faced opposition from the city's black religious leaders and from their parents. Additionally, several students were asked not to participate in the protesting, as organizers were worried that they would jeopardize the nonviolent nature of the protest. The student activists were largely inspired by other protests that had occurred in the southern United States during the civil rights movement, such as the Montgomery bus boycott and the Greensboro sit-ins. According to Tuck, the sit-ins would be the first civil rights protests held in northwest Georgia.

== Protest and arrests ==
On March 28, 1963, over 100 African American high school students sought service at several segregated businesses in downtown Rome. Specific businesses included Enloe Drug Store, G. C. Murphy, Redford's Variety Store, and Walgreens. The students divided into groups of about 20 students each, with one of two leaders overseeing each group. Five protestors at a time would enter the targeted establishments, and when those individuals were removed from the business, another group of five would enter to replace them. According to one of the protestors, they operated in groups of five so that, in the event of an arrest, it would take at least two police cars to transport everyone in the group. At one of the lunch counters that were targeted, waitresses responded by removing the tops from the counter's stools.

Shortly after the first sit-ins, a large police presence formed in downtown. Ultimately, 62 students were arrested for their involvement in the protest, which was the maximum amount of people that the local jail could hold. The organizers had been aware that arrests were likely, and they instructed the protestors to carry money and reading materials with them in case they were arrested. Several of the arrested were placed in the drunk tank alongside a drunk woman. During their imprisonment, the police denied the arrested visitations, including by family members. During the day, the police closed the windows and increased the heat, while at night the windows were opened and the air conditioning was turned on. During their incarceration, the students attempted to maintain their morale by singing songs, such as a rendition of "Go Down Moses" with lyrics that substituted the pharaoh in the song for the chief of police. Prior to their hearing, they recited the Lord's Prayer and sang "Lift Every Voice and Sing". The students remained incarcerated for several days, with one student spending 13 days in jail.

Horace Ward served as a legal counsel for many of the arrested in their subsequent trials, where most of them were convicted of violating city ordinances. These cases were held at the Rome Municipal Court. Four cases were appealed to the Georgia Superior Court, with Ward arguing on behalf of the protestors, though the court affirmed the convictions handed down by the lower court. The cases were one of several civil rights cases undertaken by Ward during the early 1960s.

== Aftermath and legacy ==
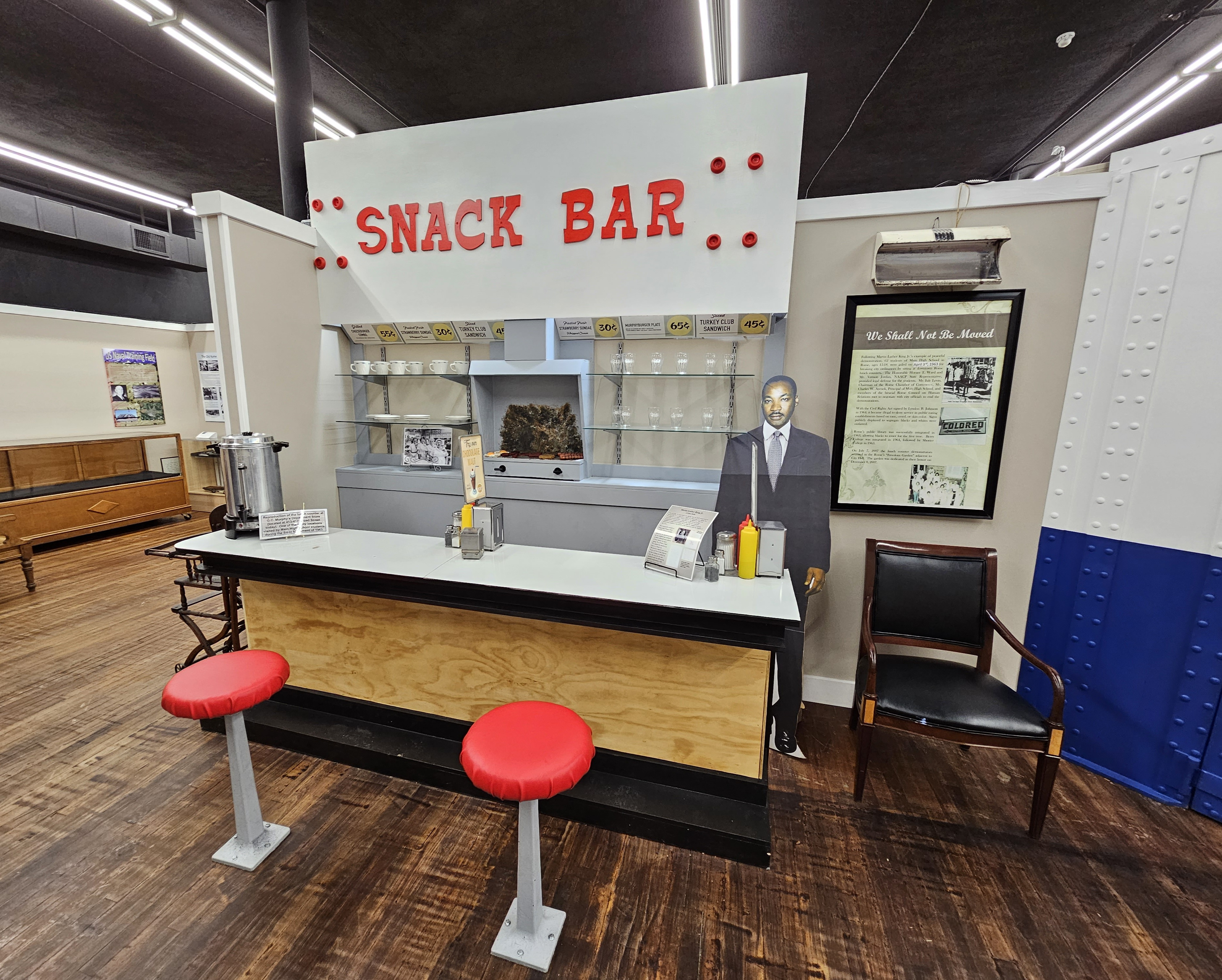
A replica of the lunch counter from the G. C. Murphy store, on display at the Rome Area History Museum (pictured 2023)

According to Tuck, thanks to the protests and the influence of the Georgia Council on Human Relations chapter, public facilities in Rome were desegregated by the end of the year. Discussing the events in 2001, Tuck called the sit-ins "particularly effective", further saying, "Rome rivaled Brunswick as the city that made the smoothest transition to downtown segregation in Georgia". Further desegregation efforts occurred the following year with the passage of the Civil Rights Act of 1964 on July 2, which further desegregated private establishments in the city, such as movie theaters and restaurants.

In July 2007, the Rome Area History Museum hosted a round table with several of the protestors who had been involved in the 1963 sit-ins, with plans to use a video of the discussions in an exhibit on the civil rights movement in Rome. By 2020, the museum's civil rights exhibit featured a replica of the lunch counter from G. C. Murphy. Also in July 2007, as part of a high school reunion, a reenactment play of the sit-ins was held at the Rome City Auditorium. The play, titled It Had to Happen, was based on essays written by several protestors who had been involved in the event.

== See also ==
- History of Georgia (U.S. state)
- Timeline of the civil rights movement

== Sources ==
- Clark, Jake (July 6, 2007). "Museum saves civil rights storie". Rome News-Tribune. ISSN 1060-4049. OCLC 21967923. Archived from the original on February 27, 2026.
- Daniels, Maurice C. (2001). Horace T. Ward: Desegregation of the University of Georgia, Civil Rights Advocacy, and Jurisprudence. Foreword by Horace T. Ward. Atlanta: Clark Atlanta University Press. ISBN 978-0-9668555-3-1. OCLC 48498558.
- Morley, Olivia (July 7, 2020). "Rome Area History Center reopens, plans to continue renovating exhibits throughout the year". Rome News-Tribune. ISSN 1060-4049. OCLC 21967923. Archived from the original on July 8, 2020.
- Perry, Imani (2018). May We Forever Stand: A History of the Black National Anthem. Chapel Hill, North Carolina: University of North Carolina Press. ISBN 978-1-4696-3861-4. OCLC 1021882241.
- "School reunion to feature re-enactment of civil rights sit-i". Rome News-Tribune. July 1, 2007a. ISSN 1060-4049. OCLC 21967923. Archived from the original on February 27, 2026.
- "Play rehearsal for "It Had To Happen". Rome News-Tribune. July 6, 2007b. ISSN 1060-4049. OCLC 21967923. Archived from the original on February 27, 2026.
- Samuel, Willie Mae (January 2, 2021). "It had to happen". Rome News-Tribune. ISSN 1060-4049. OCLC 21967923. Archived from the original on January 17, 2021.
- Samuel, Willie Mae (March 2, 2024a). "Willie Mae Samuel: Too Many Things Were Out of Kilter". Rome News-Tribune. ISSN 1060-4049. OCLC 21967923. Archived from the original on March 2, 2024.
- Samuel, Willie Mae (April 27, 2024b). "Willie Mae Samuel: 1963 RomeGA Students Speak: Mattie K and Mary H.". Rome News-Tribune. ISSN 1060-4049. OCLC 21967923. Archived from the original on April 27, 2024.
- Tuck, Stephen G. N. (2001). Beyond Atlanta: The Struggle for Racial Equality in Georgia, 1940–1980. Athens, Georgia: University of Georgia Press. ISBN 978-0-8203-2265-0. OCLC 45438287.
- Wagne, Diane (July 7, 2007). "Civil rights sit-in play fills City Auditoriu". Rome News-Tribune. ISSN 1060-4049. OCLC 21967923. Archived from the original on February 27, 2026.
