= Glenwood Elementary School =

Glenwood Elementary School may refer to:

- Glenwood Elementary School (British Columbia)
- Glenwood Elementary School (California)
- Glenwood Elementary School (Georgia)
- Glenwood Elementary School (Massachusetts)
- Glenwood Elementary School (North Carolina)
