= James Andrew Felton =

Civil rights activist

James Andrew Felton (July 6, 1919 – October 6, 1994) was an educator, counselor, community leader, and author in northeastern North Carolina. His decades of activism exemplified black organizing during the "long civil rights movement" through efforts to ensure equal rights for African Americans, merge North Carolina’s segregated teacher associations, improve housing conditions in the state’s Black Belt, and preserve black history.

== Personal life ==
James A. Felton was born in 1919 on the "Old Harrell Plantation" in Hertford Township, Perquimans County, North Carolina. His parents were Eugene and Virgilla Felton. On August 3, 1947, he married Annie Mary Vaughan in Baltimore, Maryland. Vaughan was a graduate of Elizabeth City State Teachers College (now Elizabeth City State University) and taught for many years at C. S. Brown School in Winton, North Carolina. The Feltons had six children: James Andrew, Jr., Keith, Maria, Sharon, Michele, and Camilla.

== Military Service ==
In 1943, Felton was part of the first cohort of black trainees for the United States Marine Corps, which was all-white until President Franklin D. Roosevelt issued Executive Order 8802 banning racial discrimination in national defense departments, agencies, and industries. Felton trained at Montford Point near Jacksonville, North Carolina, and became a drill instructor. He was honorably discharged in December 1945.

== Education ==
Felton began his studies at the Hampton Institute (now Hampton University). After military service, he used support from the GI Bill to complete his bachelor of science degree in education at Elizabeth City State Teachers College in 1947. He later received a master's degree from North Carolina College at Durham (North Carolina Central University).

== Career ==
Felton worked as a public school educator in Greene County and Hertford County for 20 years. Felton chaired groups in the North Carolina Teachers Association, the state’s African American teacher association and he drafted and promoted a merger plan with the state’s white teacher association, the North Carolina Education Association. Finalized in 1970, the merger created the current state teacher organization, the North Carolina Association of Educators.

Felton was a licensed and ordained preacher who served as an assistant pastor in the Mill Neck Baptist Church and the Oxley Hill Baptist Church.

== Civil Rights and Community Organizing ==
Felton was a longtime member of the Hertford County NAACP and he participated in the August 28, 1963 March on Washington for Jobs and Freedom. During the 1960s, Felton worked with members of the black and white communities to integrate schools and facilities, reduce unemployment, increase voter registration, and improve housing conditions and water infrastructure.

Drawing on his experience in the Marines, Felton wrote a novel, Fruits of Enduring Faith, published in 1965. In it, a white World War II veteran—whose life was saved by a black soldier he served with—educates his family on the contributions and sacrifices that African Americans have made throughout U.S. history and joins the civil rights movement. As George S. Schuyler described it in the Pittsburgh Courier, the book "dramatizes the human issues lying behind the passage of the Civil Rights Act of 1964."

Felton co-founded the People's Program on Poverty (PPOP), a grassroots and community action program (CAP) that operated within four counties in northeastern North Carolina between the Roanoke and Chowan rivers: Bertie, Halifax, Hertford, and Northampton. On February 15, 1967, Felton led the PPOP delegation to Washington, D.C., and testified to the National Advisory Commission on Rural Poverty about conditions in the four-county area and the difficulties PPOP faced from local white elites. After it received funding from the North Carolina Fund, Felton served as the organization’s housing director and as executive director.

Felton was invited by Dr. Robert C. Weaver, the first U.S. Secretary of Housing and Urban Development (HUD), to travel to Washington, D.C., to attend a War on Poverty Conference in March 1967. Felton used his knowledge of federal housing policy to organize local workshops and help more than 100 residents in northeastern North Carolina access programs for low-interest mortgages and home improvement loans. Felton founded the first Family Training Center in the United States.

== Cultural Contribution ==
Felton helped create the C. S. Brown Regional Cultural Arts Center and Museum in Winton, North Carolina. Constructed with support from the Rosenwald Fund in 1926, Brown Hall faced a demolition plan in 1980. Felton rallied local supporters and alumni to convert the cherished school—founded by Dr. Calvin Scott Brown in 1886—into an art center and museum. C. S. Brown School Auditorium was listed on the National Register of Historic Places in 1985.
