= Public institution (United States) =

A public institution is a juristic person in the United States which is backed through public funds and controlled by the state. Typically a public institution will have a board of trustees who govern the institution and the members of the board are public officials who are appointed by the state (typically a person in the executive branch such as a state governor) for a fixed term of years. When public institutions are created, they lead to many other establishments such as new laws.

== Description ==
In U.S. law, whether an institution is public or private determines how bound the institution is to the requirements for civil rights to which the state must conform (see also Equal Protection Clause). A public institution is required to conform to the same requirements as the state for constitutional questions meaning that the U.S. Constitution, especially the Bill of Rights, applies to the institution as does the constitution of the state in which the public institution resides. Court cases involving public institutions are within the jurisdiction of the U.S. Federal Court System.

In U.S. law, there are five major factors used by courts to determine if an institution is a public or a private institution and whether the court has jurisdiction in the case (see Powe v. Miles for an example).

- what amount of control does the state have in the governance of the institution
- what amount of state funding is used to support the institution's activities
- what amount of the institution's property is owned by the state
- does the institution have tax-free status
- is there a contract between the state and the institution

== External articles ==
- United States, The Federal and state constitutions, colonial charters, and other organic laws of the state, territories, and colonies now or heretofore forming the United States of America. Govt. Print. Off., 1909.
- Frank Johnson Goodnow, The principles of the administrative law of the United States. G.P. Putnam's Sons, 1905.
- Rudolf Sohm, The Institutes; a textbook of the history and system of Roman private law. 1907.
- Dugald J. Bannatyne, Handbook of republican institutions in the United States of America: based upon federal and state laws. W. Blackwood and sons, 1887
