= Frances Freeborn Pauley =

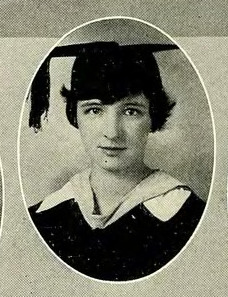
- Frances Freeborn (later Pauley), from the 1927 yearbook of Agnes Scott College
- Born: Frances Freeborn; September 11, 1905; Wadsworth, Ohio, U.S.
- Died: February 16, 2003 (aged 97); Lancaster, Pennsylvania, U.S.
- Education: Agnes Scott College
- Spouse: William Crooks Pauley (May 25, 1930)
- Children: Joan Pauley Lamb Marylin Pauley Beittel
- Parents: William Freeborn (father); Josephine Andrews Freeborn (mother)

Frances Freeborn Pauley (September 11, 1905 – February 16, 2003) was a southern civil rights activist in Georgia, who battled against racial injustice and discrimination throughout her life. Due to her actions in the civil rights movement, she led to the eventual desegregation and integration of African Americans in the south.

== Early life and education ==
Pauley was born on September 11, 1905, in Wadsworth Ohio. She was born to William Freeborn and Josephine Andrews Freeborn. Pauley's only sibling was her brother William Elbridge Freeborn. In 1908 at the age of three, Pauley moved with her family to Decatur, Georgia in DeKalb County. Pauley attended Decatur High School for her primary education, following onto Agnes Scott College. Pauley graduated in 1927 with a degree of mathematics. At that time, due to the upbringing in both the Mid-west and the South, Pauley adopted a dual identity growing up.

== Activism ==
Pauley began to work in public service during the Great Depression. She formed a church group with other women that worked to provide food and services to the impoverished citizens of DeKalb County. Her organization raised money to provide lunches to all students in public schools in the county. Pauley continued to work to provide services for those that did not have access to basic care, setting up a medical clinic in Decatur. Pauley was a prominent voice in her community in advocating for racial integration. As president of the League of Women Voters she repealed bylaws that restricted membership to only white women.

Pauley gathered support from other politicians and activists in the area, including Martin Luther King Jr. and became the executive director of the Georgia Council on Human relations in 1960 where she continued to work for further integration of schools and began to advocate for community organizations that encouraged participation and cooperation between citizens of differing races.

Pauley was then appointed to the U.S. Department of Health, Education and Welfare in 1968 where she worked and advocated for the continued desegregation and protection of schools in Georgia and across the country. Pauley served in the Department of Health, Education and Welfare until 1973 when officially retired.

== Legacy ==
Throughout her activism career, Pauley held many positions which resulted in her having a crucial role in the civil rights movement. These positions include: President of the DeKalb County League of Women Voters, President of the Georgia chapter of the League of Women Voters, Head of Georgia Council on Human Relations, and working as an administrator in Office of Civil Rights of the U.S. Department of Health, Education and Welfare. The culmination of these positions resulted in Frances Freeborn Pauley cementing her legacy as an influential individual in the southern civil rights movement. In every position which she held, Pauley attempted to promote equality and actively attempted to integrate African Americans into the structure of the institution. She was posthumously inducted into the Georgia Women of Achievement in 2015.

== Personal life ==
After Graduation from Agnes Scott College in 1927 with a degree in mathematics, Pauley proceeded to assist in theatrical productions throughout DeKalb County as well as Atlanta, Georgia. Whilst directing a play at St. Philip's Episcopal Church, Frances Freeborn Pauley met a landscape architect by the name of William Crooks Pauley. This encounter resulted in their eventual marriage on May 25, 1930. Frances and William Pauley remained married throughout the extent of their lives and served as the parents to two daughters, Joan Pauley Lamb, and Marylin Pauley Beittel.
