= Trinity High School (Georgia) =

American former high school

- Trinity High School

Location
- 410 West Trinity Place; Decatur, Georgia 30030-3393; United States; 33°46′24″N 84°18′04″W

Information
- Type: Public High School
- Established: 1902
- Status: Merged into Decatur High School (Georgia) in 1967
- Closed: 1967
- School district: City Schools of Decatur
- Principal: Albert J. Martin
- Grades: 9–12
- Mascot: Bulldog

Trinity High School was a high school in Decatur, Georgia, United States. The school was City Schools of Decatur's African American high school counterpart to the segregated Decatur High School.

== History ==
In 1902, the first school for African Americans was opened in Decatur. The school was located within Decatur, in the primarily black neighborhood Beacon Hill. The initial school was run from within the local Presbyterian Church and led by a church Reverend.

Later in 1913, due to increasing demand, the school was relocated and a new brick building was constructed for the school. With its new location on Herring Street, the school was renamed as the Herring Street school. The school had a scarce amount of resources available. Teachers formed a Teacher Club in order to provide college tuition scholarships for underprivileged students.

From 1913 to 1928, the new school taught children up until 6th grade. School enrollment continued increasing. In 1928, Herring Street expanded to include all grades up until 8th and later, in 1933, the school began teaching grades 9–12. In 1945, money was raised by the school to establish a school football team and band.

In 1955, Herring Street school split into Beacon Elementary School and Trinity High School. Despite the 1954 Brown vs Board of Education of Topeka ruling, it took until 1972 for Decatur schools to fully desegregate. After the split in grades, Albert J. Martin became the first and only principal of Trinity High. Following the Civil Rights Act of 1964, any new African American students who weren't already enrolled in the school system or who lived near Decatur High and wished to transfer were given the choice to attend either Trinity High or its previously white-only counterpart Decatur High School.

Trinity High school was fully closed and all of its students merged into Decatur High School in 1967. In 2015, the site of Trinity high school was converted into Beacon Municipal Center. Due to years of neglect, much of the site was deemed unsalvageable, however sections such as the school's gymnasium were successfully incorporated into the new construction. The site hosts Decatur's police station, municipal court, and public recreation areas. The site also hosts an exhibit which features the history of the Beacon neighborhood - including many Trinity High artifacts.

== Academics ==
Until the public library was desegregated in 1962, Trinity High school's library was the only public library available for non-white Decaturites to access. With the exception of Latin, Trinity featured the same list of classes as Decatur High.

== Athletics ==
Athletic activities at Trinity High included Football, Cheerleading, and Marching band.

== Accomplishments ==
=== Athletic ===
==== 1965-1966 ====
- The school's football team won the state championship, finishing undefeated.

== Notable alumni ==
- Clarence Cooper, judge
- Clarence Scott, former professional football player
