= Clarence Scott =

American football player (born 1949)

No. 22
- Position: Cornerback / Safety

Personal information
- Born: April 9, 1949 (age 77); Atlanta, Georgia, U.S.
- Listed height: 6 ft 0 in (1.83 m)
- Listed weight: 190 lb (86 kg)

Career information
- High school: Trinity (Decatur, Georgia)
- College: Kansas State
- NFL draft: 1971: 1st round, 14th overall pick

Career history
- Cleveland Browns (1971–1983)

Awards and highlights
- Second-team All-Pro (1973); Pro Bowl (1973); Cleveland Browns Legends; First-team All-American (1970); First-team All-Big Eight (1970); Kansas State Hall of Fame (2003); Kansas Sports Hall of Fame (2018)

Career NFL statistics
- Interceptions: 39
- Yards: 407
- Touchdowns: 2
- Stats at Pro Football Reference

Clarence Raymond Scott Jr. (born April 9, 1949) is an American former professional football player who was a safety for 13 seasons with the Cleveland Browns in the National Football League (NFL) from 1971 to 1983. He played college football for the Kansas State Wildcats.

== Early life ==
Scott was raised in Decatur, Georgia and attended the former African-American school Trinity High School in Decatur. As a junior in 1965, Scott helped Trinity to a state title.

== College career ==
Scott played college football at Kansas State University, where he was named an All-American following the 1970 season.

== Professional career ==
He was the first defensive back selected in the 1971 NFL draft at 14th in the first round by the Browns. He proved to be a steady presence with the Browns, earning Pro Bowl honors in 1973, a season in which he had five interceptions for 71 yards and one touchdown.
