= Herb White =

American basketball player

Personal information
- Born: June 15, 1948 (age 78) Valdosta, Georgia, U.S.
- Listed height: 6 ft 2 in (1.88 m)
- Listed weight: 195 lb (88 kg)

Career information
- High school: Decatur (Decatur, Georgia)
- College: Georgia (1967–1970)
- NBA draft: 1970: 8th round, 133rd overall pick
- Drafted by: Atlanta Hawks
- Playing career: 1970–1971
- Position: Point guard
- Number: 34

Career history
- 1970–1971: Atlanta Hawks
- Stats at NBA.com
- Stats at Basketball Reference

Ralph Herbert White (born June 15, 1948) is an American former basketball player during the 1970–71 season for the Atlanta Hawks. At 6'2" and 195 lbs., he played as a point guard.

Born in Valdosta, Georgia, White attended Decatur High School in Decatur, Georgia. He was voted the number one high school player in Georgia by the Atlanta Journal-Constitution in his senior year.

He went to the University of Georgia and as a senior in 1969–70, the starting forward averaged 9.8 points, 6.4 rebounds and 4.5 assists per game for the 13–12 Bulldogs.

He was drafted in the eighth round (133rd overall) of the 1970 NBA draft by the Atlanta Hawks. He played in 38 games, starting five, serving primarily as a backup to fellow rookie and future Hall-of-Famer Pete Maravich. He was also Maravich's roommate on the road. For the season, his only one in the NBA, he averaged 2.4 points, 1.3 rebounds and 1.2 assists per game. His most productive game came on December 29, 1970, as he scored 10 points against the Detroit Pistons.

Known for his great leaping ability, White's nickname was "The Elevator from Decatur". He was cited by Hall-of-Famer Wilt Chamberlain as the greatest dunker he ever saw during pregame warmups. He once received a standing ovation from the Madison Square Garden crowd for his pre-game dunking show.

White was drafted into the U.S. Army in March 1971. He later played and coached professional basketball in Europe and in Mexico.

In 2013, White received the most nominations for the Atlanta Journal-Constitution's list of the 10 greatest dunkers in Georgia high school history.

White served as a Senior Account Representative for Georgia Public Broadcasting from 1991 to 2009. In 1993, he and producer Tom Vardase brought high school sports programming to GPB, securing funding for the initial season of Prep Sports +, which went on to become the longest-running high school sports show in the country. In 1997, they negotiated the rights to the Georgia state high school football semifinals and finals, GPB's high school sports programming has expanded to include the boys and girls basketball championships and the wrestling and cheerleading championships.

In 2004 White began to do research for a documentary about the Georgia Intersholastic Association. The GIA was the black high school league in Georgia during the era of segregation, as the all-white Georgia High School Association excluded black teams and athletes from competing in their events. From his experiences as a young teenager playing against black basketball players in summer pick-up games White knew that the black players were superior to most of the competition he encountered in the all-white GHSA. He also had an immediate affinity for the less structured and dynamic style of play preferred his newfound African/American friends. His intention in creating the documentary was to recognize the athletes, coaches and teams of the GIA that had played their contests in almost total obscurity due to the newspapers and other media ignoring the noteworthy accomplishments of those in the GIA. One of the former GIA coaches told white "it was like we were invisible" so White named his documentary "As If We Were Ghosts". He secured the involvement of two talented, Independent producers that he had worked with at GPB on other projects. Nwandi Lawson and Bruce Burkhardt worked tirelessly on the film for very little compensation. Ron Bivins, a former GIA athlete and Atlanta businessman donated generously for several years to keep the production moving forward.

The documentary premiered on June 13, 2022. It was received very favorably by the public and recognized as an overdue setting right of a decades long injustice to thousands of Georgia's black citizens. White raised over $4 million in corporate funding for high school sports on GPB prior to his retirement in 2009.

White resides near Lake Chapala Mexico with his wife, Wanda.

== Career statistics ==
Legend
GP	Games played	GS	Games started	MPG	Minutes per game
FG%	Field goal percentage	3P%	3-point field goal percentage	FT%	Free throw percentage
RPG	Rebounds per game	APG	Assists per game	SPG	Steals per game
BPG	Blocks per game	PPG	Points per game	**Bold**	Career high

=== NBA ===
==== Regular season ====
Year	Team	GP	MPG	FG%	FT%	RPG	APG	PPG
1970–71	Atlanta	38	8.3	.405	.564	1.3	1.2	2.4
