= Decatur High School (Georgia) =

Public school in Decatur, Georgia, United States

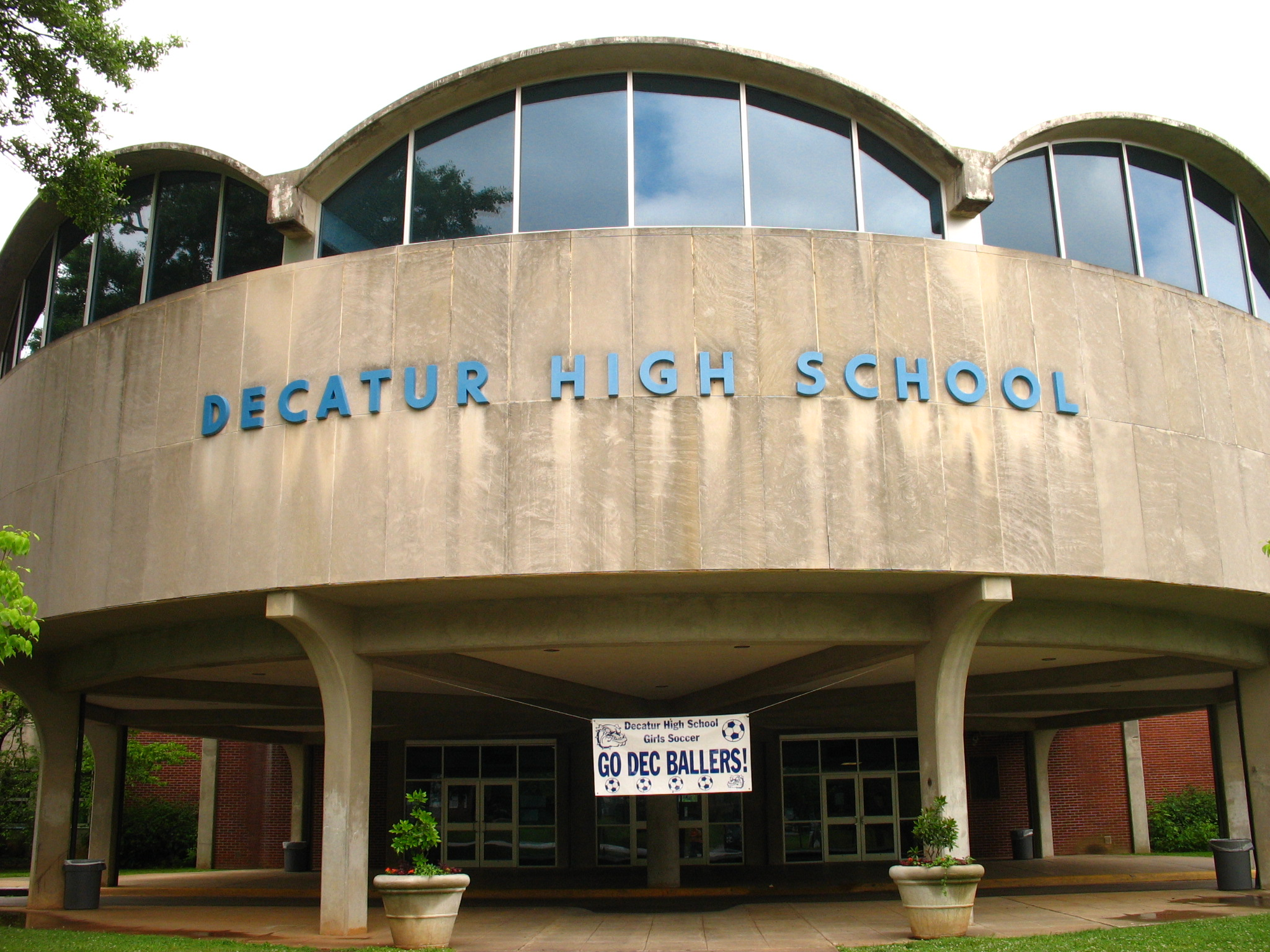
- Decatur High School in 2006

Location
- 310 North McDonough Street; Decatur, Georgia 30030-3393; United States; 33°46′15″N 84°17′50″W

Information
- Type: Public High School
- Motto: Carpe Diem
- Established: 1912
- School district: City Schools of Decatur
- Principal: Duane Sprull
- Teaching staff: 130.90 (FTE)
- Grades: 9–12
- Enrollment: 1,834 (2023–2024)
- Student to teacher ratio: 14.01
- Campus: Urban
- Colors: Navy and gold
- Mascot: Bulldog
- Accreditation: Southern Association of Colleges and Schools
- Region: 4 in Class AAAAA (GHSA)
- Website: dhs.csdecatur.net

Decatur High School (DHS) is a high school in Decatur, Georgia, United States. It is City Schools of Decatur's sole high school and was established in 1912.

== History ==
The school was established in 1912 as a co-ed school until it was divided into the single-sex Decatur Boys High school and Decatur Girls High school in 1932. The two schools stood side-by-side with a fence in between, the Girls in the south building and the boy's in the north building. The south building had originally been built in 1909 to house the "Central Grammar School". In 1930, the school installed lights to the school stadium, which according to the school district at the time, made it the first lit sports field in metro Atlanta. The school became co-ed in 1953. The current building was built in 1965 on the site of the former girls' high school. In 1965, the first 27 African American students integrated the school. After the closing of the nearby Trinity High School, its primarily African American student base was merged into Decatur High in 1967. The school was fully desegregated in 1972.

The campus also hosts a "Performing Arts Center," opened in November 2009, which includes a theatre, basketball court, additional classrooms, a 4,000 seat stadium, rehearsal room, and a range of multi-use spaces. In 2018, the main building was renovated with the addition of a new media center, a cafeteria, a new lobby area, and additional classrooms.

== Academics ==
The standard core curriculum at Decatur High School is taught at the college-preparatory level, advanced, and the Advanced Placement level may begin in the 10th grade. Students may also enroll in work-study opportunities or internships, and take joint enrollment classes at local colleges. 97% of the class of 2024 attended a four-year college and 81% met the HOPE Scholarship.

The average scores for the PSAT, the SAT, and the Georgia High School Graduation Test are all above the state averages with class of 2024 reporting an average ACT of 24.6 and an SAT of 1169. 170 students in the class of 2022 completed the ACT, while 75% of students in the class of 2023 completed the SAT. The school met Adequate Yearly Progress for the 2010–2011 school year. Students also have to take the MAP (Measures of Academic Progress) tests two times every year.

The school continues the International Baccalaureate middle years programme started at Beacon Hill Middle School through the 9th and 10th grades. Sophomores may apply to the IB Diploma Programme or IB Career Programme after completion of the middle years program. The IB Career Programme courses which Decatur offers include: Architectural Drawing and Design, JROTC, Career & Technical Instruction, Certified Nursing Assistant Certification, Computer Science, Convergence Media/Audio-Visual Technology Film, Culinary Arts, Early Childhood Education, Furniture Design, Graphic Design, IB Design Technology, Teaching as a Profession, and Work-Based Learning. The Class of 2025 is estimated to graduate with 107 Full IB Diploma program and 50 IB Career program candidates, along with an additional 50 seniors sitting for IB exams. 100 students of the class of 2025 are reported to be participating in dual enrollment courses.

== Athletics ==
Athletic activities include Baseball, Basketball, Cross Country, E-Sports, Flag Football, Football, Golf, Gymnastics, Lacrosse, Literary, Soccer, Softball, Swimming, Tennis, Track, Volleyball, Water Polo, and Wrestling.

== Accomplishments ==
=== Academic ===
==== 2010–2011 ====
- Became an AP Honor School and was included in The Washington Post's Challenge Index.
- Five seniors entered the HerWorld competition and won by designing a smart toothbrush.

==== 2012–2013 ====
- The DHS robotics team won the FRC Peachtree Division regionals.

==== 2015–2016 ====
- The DHS robotics team won the FRC Peachtree District State Championship.

==== 2021–2022 ====
- The DHS Mock Trial Team won the 2022 Georgia mock trial state championship

==== 2023–2024 ====
- Decatur Mayor Patti Garrett presented the DHS Ivy League club a certificate of appreciation during a Decatur City Commission meeting for showing commitment to environmental conservation and for contributing to "the community's natural beauty."
- The valedictorian for the class of 2024 was selected to be one of among 161 American high school seniors to be recognized as a U.S. Presidential Scholar.
- The DHS Mock Trial Team won the 2024 Georgia mock trial state championship

==== 2024–2025 ====
- CSD was ranked first out of 172 participating school districts for ACT scores, and second out of 182 schools for SAT scores in the state
- The DHS Mock Trial Team won the 2025 Georgia mock trial state championship.

=== Athletic ===
Type	Sport	State Titles	Team Title Year	Individual Title Year
Boys' Sports	Baseball	1	1948	
Boys' Sports	Basketball	4	1957, 1970, 1982, 1989	
Boys' Sports	Cross Country	3	2019, 2021, 2022	
Boys' Sports	Football	3	1949, 1950, 1965	
Boys' Sports	Rifflery	2	1952, 1963	
Boys' Sports	Soccer	3	1977, 2003, 2016	
Boys' Sports	Swimming	2		2024, 2026
Boys' Sports	Track	10		2015 (2), 2016 (2), 2017 (2), 2021 (2), 2022, 2024
Boys' Sports	Wrestling	2		2001, 2007
Girls' Sports	Basketball	1	1972	
Girls' Sports	Cross Country	2	2022, 2023	
Girls' Sports	Swimming	12	1953, 1954, 1955, 1960, 1961	
Girls' Sports	Track	7	2006, 2011	2015, 2022, 2023, 2024 (2)
Girls' Sports	Ultimate Frisbee	1	2022	
Coed Sports	ROTC Raiders	3	2001, 2002, 2005	

==== 2006–2007 ====
- The Girls' Cross Country Team won the Class 2A State Championship in 2006.

==== 2011–2012 ====
- The Girls' Cross Country Team won the Class 2A State Championship in 2011.

==== 2019–2020 ====
- The Boys Cross Country Team won the Class 5A State Championship in 2019, the team's first State Title in Cross County

==== 2021–2022 ====
- On 14, May, 2022 the girls ultimate frisbee team won the state girls ultimate frisbee championship, ending their season undefeated.

==== 2022–2023 ====
- The DHS Boys and Girls Cross County both won the 5A GHSA State Championship respectively. Three runners were named to the Atlanta Track Club All-Metro Cross Country Team.

== In popular culture ==
=== Film and television ===
- The 2015 American action-comedy film, Barely Lethal, depicts the school's football stadium and features DHS marching band students as extras.

== Controversies ==
=== Racial discrimination controversy ===
In May 2020, a video began circulating showing a DHS student, a son of a DHS IB coordinator and teacher, holding a toy gun, using racial slurs and threatening black DHS students. The boy’s mother was demoted and reassigned to a job in CSD's central offices. In December 2020, the mother, who is white, filed a racial discrimination suit against City Schools of Decatur. In January 2022, it was reported that CSD settled out of court and agreed to pay her $350,000 USD.

== Notable alumni ==
- Roy Blount, Jr., writer and humorist
- Frank Broyles, college football player, coach and administrator
- Carlos Cardoza, professional baseball coach
- George H. Carley, Georgia Supreme Court justice and chief justice
- Pete Case, former professional football player
- Felipe Claybrooks, former professional football player
- Lauren Gunderson, playwright, screenwriter, and short story author
- DeForest Kelley, actor
- Gorden Kelley, former professional football player
- Kyle Kitchens, professional football player
- Larry Morris, former professional football player, College Football Hall of Fame member
- Matthew O'Brien, author, journalist, editor and teacher
- Frances Freeborn Pauley, southern civil rights activist
- Stephen W. Pless, only Marine aviator awarded the Medal of Honor in the Vietnam War
- Joey Rosskopf, international cyclist
- Morgan Saylor, actress
- David Sims, former professional football player
- Jim Umbricht, former professional baseball player
- Jordan Walker, professional baseball player
- Herb White, former professional basketball player
- Daniel Wilcox, former professional football player
