= Marietta Daily Journal =

Newspaper in Marietta, Georgia

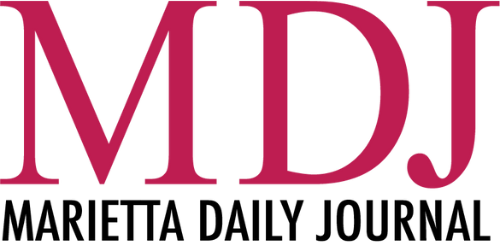

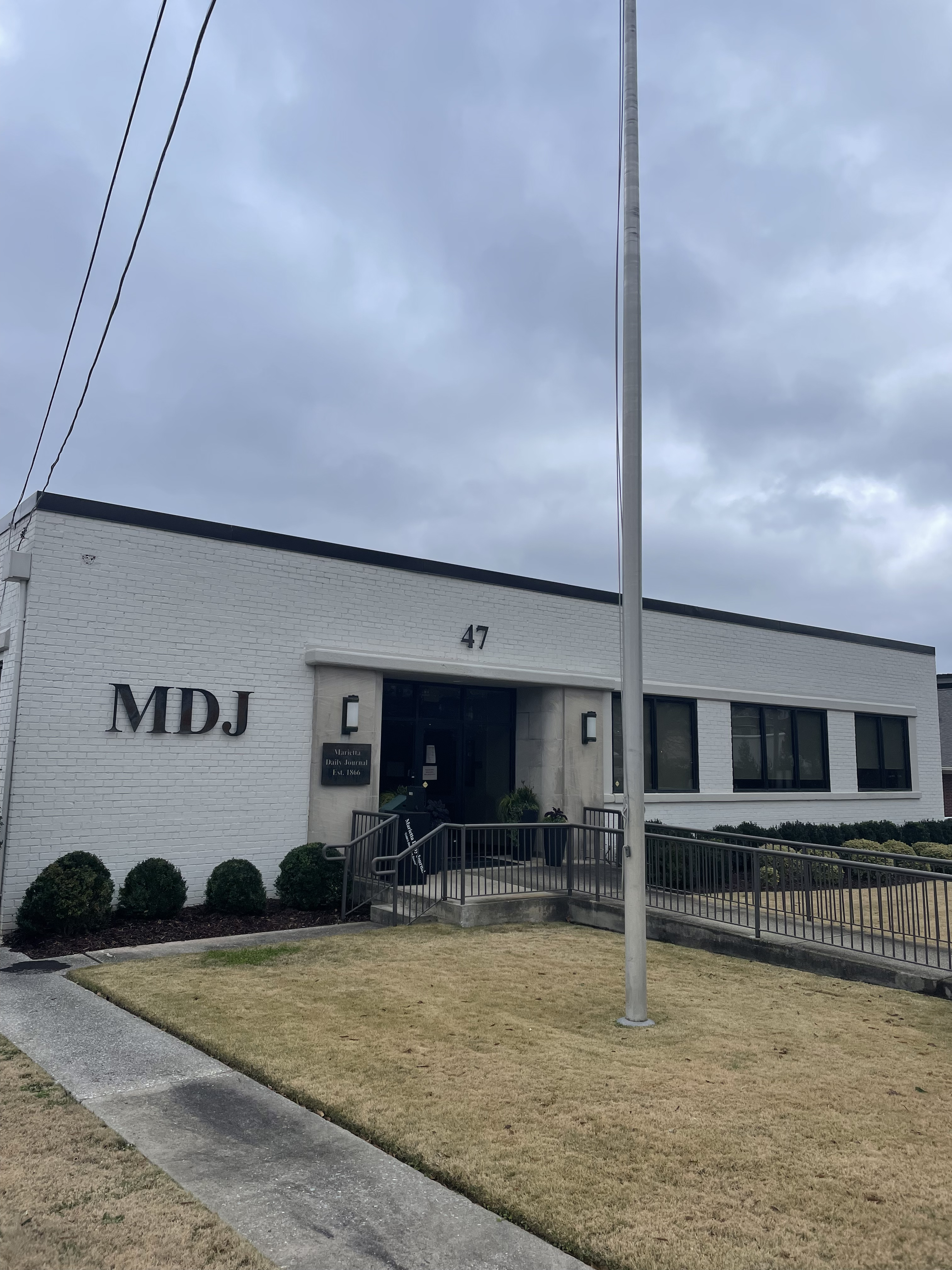
- Marietta Daily Journal headquarters in Marietta, Georgia
- Format: Daily newspaper
- Owner: Times-Journal Inc.
- Publisher: Otis Brumby, III
- Editor: J.K. Murphy
- Founded: 1866
- Political alignment: Moderate
- Language: English
- Headquarters: Marietta, Georgia
- Circulation: 15,790 (as of 2013)
- Sister newspapers: Cherokee Tribune, Neighbor Newspapers
- Website: mdjonline.com

The Marietta Daily Journal (MDJ) is a daily newspaper published in Marietta, Georgia. It is the primary local newspaper of Cobb County, Georgia (of which Marietta is the county seat, largest city, and geographic center), second only to the Atlanta Journal-Constitution, which covers all of metro Atlanta, and previously most of north Georgia.

Thursdays have other versions delivered to everyone in the county, even those without a subscription, supported instead by ad inserts. These are the East Cobb Neighbor for East Cobb, the North Cobb Neighbor for Kennesaw and Acworth, the South Cobb Neighbor for Mableton, Powder Springs, and Austell, and the Smyrna Neighbor for Smyrna. The Vinings Neighbor, also published in Cobb around Vinings, is from a different office.

All are published by Neighbor Newspapers, which produces other weeklies of the same format across most metro Atlanta counties, from other offices in those county seats. To the north, the Cherokee Tribune is published daily by the same company for Cherokee County, Georgia.

In 2015, parent company Times-Journal Inc. acquired News Publishing Co., parent of the Rome News-Tribune and several weeklies.
