= Rome News-Tribune =

Newspaper in Rome, Georgia

- Front page of the August 27, 2025, issue
- Type: Daily newspaper
- Owner: Times-Journal Inc.
- Editor: Tom Mayer
- Founded: 1843
- Headquarters: 305 East 6th Avenue, Rome, Georgia, USA
- Circulation: 13,451 (as of 2013)
- ISSN: 1060-4049
- OCLC number: 21967923
- Website: romenews-tribune.com

Rome News-Tribune is the local daily newspaper of Rome, Georgia, in the United States. Begun originally as a weekly newspaper, the paper has survived several merges with other newspapers and now distributes news on a daily basis through print and digital mediums.

== History ==
The Rome News-Tribune was established in 1843 by Captain Melville Dwinnell under the name, Rome Courier. Founded just nine years after the city of Rome, Georgia in 1834, the Rome News-Tribune is one of the area's oldest newspapers. Initially, the Rome Courier published newspapers on a weekly basis but later switched to a tri-weekly publishing schedule during the 1860s. During the antebellum period, Dwinnell traded subscriptions to his newspaper for practical goods, such as clothing, firewood, and food. When the Civil War erupted in the United States, Dwinnell joined the Confederacy and continued publishing the Rome Courier from the frontlines of the war. On May 4, 1864, the city of Rome, Georgia was captured by Union forces whom seized control of the Rome Courier and began publishing the Union Flag in its place.

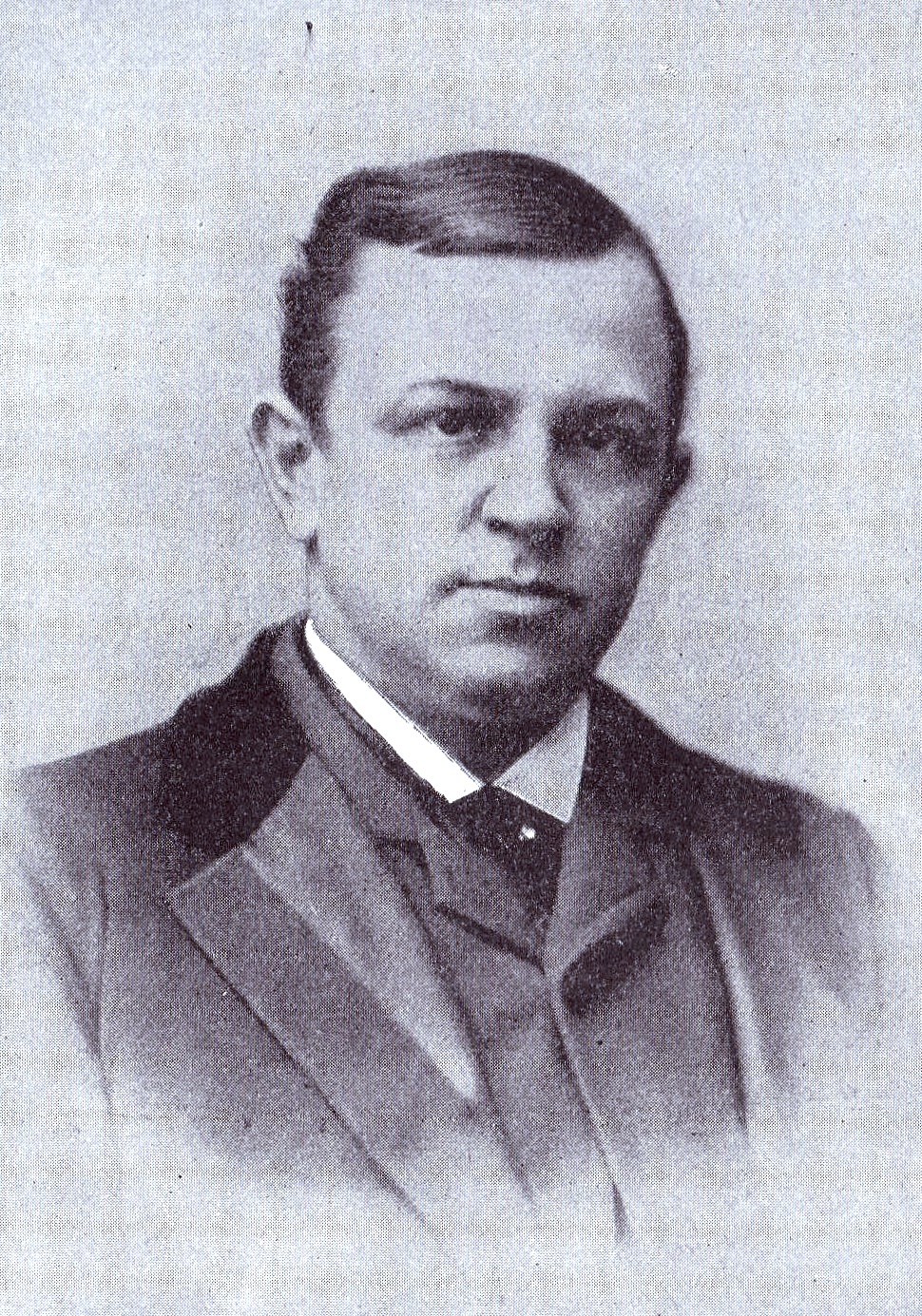
A photograph of American Journalist and former writer for the Rome Courier, Henry W. Grady

After the Civil War, publications of the Rome Courier were restored and Dwinnell regained ownership of the newspaper's operations. Famous journalist, Henry W. Grady, wrote for the revitalized newspaper during a brief period following the war. In 1885, Dwinnell sold the Rome Courier and it was renamed the Tribune of Rome in 1887. After a merger with the Rome Herald in 1908 and the Rome News in 1923, the newspaper was officially renamed The Rome News-Tribune in 1923. The Mooney family maintained ownership of the newspaper for much of the 20th and beginning of the 21st century (1928–2015) and eventually sold the newspaper to the parent company of the Marietta Daily Journal, Times-Journal Inc.

== Notable former writers ==
- Henry W. Grady
- Bill Arp
- Robert Stacy McCain

== Awards ==
- 2007 New Frontier Award
- 2006 Ron Autry Award
