= Georgia Council on Human Relations =

U.S. non-profit organization

The Georgia Council on Human Relations (GCHR) was a biracial group working against prejudice and discrimination due to race, religion, ethnicity, and nationality. Non-profit, interracial, and non-denominational, at its peak the GCHR operated in ten chapters across the state, including Albany, Atlanta, Augusta, Columbus, LaGrange, Macon, and Savannah. GCHR was the Southern Regional Council's Georgia affiliate.

The GCHR initially focused on school desegregation. After Brown v. Board of Education required American schools to desegregate, the Council worked to ensure that the decision in Brown was implemented. When the Georgia state legislature threatened to close Georgia's public schools rather than integrate them, the GCHR worked with Help Our Public Education (HOPE) to keep them open.

The GCHR worked with groups including the Student Nonviolent Coordinating Committee, the Congress of Racial Equality, the American Friends Service Committee, the YMCA, and the YWCA.

With approximately 1,500 members working in law, medicine, religion, and other sectors, the GCHR included social justice notables such as Frances Pauley.

The GCHR ceased to operate in the 1960s.
