= Stephen Tuck =

British historian

- Born: Stephen George Newsam Tuck
- Occupations: Historian and academic
- Title: Professor of Modern History
- Children: 4

Academic background
- Education: Gonville and Caius College, Cambridge

Academic work
- Discipline: History
- Sub-discipline: History of the United States; Civil rights movement; Political history; Social history
- Institutions: Brown University; Pembroke College, Oxford; London Interdisciplinary School

Stephen George Newsam Tuck is a British historian. He is academic director and course director for the Bachelor of Arts and Science at the London Interdisciplinary School. Prior to this he was a fellow of Pembroke College, Oxford, where he was a professor of Modern History, focusing on the history of the United States. He is the author of three books about the Civil Rights Movement, and the co-editor of a fourth book about the same topic.

== Early life ==
Stephen Tuck "grew up in Wolverhampton, near Birmingham, England." He graduated from Gonville and Caius College, Cambridge.

== Career ==
Prior to joining the London Interdisciplinary School in 2025, Tuck was a professor of Modern History, tutor in History and fellow of Pembroke College, Oxford. He is also affiliated with the Rothermere American Institute. Prior to joining Pembroke College, Tuck held a position at Brown University. With French historian François Weil, Tuck is the convenor of the European Network on Writing American History. Additionally, Tuck is the author of three books, and the co-editor of a fourth book with professor Kevin M. Kruse of Princeton University. In 2013 he became the inaugural director of the Oxford Research Centre in the Humanities (TORCH). He was awarded the title of distinction of Professor of Modern History by the University of Oxford in November 2014.

His first book, Beyond Atlanta: The Struggle for Racial Equality in Georgia, 1940-1980, was based on his PhD thesis. In a review for The Journal of Southern History, Michelle Brittain of Georgia State University explains that Tuck "challenges the old view that the civil rights movement began in Montgomery, ended in Selma, and was led by Martin Luther King Jr." Brittain notes that "Tuck has provided a great historical service that is sure to provoke more study." Reviewing it for the Tennessee Historical Quarterly, Carroll Van West was similarly laudatory, calling it "illuminating." Meanwhile, professor Robert Cassanello of the University of Central Florida called it "an important contribution to an ever expanding body of scholarship on the Civil Rights Movement." In the Georgia Historical Quarterly, professor John A. Kirk of the University of Arkansas regretted that it was too short, but concluded that it was "a benchmark work on the subject that is essential reading for anyone wanting to pursue that story further." In The Journal of American History, professor Clayborne Carson of Stanford University noted that Tuck "succeeds in identifying both general patterns and exceptional factors that distinguished civil rights activism in different parts" of Georgia. Reviewing it for the History of Education Quarterly, professor Richard M. Breaux of the University of Wisconsin regretted that Tuck's analysis of student activism is "minimal."

His second book, We Ain't What We Ought to Be: The Black Freedom Struggle from Emancipation to Obama, tracks the black freedom struggle over five decades. In The Georgia Historical Quarterly, professor Douglas Flamming of the Georgia Institute of Technology praised it as an ambitious and engaging read. Professor Abel A. Bartley of Clemson University agreed, calling it "a stimulating narrative" and "a fresh, innovative, provocative look at the African American past, one that challenges readers to reevaluate their understanding of America's past." In Louisiana History: The Journal of the Louisiana Historical Association, professor Greta de Jong of the University of Nevada, Reno praised the book as a "highly accessible, thorough account of African American struggles against racism in the 150 years since slavery" and "a welcome corrective to standard portrayals that present the nonviolent, integrationist civil rights movement of the 1960s as the pinnacle of black political activism in the United States." She stressed Tuck's insistence that the Civil Rights Movement was primarily a movement for economic justice, where race was used as an excuse for exclusion. Reviewing it for The Florida Historical Quarterly, professor Erica L. Ball of California State University, Fullerton noted that Tuck highlights the movement's insistence on cultural emancipation, not just agency in the political realm. Ball concluded by calling it, "an extraordinary achievement: richly detailed while broad in scope, immensely useful, and destined to serve as the standard survey of African American history for a long time to come." In The Journal of Southern History, Emilye Crosby, a professor of history at the State University of New York at Geneseo called it "a lively, well-written, thoughtful account". Crosby highlights Tuck's focus on women as active participants in the Civil Rights Movement. Reviewing it for The Journal of American History, Professor Steven F. Lawson of Rutgers University described it as "comprehensive, balanced and readable" and "the best interpretive volume of the black freedom struggle since 1865."

His third book, The Night Malcolm X Spoke at the Oxford Union: A Transatlantic Story of Antiracist Protest, is not only about civil rights activist Malcolm X's visit to the Oxford Union on December 3, 1964, but also a contextualization of the "global, national, local, and university politics of race." Reviewing it for the Financial Times, professor Christopher Phelps of the University of Nottingham noted that "Tuck handles Malcolm X’s Muslim faith deftly but his emergent socialism, developed on visits to such African nations as Ghana, is barely mentioned." In The Independent, journalist Yasmin Alibhai-Brown praised the book, writing "by revealing unknown facts and dormant truths, through reflections and imaginative connections, he [Tuck] fundamentally reframes the narrative." In a review for Labour/Le Travail, professor Daniel McNeil of Carleton University dismissed the book as "more similar in tone and content to articles in the (neo)liberal media that have marked the anniversary of X’s speech and assassination by asking pundits and historians to provide pithy accounts of race relations in Britain and the United States during the past fifty years." In particular, he criticized Tuck's characterization of white working-class culture as "lower class" and his "(over)reliance on journalistic articles". In The Journal of American History, professor John Keith of Binghamton University added that the book showed how Malcolm X's socialist politics "has been lost", though he concludes that Tuck offers "many suggestive avenues" in that direction.

== Personal life ==
Tuck has a wife, Katie, and four children.

== Selected works ==
- Tuck, Stephen (2003). Beyond Atlanta: The Struggle for Racial Equality in Georgia, 1940-1980. Athens, Georgia: University of Georgia Press. ISBN 9780820325286. OCLC 52232220.
- Kruse, Kevin M.; Tuck, Stephen, eds. (2009). The Fog of War: World War II and the Civil Rights Movement. New York: Oxford University Press. ISBN 9780199932641. OCLC 939855198.
- Tuck, Stephen (2010). We Ain't What We Ought to Be: The Black Freedom Struggle from Emancipation to Obama. Cambridge, Massachusetts: Harvard University Press. ISBN 9780674062290. OCLC 751735461.
- Tuck, Stephen (2014). The Night Malcolm X Spoke at the Oxford Union: A Transatlantic Story of Antiracist Protest. Oakland, California: University of California Press. ISBN 9780520279339. OCLC 903172425.
