= Mary Hamilton (activist) =

American civil rights activist (1935–2002)

Mary Lucille Hamilton
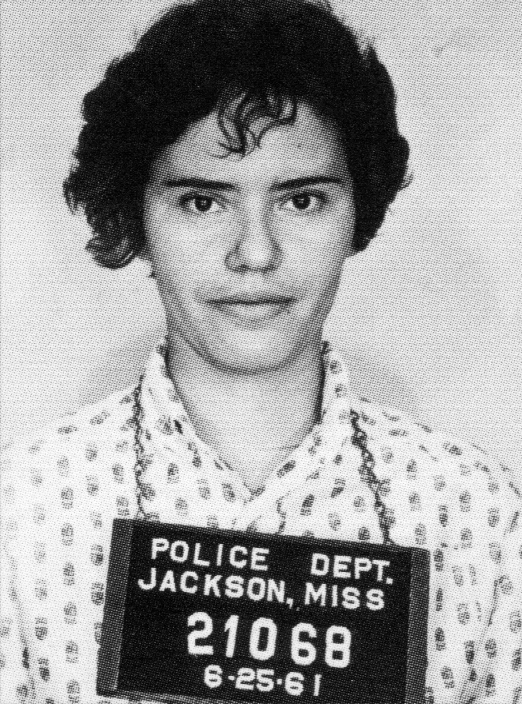
- The 1961 arrest photo for Harlem CORE member Mary Hamilton as a Freedom Rider in Jackson, Mississippi. At the time, she was 25 years old.
- Born: October 13, 1935; Cedar Rapids, Iowa
- Died: November 11, 2002 (aged 67)
- Other names: Mary Hamilton Young, Mary Hamilton Wesley
- Occupations: Activist, teacher
- Known for: Hamilton v. Alabama (1964)
- Movement: Civil rights movement

Mary Lucille Hamilton (October 13, 1935 – November 11, 2002) was an African American civil rights activist. Her case before the United States Supreme Court, Hamilton v. Alabama, decided that an African American woman was entitled to the same courteous forms of address customarily reserved solely to whites in the Southern United States, and that calling a black person by his or her first name in a legal proceeding was "a form of racial discrimination".

== Early life and education ==
Hamilton was born to Robert Emerson DeCarlo and Elizabeth Winston Hamilton. She was raised Catholic by her grandmother, partially in Cedar Rapids, Iowa, and was a graduate of East Denver High School in Denver, Colorado in 1953. She received her B.S. degree at Briarcliff College in Briarcliff Manor, New York, and her M.A.T. (Master of Arts in Teaching) in 1971 at Manhattanville College in Purchase, New York.

== Activism ==
Hamilton, who grew up in Iowa and Colorado, wanted to be a nun and briefly taught parochial school in Los Angeles. After discovering socialism, she became active in the civil rights movement in the South, and joined the Congress of Racial Equality (CORE). She participated in the Freedom Rides, and was arrested in Jackson, Mississippi, in 1961, enduring "sweltering jails, [and] invasive and unnecessary vaginal exams, answering police and jail officers with "polite noncompliance".

She continued to engage in non-violent protest and helped register voters, all the while being arrested frequently at protests, and rose to the position of "field secretary", the only female field secretary at the time, only the third one in CORE's history, and the first one to be allowed to work in the South. Eventually she became CORE's Southern regional director.

== Hamilton v. Alabama (1964) ==
"I won't respond," she said, "until you call me Miss Hamilton."

After being arrested in Lebanon, Tennessee, a mayor who visited her addressed her as Mary, without the honorific "Miss" or "Mrs.", which were then frequently denied to African Americans, but she corrected him: "if you don't know how to speak to a lady...then get out of my cell." She was one of many civil rights protesters arrested in 1963 in Gadsden, Alabama, and during cross examination at a habeas corpus hearing by the prosecutor in the Etowah County courthouse she refused to answer unless he stopped addressing her as "Mary", demanding she be called "Miss Hamilton". Supported by her lawyer and enduring what she later reported were lewd comments directed at her by Judge Cunningham, she was fined $50 for contempt of court and, when she refused to pay, spent five days in jail. An appeal was filed on grounds that she was denied her constitutional rights since she did not receive the same treatment as white witnesses. It was denied by the Alabama Supreme Court and ended up before the United States Supreme Court, which in April 1964 unanimously overruled the lower court without hearing oral arguments.

The case made national headlines and Hamilton was featured on the cover of Jet magazine, but it reportedly left her tired and in ill health.

== Later life and death ==
In 1964, Hamilton left CORE to marry Walter Young, who was a dentist, and returned to her hometown in Denver, Colorado. That marriage ended in divorce, as did her subsequent marriage to Harold Wesley.

She worked as a union organizer for 1199, the Drug & Hospital Workers, and as an educator in New York, earning an MAT from Manhattanville College in 1971 and going on to teach English at Sleepy Hollow High School until she retired in 1990.

Hamilton died on November 13, 2002, after a seven-year battle against fourth-stage ovarian cancer.

== See also ==
- Sheila Michaels
