= Hamilton v. Alabama (1964) =

- Supreme Court of the United States

Decided March 30, 1964
- Full case name: Hamilton v. Alabama
- Citations: 376 U.S. 650 (more) 84 S. Ct. 982; 11 L. Ed. 2d 979; 1964 U.S. LEXIS 1544

Court membership
- Chief Justice Earl Warren Associate Justices Hugo Black · William O. Douglas; Tom C. Clark · John M. Harlan II; William J. Brennan Jr. · Potter Stewart; Byron White · Arthur Goldberg

Case opinions
- Per curiam
- Concurrence: Black
- Dissent: Clark
- Dissent: Harlan
- Dissent: White

Hamilton v. Alabama, 376 U.S. 650 (1964), is a United States Supreme Court case in which the court held that an African American woman, Mary Hamilton, was entitled to the same courteous forms of address customarily reserved solely for whites in the Southern United States, and that calling a black person by their first name in a formal context was "a form of racial discrimination".

== Background ==
Mary Hamilton was a field secretary for the Congress of Racial Equality in Alabama. In 1963, along with hundreds of others, she was arrested during civil rights protests in Gadsden.

At a habeas corpus hearing on June 25 challenging the legitimacy of those arrests, she refused to answer questions on the witness stand until she was addressed with the same courtesy accorded white witnesses. At that time, in the South and in many other parts of the U.S., it was customary for judges and prosecutors to address white witnesses by last names and courtesy titles, such as "Mr. Jones" or "Mrs. Smith", while addressing all nonwhite witnesses by the first name without honorific. When the county prosecutor addressed Hamilton by her first name only, she said she would not answer any questions unless she were addressed as "Miss Hamilton". When she persisted in her demand to be addressed in this manner, the judge held her in contempt of court and sentenced her to five days in jail and a $50 fine.

After serving the five days, she refused to pay the fine and was allowed out on bond to appeal the contempt conviction. After the Alabama Supreme Court denied her appeal, the NAACP Legal Defense and Educational Fund asked the Supreme Court to review Hamilton's case. Her lawyers argued that the first-name form of address used by the prosecutor was part of a "racial caste system" that violated Hamilton's equal protection guarantees.

== Opinion of the Court ==
In a 6–3 per curiam opinion, the Supreme Court granted certiorari (agreed to consider the case) and, without hearing any oral arguments, found in Hamilton's favor, reversing the judgment of the Alabama Supreme Court. In support of its summary decision, the court cited its 1963 ruling in Johnson v. Virginia, in which it had unanimously held that "a State may not require racial segregation in a courtroom".

Associate Justices Tom C. Clark, John M. Harlan II, and Byron White dissented from the majority's decision to grant certiorari.
