= Frankie Muse Freeman =

American lawyer

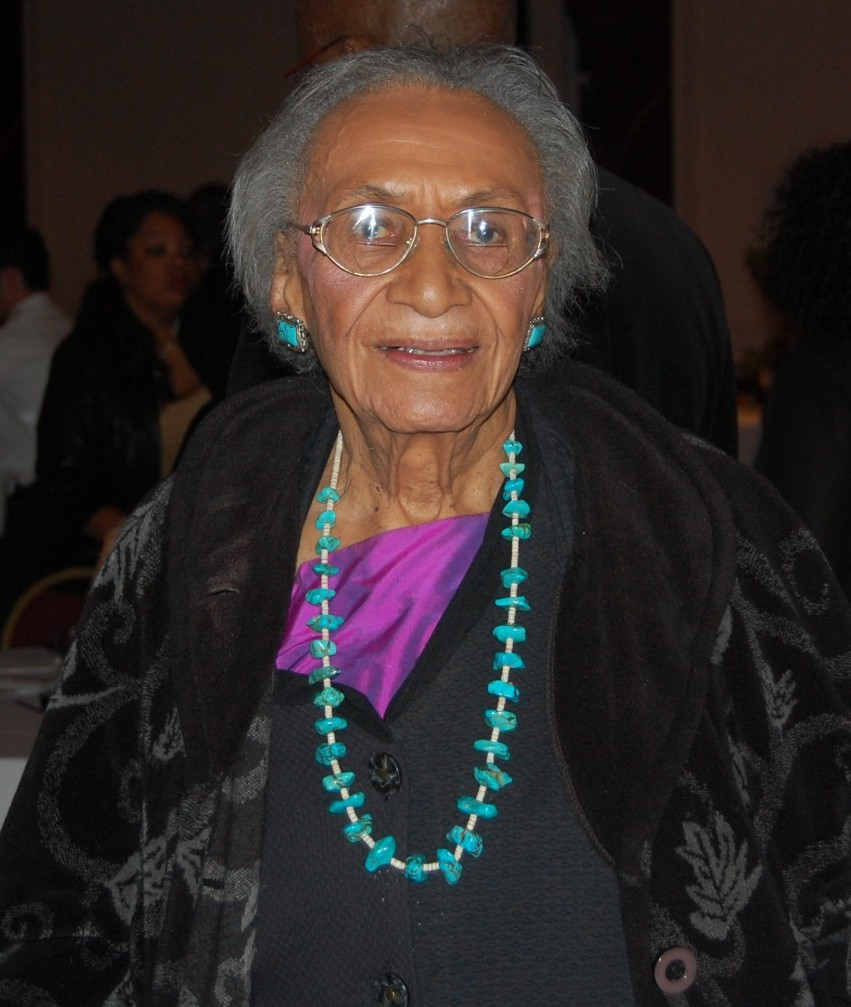
- Frankie Muse Freeman in 2013
- Born: Marie Frankie Muse; November 24, 1916; Danville, Virginia, U.S.
- Died: January 12, 2018 (aged 101); St. Louis, Missouri, U.S.
- Education: Hampton University; Howard University School of Law
- Organization(s): NAACP; U.S. Commission on Civil Rights; Howard University; National Urban League; Delta Sigma Theta sorority Epsilon Sigma Iota Sorority
- Movement: Civil Rights Movement

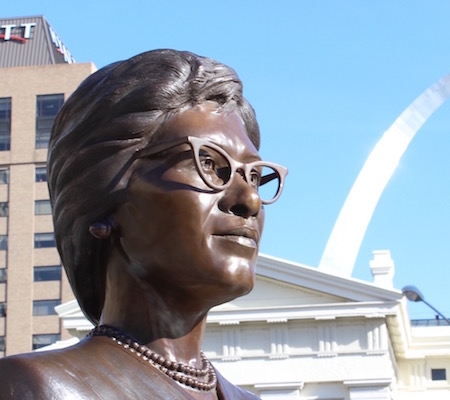
Bronze Statue of Frankie Muse Freeman in Downtown St. Louis

Marie Frankie Muse Freeman (née Muse; November 24, 1916 – January 12, 2018) was an American civil rights attorney, and the first woman to be appointed to the United States Commission on Civil Rights (1964–79), a federal fact-finding body that investigates complaints alleging discrimination. Freeman was instrumental in creating the Citizens' Commission on Civil Rights founded in 1982. She was a practicing attorney in State and Federal courts for nearly sixty years.

In 2007, Freeman was inducted in the International Civil Rights Walk of Fame at the Martin Luther King Jr. National Historic Site, Atlanta, Georgia, for her leadership role in the Civil Rights Movement.

On February 5, 2015, President Barack Obama appointed Freeman to serve as a Member of the Commission on Presidential Scholars.

== Biography ==
The daughter of William Brown Muse and Maude Beatrice Smith Muse, Frankie came from a college-educated family. Her parents were active members of the National Association for the Advancement of Colored People (NAACP). She was born and grew up in Danville, Virginia. At age 16, Muse enrolled at Hampton Institute, which she attended from 1933 to 1936. Shortly afterward, Freeman moved to New York where she met her future husband Shelby T. Freeman Jr. and applied to St. John's Law School. However, the admissions office claimed they did not accept credits from Hampton University. She married Shelby Freeman in 1938 and birthed her only daughter Shelbe Patricia Bullock shortly thereafter. In 1944, she enrolled at Howard University Law School and received a law degree in 1947. She took the Bar Exam in Missouri and practiced law for seventy years. While a student at Howard Law, Freeman became a member of Epsilon Sigma Iota sorority, the first American legal sorority for women of color.

In 1948, after writing to several law firms and not hearing back from them, Muse decided to establish her own private practice. She began her practice with pro bono, divorce and criminal cases. After two years, Freeman began her work in civil rights when she became legal counsel to the NAACP legal team that filed suit against the St. Louis Board of Education in 1949. In 1954, Freeman was the lead attorney for the landmark NAACP case Davis et al. v. the St. Louis Housing Authority, which ended legal racial discrimination in public housing with the city.

In 1956, she began her role as Associate General Counsel for the St. Louis Land Clearance and Housing Authorities and was later promoted to General Counsel. In March 1964, she was nominated by President Lyndon Johnson as a member of the United States Commission on Civil Rights. On September 15, 1964, the Senate approved Freeman's nomination and she was officially appointed as the first black woman on the civil rights commission. Freeman was subsequently reappointed by presidents Richard Nixon, Gerald Ford and Jimmy Carter, and held the position until July 1979.

Freeman utilized her legal prowess to advocate for the ratification of the Equal Rights Amendment (ERA). In 1973, she published the pamphlet "What's in it for Black Women?" wherein she articulated the criticality of the ERA for American women, but more specifically, black women.

She was appointed as Inspector General for the Community Services Administration during Jimmy Carter's presidential administration in 1979. A year later, the Republican Ronald Reagan was elected president and demanded the resignation of Democratic inspectors general appointed by previous presidents.

Freeman returned to St. Louis, where she practiced law. In 1982, Freeman joined 15 other former high federal officials who formed a bipartisan Citizens Commission on Civil Rights, a group committed to ending racial discrimination and devising remedies that would counteract its harmful effects.

At age 90, she was still practicing law with Montgomery Hollie & Associates, L.L.C. in St. Louis, a three-attorney firm. She had numerous volunteer activities, such as adult Sunday school classes at Washington Tabernacle Missionary Baptist Church. She was on the board of the World Affairs Councils of America, St. Louis, with the mission to promote understanding, engagement, relationships, and leadership in world affairs.

In 2003, she published her memoir, A Song of Faith and Hope. She was the 14th National President of Delta Sigma Theta sorority. She turned 100 in November 2016.

== Civic activities ==
Freeman was a Trustee Emeritus of the Board of Trustees of Howard University, past chairman of the Board of Directors of the National Council on Aging, Inc. and the National Urban League of Metropolitan St. Louis. She was also a board member of the United Way of Greater St. Louis, the Metropolitan Zoological Park and Museum District, and the St. Louis Center for International Relations.

== Legacy and honors ==
- Freeman received honorary doctorate degrees from several institutions to include Hampton University, University of Missouri–St. Louis, Saint Louis University, Washington University in St. Louis and Howard University.
- 1990: Inducted into the National Bar Association's Hall of Fame.
- 2011: Received the Spingarn Medal of the NAACP.
- 2014: Received the Spirit of Excellence Award from the American Bar Association Commission on Racial and Ethnic Diversity in the Profession.

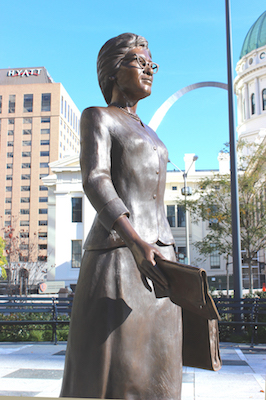
Bronze Statue of Frankie Muse Freeman

Sister Freeman had the honor of having a statue erected in downtown St. Louis in Kiener Plaza, at 500 Chestnut Street, with an unveiling date of November 21, 2017. The honor was presented by the NAACP and had many patrons to include Washington Tabernacle Missionary Baptist Church where Sister Freeman was an active member.

== See also ==
- List of first women lawyers and judges in Missouri
- Resolution of Accomplishments of Frankie Muse Freeman by the Missouri Bar

== Resources ==
- Muse Freeman, Frankie. A Song of Faith and Hope: The Life of Frankie Muse Freeman, Missouri Historical Society Press (April 2003) - ISBN 1-883982-41-3
