= City Schools of Decatur =

School district in Georgia (U.S. state)

Address
- 125 Electric Avenue Decatur, Georgia, 30030; United States
- Coordinates: 33.770520°N 84.301770°W

District information
- Grades: Pre-kindergarten – 12
- Superintendent: Dr. Gyimah Whitaker
- Accreditations: Southern Association of Colleges and Schools; Georgia Accrediting Commission
- Schools: 10
- NCES District ID: 1301680

Students and staff
- Enrollment: 5,655 (2022–23)
- Faculty: 448.60 (FTE)
- Staff: 374.90 (FTE)
- Student–teacher ratio: 12.61

Other information
- Telephone: (404) 371-3601
- Website: csdecatur.net

The City Schools of Decatur is a public charter school district in DeKalb County, Georgia, United States. It serves and is based in Decatur, Georgia.

City Schools of Decatur has an enrollment of approximately 5,700 students and operates 10 schools: one preschool, five K–2 lower elementary schools, two 3–5 upper elementary schools, one middle school, and one high school. They also run a virtual academy.

== History ==
The system opened in 1902 serving grades K-8. The districts first high school was originally established in 1912. In 1913, the Glennwood School was built, serving both high school and elementary students. The Glennwood School ceased hosting high school students in 1915 and became Decaturs only elementary school.

In 1915, Oakhurst Elementary was built. Winnona Park school opened on September 17, 1923. Clairemont Elementary was opened in 1936.

Winnona Park school survived two fires, one in 1959, the other in 1975.

Glennwood Elementary was renovated in 2002.

In 2004, CSD closed down Westchester Elementary School due to low enrollment numbers. The school later reopened in 2014 due to a "surge in enrollment." In 2013, a new wing was added to Oakhurst Elementary to meet this increased enrollment.

From 2004 to 2011, the building which now houses Glennwood Elementary served as the districts fourth and fifth grade academy. The school was reverted back to serving K-3 grade following the opening of the 4/5 Academy in 2011

On February 14 2013, President Barrack Obama visited the students at the College Heights Early Childhood Learning Center, before making a speech at the nearby Decatur Community Recreation Center.

In 2019, the district opened the Talley Street Upper Elementary School, serving fourth and fifth grade students. The same years, the district permanently changed its elementary schools to now only service K-2. The third grade students were soon moved to the two upper elementary schools, who began serving grades 3-5.

In 2022, CSD changed the name of the middle school from Carl G. Renfroe Middle to Beacon Hill Middle. The name change was intended to represent Decatur's previously thriving African-American Beacon Hill community and to help preserve the history of the area.

In Spring 2025, CSD held its first Special Olympics competition at the Decatur high school sports stadium. The event featured students with developmental disabilities to participate in events such as soccer, yard bowling, and tug-of-war. The event was open to the public and intended to promote disability awareness to the community.

== Academics ==
Students perform above the state and national averages on standardized tests at all grade levels. Each year City Schools of Decatur has ranked in the top ten districts in Georgia for SAT performance. Decatur High School has been named an AP Challenge and AP Merit school in Georgia. The average amount of experience among teachers is 13 years.

In 2025, Talley Street School and Beacon Hill Middle School were presented banners by Georgia State Superintendent Richard Woods in recognition of their latest literacy and math scores, respectively. The recognition was based on the 2023-2024 Georgia Milestones Assessments.

== Schools ==
=== Current Schools ===
==== Preschool ====
- College Heights Early Childhood Learning Center

==== Elementary schools ====
- Clairemont Elementary School (K–2)
- Glennwood Elementary School (K–2)
- Oakhurst Elementary School (K–2)
- Westchester Elementary School (K–2)
- Winnona Park Elementary School (K–2)
- Fifth Avenue Upper Elementary School (3–5)
- Talley Street Upper Elementary School (3–5)

==== Middle school ====
- Beacon Hill Middle School (6–8) (Formerly: Carl G. Renfroe Middle School)

==== High school ====
- Decatur High School (9–12)

==== Virtual Academy ====
"Virtual instruction is offered via electronic platforms. We use Georgia Virtual School as our main platform for students grades 6-12 and Pearson Connexus as our primary platform for elementary students. Virtual courses in these platforms are provided by Georgia-certified educators. In addition to the coursework, CSD staff provides daily check-ins, advisement, executive functioning support, academic intervention, social skills intervention. We work closely with students, families, and supporting professionals to address the needs of individual students."

=== Former Schools ===
==== Elementary schools ====
- Beacon Elementary School (K-8) (Closed in 1977)

==== High school ====
- Trinity High School (9-12) (Closed in 1967)
