= Powe v. Miles =

American legal case

- Court: United States Court of Appeals for the Second Circuit
- Full case name: Emile Powe, et al v. Leland Miles, et al
- Argued: November 14, 1968
- Decided: December 23, 1968
- Citations: 407 F.2d 73; 32 A.L.R.3d 846

Court membership
- Judges sitting: Harold Medina, Henry Friendly, John Joseph Smith

Case opinions
- Majority: Friendly, joined by a unanimous court

Laws applied
- Civil Rights Act of 1964

Powe v. Miles, 407 F.2d 73 (2d Cir. 1968), reversed a lower court decision, United States District Court for the Western District of New York, F.R.Civ. P. 65(a) (2), on an appeal of the court's decision that the District Court did not have jurisdiction on the case as Alfred University (Miles was President of the university), the defendant, was a private institution.

The court ruled that though Alfred University was a private institution, the College of Ceramics within the university was a public institution due to its state funding and governorship hence the court did have jurisdiction to hear the case of those plaintiffs who were students of the College of Ceramics. Those students from other parts of Alfred University were not within the court's jurisdiction as Alfred University did not meet the court's criteria for being a public institution.

== Facts ==
During the annual Parents Day celebration at Alfred University on May 11, 1968, a group of students and faculty staged a demonstration during the part of the ceremony in which participated the ROTC unit. The purpose of the demonstration was to advocate scholarships for black students, add the teaching of Afro-American history to the curriculum, end compulsory ROTC at the university, and advocate an end to the Vietnam War which was then in progress. The demonstration was non-violent though the signs of the demonstrators did block the view of some people attending the ceremony. The demonstrators positioned themselves such that during the ROTC ceremony which included dignitaries presenting awards to members of the ROTC unit, the dignitaries must walk from the reviewing stand through the line of demonstrators to the ROTC recipients arrayed on the review field.

The Dean of Students requested the demonstrators to move citing the demonstration did not meet the university's policy on demonstrations as the demonstration was obstructing the ceremony and prior notice of the demonstration had not been provided to university officials. Some of the demonstrators moved to the side of the field sitting down while still holding their signs. The remainder stayed firm in their positions. The Dean of Students then announced the remaining students were suspended and would be provided a hearing as to whether they should be expelled from the university the next day. The ROTC ceremony was conducted despite the demonstration and after the ceremony completed, the demonstrators left the field of their own accord.

The next day, the faculty-staff board reviewing the suspension adjourned without a decision until the students could be represented by counsel. After re-convening, the board recommended to President Miles of the university that the students "be separated forthwith from the University." The President instead suspended the students for the remainder of the current semester and the next semester with leave to apply for readmission in the following year. The students were allowed to take final examinations off campus and receive credit for their coursework.

The students sued alleging violation of the Civil Rights Act, 42 U.S.C., asking the court to provide temporary and final injunctions compelling the university to reinstate them immediately without any penalties, a judgment declaring the university's Policy on Demonstrations to be void, and damages. The students were from two different parts of the university, some were liberal arts students and some were students of the College of Ceramics.

== Issue ==
Did the court have jurisdiction to hear the case and if so, were the students' civil rights, specifically the right to freedom of expression, violated?

== Answer ==
The court did have jurisdiction to hear the case for the students of the College of Ceramics, a state funded part of the university, but not for the liberal arts students as the university as a whole had insufficient state sponsorship or governance. The court then decided the students' civil rights were not violated.

The court determined the students' civil rights were not violated as (1) they had not adhered to the university demonstration policy by giving prior notice yet prior planning was obvious and such notice could have been given (2) the students who moved, though still demonstrating, were not punished by the university as they were no longer obstructing the ceremony.

== Reasoning of the Court ==
The court specified three reasons why it had jurisdiction to hear the case: (1) the College of Ceramics was almost totally state funded by the State of New York, (2) the state owned the land and building of the College of Ceramics, and (3) the state was involved in the governance of the College of Ceramics. None of these applied to Alfred University as a whole.

== See also ==
- Case law in the United States
