= Long civil rights movement =

Social movement

"Long civil rights movement" is a historiographical argument regarding the timing and substance of the Civil Rights Movement, advanced by American historian Jacquelyn Dowd Hall. The argument was proposed in the article "The Long Civil Rights Movement and the Political Uses of the Past" in The Journal of American History in 2005. Dowd had used the term in a 2001 article, titled "Broadening Our View of the Civil Rights Movement", in the Chronicle of Higher Education. Since 2005, the long civil rights movement argument has attracted substantial attention from scholars and academics that study the 1954-1968 civil rights movement.

The Long civil rights movement argues the length and influence of the Civil Rights Movement in connected social struggles. The Civil Rights Movement was an organized effort to gain legalized equal rights for all Americans. This movement starts with the court case of Brown vs Board of Education in 1954, a turning point for black Americans when legalized segregation was deemed unconstitutional. The Civil Rights Movement has long been associated with this court case as well as Martin Luther King Jr., the Civil Rights Act of 1964, and the Voting Rights Act of 1965. But the "Long Civil Rights Movement" argues that the Civil Rights Movement started in the 1930s and extended beyond the 1960s.

Some argue that the civil rights movement started as early as emancipation and continued through Barack Obama's presidency to present day. Most agree the Long Civil Rights Movement took off with the social reform in the 1930s surrounding the New Deal Era During this time, following up to Brown vs Board of Education, there were many campaigns and other forms of resistance against segregation. In 1954, when the court case, Brown vs Board of Education, found it unconstitutional to segregate in public places, it still took fifteen years for the US to wholly implement it. As schools started to integrate, they started to push once again for resegregation within the school system. As the Civil Rights Act was passed and the movement started to die down, black people continued to face harsh discriminations. In the 1970s and 80s, finding affordable housing, fighting unwilling residential integrating, finding equal job opportunities, fighting labor organizations and welfare rights were a few ways black Americans continued to be discriminated against. While these situations were most often found in the South, they were also relevant problems all over the nation.

In the 1980s, Black people experienced marginalized labor and increasing incarceration. Gerrymandering was a way people manipulated boundaries to stop black people from voting. "Underclass" was a label put on black Americans which showed that they were still thought of as inferior to white people during the 1980s.

Following the 1960s and the major Civil Rights events, many started to correlate Martin Luther King Jr. with extreme radicalism and his anti-Vietnam stance rather than his ideals and efforts towards equality. During this time, many started to neglect everything that had happened in the Civil Rights Movement with some even claiming that racism was insignificant and did not matter. While the Civil Rights Movements made huge strides towards equal rights, not everyone was accepting of the changes. In the 1970s, New Right Conservatism was a movement that followed the Civil Rights Movement and rose during Ronald Reagan's presidency. This caused racial polarization in neighborhoods and other areas of society where people purposefully did not sell to black people or allow black people in certain communities. Polarization is the opposite of diversifying where they actually strived to keep different races separate from each other.

At the beginning of the Civil Rights Movement, its initial progress was a result of private philanthropy, federal dollars, and a forced mobilization of the poor from the government. It was a forced effort where the federal government used money and force to achieve civil equalities. While, the government's involvement to support the civil rights movement was positive, when their involvement was retracted, it left many people who did not support the government's choice originally to revert to their old ways. Many areas of the US went back to opposing the Civil Rights Act as well as other government assisted efforts like helping the poor. The South, especially, continued to nourish Jim Crow Law.

They also formed one party politics that opposed Civil Rights and made it so black people did not have much of a voice. The South was motivated to protect their economy that was built on cheap labor despite what the government had passed as laws and constitutional rights. The civil rights movement is a continuing effort for equality that The Long Civil Rights Movement argues can still be seen in present day. The Black Lives Matter Movement is the modern movement for Civil Rights. This black power movement calls it a "never-ending fight for freedom" as they continue to fight for political, social, and economic equality. Martin Luther King Jr. said, "The racial issue we confront in America is not a sectional but a national problem." The Long Civil Rights Movement is not only a fight extending over a century or more but also a fight that extends not just over the South but over the entire nation.
