= Timeline of African-American history =

The timeline of African-American history traces major events involving African Americans and people of African descent in what became the United States, from the 16th century into the 21st century. It begins with the arrival of enslaved Africans with a Spanish colonial expedition in 1526 and follows the development of slavery in the colonies, Black participation in the American Revolution, the growth of free Black communities and abolitionism, and the American Civil War and emancipation.

Following emancipation, the timeline covers Reconstruction, African-American political participation, white supremacist violence, Jim Crow segregation and disfranchisement, migration, the growth of Black institutions, and cultural and political achievements. Its 20th-century entries include the Great Migration, challenges to racial segregation, the nonviolent civil rights movement and its Montgomery bus boycott, Birmingham campaign and Selma to Montgomery marches, the Civil Rights Act of 1964, the Voting Rights Act of 1965, and the Fair Housing Act of 1968.

Later entries cover continuing developments in politics, civil rights, culture, and racial justice, including the election of Barack Obama as president in 2008, the emergence of the Black Lives Matter movement, nationwide protests following the murder of George Floyd in 2020, and the election of Kamala Harris as vice president.

== 16th century ==
1526

- The first African slaves in what would become the present day United States of America arrived on August 9, 1526, in Winyah Bay, South Carolina. Spanish explorer Lucas Vázquez de Ayllón led around six hundred settlers, including an unknown number of African slaves, in an attempt to start a colony. The attempt failed after a month and Ayllón moved the colony, including the slaves, to what is now the state of Georgia. This colony also failed, but slavery would continue in Georgia until 1865.

1565

- The Spanish colony of St. Augustine in Florida became the first permanent European settlement in what would become the U.S. centuries later. It included an unknown number of enslaved Africans.

== 17th century ==
1619

- The first recorded Africans in English North America arrive when "twenty and odd" men, women and children were brought first to Fort Monroe off the coast of Hampton, Virginia, and then to Jamestown. They had been taken as prizes from a Portuguese slave ship. The group of Africans were treated as indentured servants, and at least one was recorded as eventually owning land in the colony.

1640

- John Punch, a Black indentured servant, ran away with three white servants, James, Gregory, and Victor. After the four were captured, Punch was sentenced to serve Virginian planter Hugh Gwyn for life. This made John Punch the first legally documented slave in colonial Virginia.

1654

- John Casor, a Black man who claimed to have completed his term of indenture, became the first legally recognized slave-for-life in a civil case in colonial Virginia. The court ruled with his master, who said he had an indefinite servitude for life.

1662

- The Colony of Virginia, using the principle of partus sequitur ventrem, proclaimed that children in the colony were born into their mother's social status; therefore children born to enslaved mothers were classified as slaves, regardless of their father's ethnicity or status. This was contrary to English common law for English subjects, which held that children took their father's social status.

1664

- September 20 - The Province of Maryland passes the first law in Colonial America banning interracial marriage.

1670

- Zipporah Potter Atkins, a free woman of color, becomes the first African-American landowner in Boston, and the first Black woman to own land in Colonial America.

1676

- Both free and enslaved African Americans fought in Bacon's Rebellion alongside white indentured servants.

1685

- French king Louis XIV issues the Code Noir ("Black Code"), a slave code which applies to France's overseas colonies, including Louisiana.

== 18th century ==
1705

- The Virginia Slave Codes of 1705 define as slaves all those servants brought into the colony who were not Christian in their original countries, as well as Native American slaves sold by other Indians to colonists.

1712

- April 6 – The New York Slave Revolt of 1712 breaks out.

1738

- First free African-American community: Gracia Real de Santa Teresa de Mose (later named Fort Mose) in Spanish Florida.

1739

- September 9 – In the Stono Rebellion, South Carolina slaves gather at the Stono River to plan an armed march for freedom.

1753

- Benjamin Banneker designed and built the first clock of its type in the Thirteen Colonies. He also created a series of almanacs. He corresponded with Thomas Jefferson and wrote that "blacks were intellectually equal to whites". Banneker worked with Pierre L'Enfant to survey and design a street and urban plan for Washington, D.C.

1760

- Jupiter Hammon has a poem printed, becoming the first published African-American poet.

1770

- March 5 – Crispus Attucks is among the five men killed by a detachment of the 29th Regiment of Foot in the Boston Massacre, a precursor to the American Revolution.

1773

- Phillis Wheatley has her book Poems on Various Subjects, Religious and Moral published.

1774

- As part of a broader non-importation movement aimed at Britain, the First Continental Congress called on all the colonies to ban the importation of slaves, and the colonies pass acts doing so.
- The first black Baptist congregations are organized in the American South: Silver Bluff Baptist Church in South Carolina, and First African Baptist Church near Petersburg, Virginia.

1775

- April 14 – The Society for the Relief of Free Negroes Unlawfully Held in Bondage holds four meetings. It was re-formed in 1784 as the Pennsylvania Abolition Society, and Benjamin Franklin would later serve as its president.
- Thomas Paine publishes one of the earliest and most influential anti-slavery essays in the U.S., called "African Slavery in America."

=== 1776–1783 American Revolution ===
- Thousands of enslaved African Americans in the South escaped to British lines, as they were promised freedom to fight with the British. In South Carolina, 25,000 enslaved African Americans, one-quarter of those held, escaped to the British or otherwise leave their plantations. After the war, many African Americans were evacuated with the British for England; more than 3,000 Black Loyalists are transported with other Loyalists to Nova Scotia and New Brunswick, where they are granted land. Still others go to Jamaica and the West Indies. An estimated 8–10,000 were evacuated from the colonies in these years as free people, about 50 percent of those slaves who defected to the British and about 80 percent of those who survived.
- Many Black Patriots in the North fight with the rebelling colonists during the Revolutionary War.

==== 1777 ====
- July 8 – The Vermont Republic (a sovereign nation at the time) abolishes slavery, the first future state to do so. No slaves were held in Vermont.

==== 1780 ====
- Pennsylvania becomes the first U.S. state to abolish slavery.
- Capt. Paul Cuffe and six other African American residents of Massachusetts successfully petition the state legislature for the right to vote, claiming "no taxation without representation."

==== 1781 ====
- In challenges by Elizabeth Freeman and Quock Walker, two independent county courts in Massachusetts found slavery illegal under the state constitution and declared each to be free persons.

==== 1783 ====
- Massachusetts Supreme Judicial Court affirmed that Massachusetts state constitution had abolished slavery. It ruled that "the granting of rights and privileges [was] wholly incompatible and repugnant to" slavery, in an appeal case arising from the escape of former slave Quock Walker. When the British left New York and Charleston in 1783, they took the last of 5,500 Loyalists to the Caribbean, who brought along with them some 15,000 slaves.

==== 1787 ====
- July 13 – The Northwest Ordinance bans the expansion of slavery into U.S. territories north of the Ohio River and east of the Mississippi River.

==== 1788 ====
- The First African Baptist Church of Savannah, Georgia is organized under Andrew Bryan.

==== 1790–1810 Manumission of slaves ====
- Following the Revolution, numerous slaveholders in the Upper South free their slaves; the percentage of free blacks rises from less than one to 10 percent. By 1810, 75 percent of all blacks in Delaware are free, and 7.2 percent of blacks in Virginia are free.

==== 1791 ====
- February – Major Andrew Ellicott hires Benjamin Banneker, an African-American draftsman, to assist in a survey of the boundaries of the 100-square-mile (260 km^{2}) federal district that would later become the District of Columbia.

==== 1793 ====
- February 12 – The Fugitive Slave Act of 1793 is passed. (See also Fugitive slave laws.)

==== 1794 ====
- March 14 – Eli Whitney is granted a patent on the cotton gin. This enables the cultivation and processing of short-staple cotton to be profitable in the uplands and interior areas of the Deep South; as this cotton can be cultivated in a wide area, the change dramatically increases the need for enslaved labor and leads to the development of King Cotton as the chief commodity crop. To satisfy labor demand, there is a forced migration of one million slaves from the Upper South and coast to the area in the antebellum period, mostly by the domestic slave trade.
- July – Two independent black churches open in Philadelphia: the African Episcopal Church of St. Thomas, with Absalom Jones, and the Bethel African Methodist Episcopal Church, with Richard Allen. The Bethel African Methodist Episcopal Church was the first church of what would become, in 1816, the first independent black denomination in the United States.

== 19th century ==
=== 1800–1859 ===
Early 19th century

- The first Black Codes enacted.

1800

- August 30 – Gabriel Prosser's planned attempt to lead a slave rebellion in Richmond, Virginia is suppressed.

1807

- At the urging of President Thomas Jefferson, Congress passes the Act Prohibiting Importation of Slaves. It makes it a federal crime to import a slave from abroad.

1808

- January 1 – The importation of slaves is a felony. This is the earliest day under the United States Constitution that a law could be made restricting slavery.

1816

- The first separate black denomination of the African Methodist Episcopal Church (AME) is founded by Richard Allen, who is elected its first bishop.
- The American Colonization Society is begun by Robert Finley, to send free African Americans to what is to become Liberia in West Africa.
- The Shockoe Hill African Burying Ground is established in Richmond, VA. With estimated interments of upwards of 22,000, it is likely the largest burial ground for Free People of Color and the enslaved in the United States.

1817

- The First African Baptist Church had its beginnings in 1817 when John Mason Peck and the former enslaved John Berry Meachum began holding church services for African Americans in St. Louis. Meachum founded the First African Baptist Church in 1827. It was the first African-American church west of the Mississippi River. Although there were ordinances preventing blacks from assembling, the congregation grew from 14 people at its founding to 220 people by 1829. Two hundred of the parishioners were slaves, who could only travel to the church and attend services with the permission of their owners.

1820

- March 6 – The Missouri Compromise allows for the entry as states of Maine (free) and Missouri (slave); no more slave states are allowed north of 36°30′.
- The British West Africa Squadron's slave trade suppression activities are assisted by forces from the United States Navy, starting in 1820 with the USS Cyane. With the Webster–Ashburton Treaty of 1842, the relationship is formalised and they jointly run the Africa Squadron.

1821

- The African Methodist Episcopal Zion Church is formed.

1822

- July 14 – Denmark Vesey's planned slave rebellion in Charleston, South Carolina is suppressed (known also as "The Vesey Conspiracy").

1827

- March 16 - Freedom's Journal, the first African American newspaper in the U.S., begins publication.

1829

- September – David Walker begins publication of the abolitionist pamphlet Walker's Appeal.

1830

- October 28 – Josiah Henson, a slave who fled and arrived in Canada, is an author, abolitionist, minister, and the inspiration behind the book Uncle Tom's Cabin.

1831

- William Lloyd Garrison begins publication of the abolitionist newspaper The Liberator. He declares ownership of a slave is a great sin, and must stop immediately.
- August – Nat Turner leads the most successful slave rebellion in U.S. history. The rebellion is suppressed, but only after many deaths.

1832

- Sarah Harris Fayerweather, an aspiring teacher, is admitted to Prudence Crandall's all-girl school in Canterbury, Connecticut, resulting in the first racially integrated schoolhouse in the United States. Her admission led to the school's forcible closure under the Connecticut Black Law of 1833.

1833

- The American Anti-Slavery Society, an abolitionist society, is founded by William Lloyd Garrison and Arthur Tappan. Frederick Douglass becomes a key leader of the society.

1837

- February – The first Institute of Higher Education for African Americans is founded. Founded as the African Institute in February 1837 and renamed the Institute of Coloured Youth (ICY) in April 1837 and now known as Cheyney University of Pennsylvania.

1839

- July 2 – Slaves revolt on the La Amistad, an illegal slave ship, resulting in a hearing before the U.S. Supreme Court (see United States v. The Amistad) and their gaining freedom.

1840

- The Liberty Party breaks away from the American Anti-Slavery Society due to grievances with William Lloyd Garrison's leadership.

1842

- The U.S. Supreme Court rules, in Prigg v. Pennsylvania (1842), that states do not have to offer aid in the hunting or recapture of slaves, greatly weakening the fugitive slave law of 1793.

1843

- June 1 – Isabella Baumfree, a former slave, changes her name to Sojourner Truth and begins to preach for the abolition of slavery.
- August – Henry Highland Garnet delivers his famous speech Call to Rebellion.

1845

- Publication of Narrative of the Life of Frederick Douglass, An American Slave, Written by Himself.

1847

- Frederick Douglass begins publication of the abolitionist newspaper the North Star.
- Joseph Jenkins Roberts of Virginia becomes the first president of Liberia.

1849

- Roberts v. Boston seeks to end racial discrimination in Boston public schools.
- Harriet Tubman escapes from slavery to Philadelphia, and begins helping other slaves to escape via the Underground Railroad.

1850

- September 18 – As part of the Compromise of 1850, Congress passes the Fugitive Slave Act of 1850 which requires any federal official to arrest anyone suspected of being a runaway slave.

1851

- Soujourner Truth gives her "Ain't I a Woman" speech at a women's rights convention in Akron, Ohio.

1852

- March 20 – Uncle Tom's Cabin by Harriet Beecher Stowe is published.

1853

- December – Clotel; or, The President's Daughter, by Williams Wells Brown, is the first novel published by an African-American.

1854

- President Franklin Pierce signs the Kansas–Nebraska Act, which repealed the Missouri Compromise and allowed slaves to be brought to the new territories.
- In opposition to the Kansas–Nebraska Act, the Republican Party is formed with an anti-slavery platform.

1855

- John Mercer Langston is one of the first African Americans elected to public office when elected as a town clerk in Ohio.

1856

- May 21 – The Sacking of Lawrence in Bleeding Kansas.
- May 25 – John Brown, whom Abraham Lincoln called a "misguided fanatic", retaliates for Lawrence's sacking in the Pottawatomie massacre.
- Wilberforce University is founded by collaboration between Methodist Episcopal and African Methodist Episcopal representatives.

1857

- March 6 – In Dred Scott v. Sandford, the U.S. Supreme Court upholds slavery. This decision is regarded as a key cause of the American Civil War.

1859

- Harriet E. Wilson writes the autobiographical novel Our Nig.
- In Ableman v. Booth the U.S. Supreme Court rules that state courts cannot issue rulings that contradict the decisions of federal courts; this decision uphold the Fugitive Slave Act of 1850.
- August 22 - The last known slave ship to arrive to the U.S., the Clotilde, docks in secrecy at Mobile, Alabama.

=== 1860–1874 ===
1861

- April 12 – The American Civil War begins (secessions began in December 1860), and lasts until April 9, 1865. Tens of thousands of enslaved African Americans of all ages escaped to Union lines for freedom. Contraband camps were set up in some areas, where blacks started learning to read and write. Others traveled with the Union Army. By the end of the war, more than 180,000 African Americans, mostly from the South, fought with the Union Army and Navy as members of the US Colored Troops and sailors.
- May 2 – The first North American military unit with African-American officers is the 1st Louisiana Native Guard of the Confederate Army (disbanded in February 1862).
- May 24 – General Benjamin Butler refuses to extradite three escaped slaves, declaring them contraband of war.
- August 6 – The Confiscation Act of 1861 authorizes the confiscation of any Confederate property, including all slaves who fought or worked for the Confederate military.
- August 30 – Frémont Emancipation in Missouri.
- September 11 – Lincoln orders Frémont to rescind the edict.

1862

- March 13 – Act Prohibiting the Return of Slaves.
- April 16 – (Emancipation Day) – District of Columbia Compensated Emancipation Act.
- May 9 – General David Hunter declares emancipation in Georgia, Florida, and South Carolina.
- May 19 – Lincoln rescinds Hunter's order.
- July 17 – Confiscation Act of 1862 frees confiscated slaves.
- September 22 – Lincoln announces the Emancipation Proclamation to go into effect January 1, 1863.

=== 1863–1877 Reconstruction Era ===
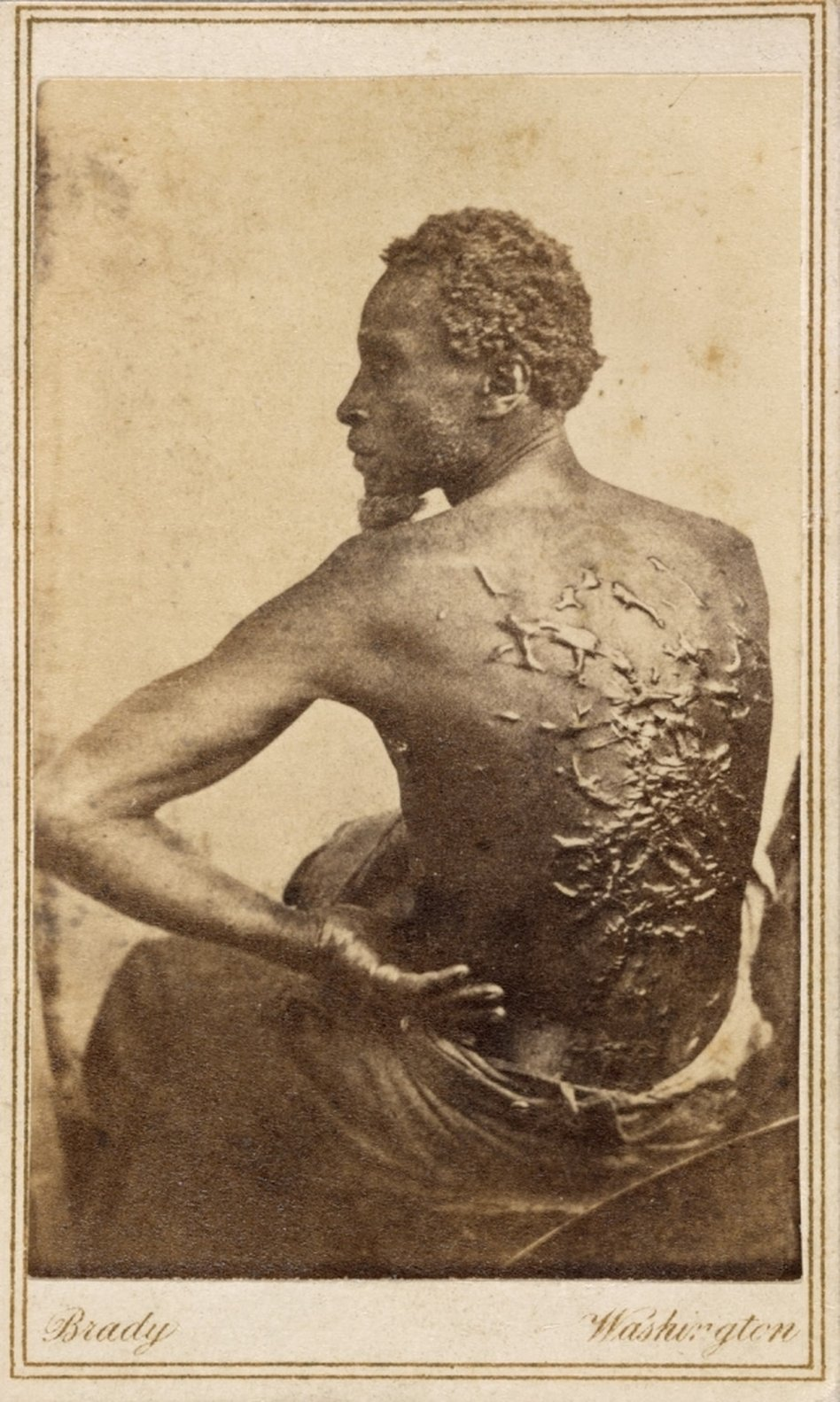
1863 medical examination photo of Gordon showing his scourged back, widely distributed by Abolitionists to expose the brutality of slavery

1863

- January 1 – The Emancipation Proclamation goes into effect, changing the legal status, as recognized by the United States federal government, of 3 million slaves in the designated areas of the South from "slave" to "free."
- January 31 – U.S. Army commissions the 1st South Carolina Volunteers, a combat unit made up of escaped slaves.
- May 22 – The U.S. Army recruits United States Colored Troops. (The 54th Massachusetts Volunteer Regiment would be featured in the 1989 film Glory.)
- June 1 – Harriet Tubman the 2nd South Carolina Volunteers liberate 750 people with the Raid at Combahee Ferry.
- July 13–16 – Ethnic Irish immigrants protests against the draft in New York City turn into riots against blacks, the New York Draft Riots.
- July 18 – The Second Battle of Fort Wagner begins when the 54th Regiment Massachusetts Volunteer Infantry, an African-American military unit, led by white Colonel Robert Gould Shaw, attacked a Confederate fort at Morris Island, South Carolina. The attack on Fort Wagner by the 54th Regiment Massachusetts Volunteer Infantry failed to take the fort and Gould was killed in the battle. However, the fort was abandoned by the Confederates on September 7, 1863, after many could not stand the constant weeks of bombardment and the smell of dead Union black soldiers sickening them.

1864

- April 12 – The Battle of Fort Pillow, which results in controversy about whether a massacre of surrendered African-American troops was conducted or condoned.
- October 13 – Controversial election results in approval of Maryland Constitution of 1864; emancipation in Maryland.

1865

- January 16 – Sherman's Special Field Orders, No. 15 allocate a tract of land in coastal South Carolina and Georgia for Black-only settlement.
- January 31 – The United States Congress passes the Thirteenth Amendment to the United States Constitution, abolishing slavery and submits it to the states for ratification.
- March 3 – Congress passes the bill that forms the Freedman's Bureau; mandates distribution of "not more than forty acres" of confiscated land to all loyal freedmen and refugees.
- May 29 – Andrew Johnson amnesty proclamation initiates return of land to pre-war owners.
- December 18 – The Thirteenth Amendment to the United States Constitution prohibits slavery except as punishment for crime; emancipation in Delaware and Kentucky.
- Shaw Institute is founded in Raleigh, North Carolina, as the first black college in the South.
- Atlanta College is founded.
- Southern states pass Black Codes that restrict the freedmen, who were emancipated but not yet full citizens.

1866

- April 9 – The Civil Rights Act of 1866 is passed by Congress over Johnson's presidential veto. All persons born in the United States are now citizens.
- The Ku Klux Klan is formed in Pulaski, Tennessee, made up of white Confederate veterans; it becomes a paramilitary insurgent group to enforce white supremacy.
- May 1–3 – The Memphis Massacre transpires.
- July – New Orleans Riot: white citizens riot against blacks.
- July 21 – Southern Homestead Act of 1866 opens 46 million acres of land in Alabama, Arkansas, Florida, Louisiana, and Mississippi; African Americans have priority access until January 1, 1877.
- September 21 – The U.S. Army regiment of Buffalo Soldiers (African Americans) is formed.
- One version of the Second Freedmen's Bureau Act is vetoed and fails; another is vetoed and passed via override in July.

1867

- February 14 – Augusta Institute, now known as Morehouse College, is founded in the basement of Springfield Baptist Church in Augusta, Georgia.
- March 2 – Howard University is founded in Washington, D.C.

1868

- April 1 – Hampton Institute is founded in Hampton, Virginia.
- July 9 – The Fourteenth Amendment to the United States Constitution's Section 1 requires due process and equal protection.
- Through 1877, whites attack black and white Republicans to suppress voting. Every election cycle is accompanied by violence, increasing in the 1870s.
- Elizabeth Keckly publishes Behind the Scenes (or, Thirty Years a Slave and Four Years in the White House).

1870

- February 3 – The Fifteenth Amendment to the United States Constitution guarantees the right of male citizens of the United States to vote regardless of race, color or previous condition of servitude.
- February 25 – Hiram Rhodes Revels becomes the first black member of the Senate (see African Americans in the United States Congress).
- Christian Methodist Episcopal Church founded.
- First two Enforcement Acts.

1871

- October 10 – Octavius Catto, a civil rights activist, is murdered during harassment of blacks on Election Day in Philadelphia.
- US Civil Rights Act of 1871 passed, also known as the Klan Act and Third Enforcement Act.

1872

- December 11 – P. B. S. Pinchback is sworn in as the first black member of the U.S. House of Representatives.
- Disputed gubernatorial election in Louisiana cause political violence for more than two years. Both Republican and Democratic governors hold inaugurations and certify local officials.
- Elijah McCoy patented his first invention, an automatic lubricator that supplied oil to moving parts while a machine was still operating.

1873

- April 14 – In the Slaughter-House Cases the U.S. Supreme Court votes 5–4 for a narrow reading of the Fourteenth Amendment. The court also discusses dual citizenship: State citizens and U.S. citizens.
- Easter – The Colfax Massacre; more than 100 blacks in the Red River area of Louisiana are killed when attacked by white militia after defending Republicans in local office – continuing controversy from gubernatorial election.
- The Coushatta Massacre transpires. Republican officeholders are run out of town and murdered by white militia before leaving the state – four of six were relatives of a Louisiana state senator, a northerner who had settled in the South, married into a local family and established a plantation. Five to twenty black witnesses are also killed.

1874

- Founding of paramilitary groups that act as the "military arm of the Democratic Party": the White League in Louisiana and the Red Shirts in Mississippi, and North and South Carolina. They terrorize blacks and Republicans, turning them out of office, killing some, disrupting rallies, and suppressing voting.
- September – In New Orleans, continuing political violence erupts related to the still-contested gubernatorial election of 1872. Thousands of the White League armed militia march into New Orleans, then the seat of government, where they outnumber the integrated city police and black state militia forces. They defeat Republican forces and demand that Gov. Kellogg leave office. The Democratic candidate McEnery is installed and White Leaguers occupy the capitol, state house and arsenal. This was called the "Battle of Liberty Place". The White League and McEnery withdraw after three days in advance of federal troops arriving to reinforce the Republican state government.

=== 1875–1899 ===
1875

- March 1 – Civil Rights Act of 1875 signed.
- The Mississippi Plan to intimidate blacks and suppress black voter registration and voting.

1876

- Lewis Latimer prepared drawings for Alexander Graham Bell's application for a telephone patent.
- July 8 – The Hamburg Massacre occurs when local people riot against African Americans who were trying to celebrate the Fourth of July.
- varied – White Democrats regain power in many southern state legislatures and pass the first Jim Crow laws.

1877

- With the Compromise of 1877, Republican Rutherford B. Hayes withdraws federal troops from the South in exchange for being elected President of the United States, causing the collapse of the last three remaining Republican state governments. The compromise formally ends the Reconstruction Era.

1879

- Spring – Thousands of African Americans refuse to live under segregation in the South and migrate to Kansas. They become known as Exodusters.

1880

- In Strauder v. West Virginia, the U.S. Supreme Court rules that African Americans could not be excluded from juries.
- During the 1880s, African Americans in the South reach a peak of numbers in being elected and holding local offices, even while white Democrats are working to assert control at state level.

1881

- April 11 – Spelman Seminary is founded as the Atlanta Baptist Female Seminary.
- July 4 – Booker T. Washington opens the Tuskegee Normal and Industrial Institute in Tuskegee, Alabama.

1882

- Lewis Latimer invented the first long-lasting filament for light bulbs and installed his lighting system in New York City, Philadelphia, and Canada. Later, he became one of the 28 members of Thomas Edison's Pioneers.
- A biracial populist coalition achieves power in Virginia (briefly). The legislature founds the first public college for African Americans, Virginia Normal and Collegiate Institute, as well as the first mental hospital for African Americans, both near Petersburg, Virginia. The hospital was established in December 1869, at Howard's Grove Hospital, a former Confederate unit, but is moved to a new campus in 1882.

1883

- October 16 – In Civil Rights Cases, the U.S. Supreme Court strikes down the Civil Rights Act of 1875 as unconstitutional.

1884

- Mark Twain's Adventures of Huckleberry Finn is published, featuring the admirable African-American character Jim.
- Judy W. Reed, of Washington, D.C., and Sarah E. Goode, of Chicago, are the first African-American women inventors to receive patents. Signed with an "X", Reed's patent no. 305,474, granted September 23, 1884, is for a dough kneader and roller. Goode's patent for a cabinet bed, patent no. 322,177, is issued on July 14, 1885. Goode, the owner of a Chicago furniture store, invented a folding bed that could be formed into a desk when not in use.
- Ida B. Wells sues the Chesapeake, Ohio & South Western Railroad Company for its use of segregated "Jim Crow" cars.

1886

- Norris Wright Cuney becomes the chairman of the Texas Republican Party, the most powerful role held by any African American in the South during the 19th century.

1887

- October 3 – The State Normal School for Colored Students, which would become Florida A&M University, is founded.

1890

- Mississippi, with a white Democrat-dominated legislature, passes a new constitution that effectively disfranchises most blacks through voter registration and electoral requirements, e.g., poll taxes, residency tests and literacy tests. This shuts them out of the political process, including service on juries and in local offices.
- By 1900 two-thirds of the farmers in the bottomlands of the Mississippi Delta are African Americans who cleared and bought land after the Civil War.

1892

- Ida B. Wells publishes her pamphlet Southern Horrors: Lynch Law in All Its Phases.

1893

- Daniel Hale Williams performed open-heart surgery in 1893 and founded Provident Hospital in Chicago, the first with an interracial staff.

1895

- September 18 – Booker T. Washington delivers his Atlanta Compromise address at the Cotton States and International Exposition in Atlanta, Georgia.
- W. E. B. Du Bois becomes the first African-American to be earn a Ph.D. from Harvard University.

1896

- May 18 – In Plessy v. Ferguson, the U.S. Supreme Court upholds de jure racial segregation of "separate but equal" facilities. (see "Jim Crow laws" for historical discussion).
- The National Association of Colored Women is formed by the merger of smaller groups.
- As one of the earliest Black Hebrew Israelites in the United States, William Saunders Crowdy establishes the Church of God and Saints of Christ.
- George Washington Carver is invited by Booker T. Washington to head the Agricultural Department at what would become Tuskegee University. His work would revolutionize farming – he found about 300 uses for peanuts.

1898

- Louisiana enacts the first statewide grandfather clause that provides exemption for illiterate whites to voter registration literacy test requirements.
- In Williams v. Mississippi the U.S. Supreme Court upholds the voter registration and election provisions of Mississippi's constitution because they applied to all citizens. Effectively, however, they disenfranchise blacks and poor whites. The result is that other southern states copy these provisions in their new constitutions and amendments through 1908, disfranchising most African Americans and tens of thousands of poor whites until the 1960s.
- November 10 – The Wilmington massacre begins in Wilmington, North Carolina, resulting in considerable loss of life and property in the African-American community and the installation of a white supremacist Democratic Party regime.

1899

- September 18 – The "Maple Leaf Rag" is an early ragtime composition for piano by Scott Joplin.

== 20th century ==
=== 1900–1949 ===
1900

- Since the Civil War, 30,000 African-American teachers had been trained and put to work in the South. The majority of blacks had become literate.

1901

- Booker T. Washington's autobiography Up from Slavery is published.
- Benjamin Tillman, senator from South Carolina, comments on Theodore Roosevelt's dining with Booker T. Washington: "The action of President Roosevelt in entertaining that nigger will necessitate our killing a thousand niggers in the South before they learn their place again."

1903

- September – W. E. B. Du Bois's article The Talented Tenth published.
- W. E. B. Du Bois's seminal work The Souls of Black Folk is published.

1904

- May 15 – Sigma Pi Phi, the first African-American Greek-letter organization, is founded by African-American men as a professional organization, in Philadelphia, Pennsylvania.
- Orlando, Florida hires its first black postman.

1905

- July 11 – First meeting of the Niagara Movement, an interracial group to work for civil rights.

1906

- The Brownsville Affair, which eventually involves President Roosevelt.
- December 4 – African-American men found Alpha Phi Alpha at Cornell University, the first intercollegiate fraternity for African-American men.

1907

- National Primitive Baptist Convention of the U.S.A. formed.

1908

- December 26 – Jack Johnson wins the World Heavyweight Title.
- Alpha Kappa Alpha at Howard University; African-American college women found the first college sorority for African-American women.

1909

- February 12 – Planned first meeting of group which would become the National Association for the Advancement of Colored People (NAACP), an interracial group devoted to civil rights. The meeting actually occurs on May 31, but February 12 is normally cited as the NAACP's founding date.
- May 31 – The National Negro Committee meets and is formed; it will be the precursor to the NAACP.
- August 14 – A lynch mob moves through Springfield, Illinois burning the homes and businesses of black people and black sympathisers, killing many.

1910

- May 30 – The National Negro Committee chooses "National Association for the Advancement of Colored People" as its organization name.
- September 29 – Committee on Urban Conditions Among Negroes formed; the next year it will merge with other groups to form the National Urban League.
- The NAACP begins publishing The Crisis.

1911

- January 5 – Kappa Alpha Psi fraternity was founded at Indiana University.
- November 17 – Omega Psi Phi fraternity was founded at Howard University.

1913

- The Moorish Science Temple of America, a religious organization, is founded by Noble Drew Ali (Timothy Drew).
- January 13 – Delta Sigma Theta sorority was founded at Howard University

1914

- January 9 – Phi Beta Sigma fraternity was founded at Howard University
- Newly elected president Woodrow Wilson orders physical re-segregation of federal workplaces and employment after nearly 50 years of integrated facilities.

1915

- February 8 – The Birth of a Nation is released to film theaters. The NAACP protests in cities across the country, convincing some not to show the film.
- June 21 – In Guinn v. United States, the U.S. Supreme Court rules against grandfather clauses used to deny blacks the right to vote.
- September 9 – Carter G. Woodson founds the Association for the Study of African American Life and History in Chicago.
- A schism from the National Baptist Convention, USA, Inc. forms the National Baptist Convention of America, Inc.

1916

- January – Carter Woodson and the Association for the Study of Negro Life and History begins publishing the Journal of Negro History, the first academic journal devoted to the study of African-American history.
- March 23 – Marcus Garvey arrives in the U.S. (see Garveyism).
- Los Angeles hires the country's first black female police officer.
- The Great Migration begins and lasts until 1940. Approximately one and a half million African Americans move from the Southern United States to the North and Midwest. More than five million migrate in the Second Great Migration from 1940 to 1970, which includes more destinations in California and the West.

1917

- May–June – East St. Louis Riot.
- August 23 – Houston Riot.
- In Buchanan v. Warley, the U.S. Supreme Court unanimously rules that a ban on selling property in white-majority neighborhoods to black people and vice versa violates the Fourteenth Amendment to the United States Constitution.

1918

- Mary Turner was a 33-year-old lynched in Lowndes County, Georgia who was eight months pregnant. Turner and her child were murdered after she publicly denounced the extrajudicial killing of her husband by a mob. Her death is considered a stark example of racially motivated mob violence in the American south, and was referenced by the NAACP's anti-lynching campaign of the 1920s, 1930s and 1940s.

1919

- Summer – Red Summer of 1919 riots: Chicago, Washington, D.C.; Knoxville, Indianapolis, and elsewhere.
- September 28 – Omaha Race Riot of 1919, Nebraska.
- October 1–5 – Elaine massacre, Phillips County, Arkansas. Numerous blacks are convicted by an all-white jury or plead guilty. In Moore v. Dempsey (1923), the U.S. Supreme Court overturns six convictions for denial of due process under the Fourteenth Amendment.

1920

- February 13 – Negro National League (1920–1931) established.
- Fritz Pollard and Bobby Marshall are the first two African-American players in the National Football League (NFL). Pollard goes on to become the first African-American coach in the NFL.
- January 16 – Zeta Phi Beta sorority founded at Howard University

1921

- May 23 – Shuffle Along is the first major African-American hit musical on Broadway.
- May 31 – Tulsa race massacre, Oklahoma
- Bessie Coleman becomes the first African American to earn a pilot's license.

1922

- November 12 – Sigma Gamma Rho sorority, was founded at Butler University.

1923

- Garrett A. Morgan invented and patented the first automatic three-position traffic light.
- January 1–7 – Rosewood massacre: Six African Americans and two whites die in a week of violence when a white woman in Rosewood, Florida, claims she was beaten and raped by a black man.
- February 19 – In Moore v. Dempsey, the U.S. Supreme Court holds that mob-dominated trials violate the Due Process Clause of the Fourteenth Amendment.
- Jean Toomer's novel Cane is published.

1924

- Knights of Columbus commissions and publishes The Gift of Black Folk: The Negroes in the Making of America by civil rights activist and NAACP cofounder W. E. B. Du Bois as part of the organization's Racial Contribution Series.
- Spelman Seminary becomes Spelman College.

=== 1925–1949 ===
1925

- Spring – American Negro Labor Congress is founded.
- August 8 – 35,000 Ku Klux Klan members march in Washington, D.C. (see List of protest marches on Washington, D.C.)
- Countee Cullen publishes his first collection of poems in Color.
- Brotherhood of Sleeping Car Porters is organized.
- The Harlem Renaissance (also known as the New Negro Movement) is named after the anthology The New Negro, edited by Alain Locke .

1926

- The Harlem Globetrotters are founded.
- Historian Carter G. Woodson proposes Negro History Week.
- Corrigan v Buckley challenges deed restrictions preventing a white seller from selling to a black buyer. The U.S. Supreme Court rules in favor of Buckley, stating that the Fourteenth Amendment does not apply because Washington, DC is a city and not a state, thereby rendering the Due Process Clause inapplicable. Also, that the Due Process Clause does not apply to private agreements.

1928

- Claude McKay's Home to Harlem wins the Harmon Gold Award for Literature.

1929

- The League of United Latin American Citizens, the first organization to fight for the civil rights of Latino Americans, is founded in Corpus Christi, Texas.
- John Hope becomes president of Atlanta University. Graduate classes are offered in the liberal arts, and Atlanta University becomes the first predominantly black university to offer graduate education.
- Hallelujah! is released, one of the first films to star an all-black cast.

1930

- August 7 – Thomas Shipp and Abram Smith were African-American men lynched in Marion, Indiana, after being taken from jail and beaten by a mob. They had been arrested that night as suspects in a robbery, murder and rape case. A third African-American suspect, 16-year-old James Cameron, had also been arrested and narrowly escaped being killed by the mob. He later became a civil rights activist.
- The League of Struggle for Negro Rights is founded in New York City.
- Jessie Daniel Ames forms the Association of Southern Women for the Prevention of Lynching. She gets 40,000 white women to sign a pledge against lynching and for change in the South.

1931

- March 25 – Scottsboro Boys arrested in what would become a nationally controversial case.
- Walter Francis White becomes the executive secretary of the NAACP.

1932

- The Tuskegee Study of Untreated Syphilis in the Negro Male begins at Tuskegee University.

1933

- Hocutt v. Wilson unsuccessfully challenged segregation in higher education in the United States.

1934

- Wallace D. Fard, leader of the Nation of Islam, mysteriously disappears. He is succeeded by Elijah Muhammad.

1935

- June 18 – In Murray v. Pearson, Thurgood Marshall and Charles Hamilton Houston of the NAACP successfully argue the landmark case in Maryland to open admissions to the segregated University of Maryland School of Law on the basis of equal protection under the Fourteenth Amendment.

1936

- August – American sprinter Jesse Owens wins four gold medals at the 1936 Summer Olympics in Berlin.

1937

- Zora Neale Hurston writes the novel Their Eyes Were Watching God.
- Southern Negro Youth Congress founded.
- Joe Louis becomes first African-American heavyweight boxing world champion since Jack Johnson.

1938

- October – Negro National Congress meets at the Metropolitan Opera House in Philadelphia, Pennsylvania.
- Missouri ex rel. Gaines v. Canada

1939

- Easter Sunday – Marian Anderson performs on the steps of the Lincoln Memorial in Washington, D.C. at the instigation of Secretary of Interior Harold Ickes after the Daughters of the American Revolution (DAR) refused permission for Anderson to sing to an integrated audience in Constitution Hall and the federally controlled District of Columbia Board of Education declined a request to use the auditorium of a white public high school.
- Billie Holiday first performs "Strange Fruit" in New York City. The song, a protest against lynching written by Abel Meeropol under the pen name Lewis Allan, became a signature song for Holiday.
- The Little League is formed, becoming the nation's first non-segregated youth sport.
- August 21 – Five African-American men recruited and trained by African-American attorney Samuel Wilbert Tucker conduct a sit-in at the then-segregated Alexandria, Virginia, library and are arrested after being refused library cards.
- September 21 – Followers of Father Divine and the International Peace Mission Movement join with workers to protest racially unfair hiring practices by conducting "a kind of customers' nickel sit down strike" in a restaurant.

=== 1940s to 1970 ===
- Second Great Migration – In multiple acts of resistance and in response to factory labor shortages in World War II, more than 5 million African Americans leave the violence and segregation of the South for jobs, education, and the chance to vote in northern, midwestern, and western cities (mainly to the West Coast).

1940

- February 12 – In Chambers v. Florida, the U.S. Supreme Court frees three black men who were coerced into confessing to a murder.
- February 29 – Hattie McDaniel becomes the first African-American to win an Academy Award. She wins Best Supporting Actress for her performance as Mammy in Gone with the Wind.
- October 25 – Benjamin O. Davis Sr. is promoted to be the first African-American general in the U.S. Army.
- Richard Wright authors Native Son.
- NAACP Legal Defense and Educational Fund is formed.

1941

- January 25 – A. Philip Randolph proposes a March on Washington, effectively beginning the March on Washington Movement.
- early 1941 – U.S. Army forms African-American air combat units, the Tuskegee Airmen. The Tuskegee Airmen were involved in 15,000 combat sorties, winning 150 Distinguished Flying Crosses, 744 Air Medals, 8 Purple Hearts, and 14 Bronze Stars.
- June 25 – President Franklin Delano Roosevelt issues Executive Order 8802, the "Fair Employment Act", to require equal treatment and training of all employees by defense contractors.
- Mitchell v US – the Interstate Commerce Clause is used to successfully desegregate seating on trains.

1942

- Six non-violence activists in the Fellowship of Reconciliation (Bernice Fisher, James Russell Robinson, George Houser, James Farmer Jr., Joe Guinn and Homer Jack) found the Committee on Racial Equality, which becomes the Congress of Racial Equality.

1943

- Doctor Charles R. Drew developed techniques for separating and storing blood. He was the head of an American Red Cross effort to collect blood for American armed forces. He was the chief surgeon of Howard University's medical school and professor of surgery. His achievements were recognized when he became the first African-American surgeon to serve as an examiner on the American Board of Surgery.
- The 1943 Detroit race riot erupts in Detroit, Michigan.
- Lena Horne stars in the all African-American film Stormy Weather.

1944

- April 3 – In Smith v. Allwright, the U.S. Supreme Court rules that the whites-only Democratic Party primary in Texas was unconstitutional.
- April 25 – The United Negro College Fund is incorporated.
- July 17 – Port Chicago disaster, which led to the Port Chicago mutiny.
- August 1–7 – The Philadelphia transit strike of 1944, a strike by white transit workers protesting against job advancement by black workers, is broken by the U.S. military under the provisions of the Smith-Connally Act.
- September 3 – Recy Taylor kidnapped and gang-raped in Abbeville by six white men, who later confessed to the crimes but were never charged. The case was investigated by Rosa Parks and provided an early organizational spark for the Montgomery bus boycott.
- November 7 – Adam Clayton Powell Jr. is elected to the U.S. House of Representatives from Harlem, New York.
- Miami hires its first black police officers.

=== 1945–1975 The Civil Rights Movement ===
1945

- April 5–6 – Freeman Field Mutiny, in which black officers of the U.S. Army Air Corps attempt to desegregate an all-white officers' club in Indiana.
- August – The first issue of Ebony.

1946

- June 3 – In Morgan v. Virginia, the U.S. Supreme Court invalidates provisions of the Virginia Code which require the separation of white and colored passengers where applied to interstate bus transport. The state law is unconstitutional insofar as it is burdening interstate commerce – an area of federal jurisdiction.
- In Florida, Daytona Beach, DeLand, Sanford, Fort Myers, Tampa, and Gainesville all have black police officers. So does Little Rock, Arkansas; Louisville, Kentucky; Charlotte, North Carolina; Austin, Houston, Dallas, San Antonio in Texas; Richmond, Virginia; Chattanooga and Knoxville in Tennessee.
- Renowned actor/singer Paul Robeson founds the American Crusade Against Lynching.

1947

- April 9 – The Congress of Racial Equality (CORE) sends 16 men on the Journey of Reconciliation.
- April 15 – Jackie Robinson plays his first game for the Brooklyn Dodgers, becoming the first black baseball player in professional baseball in 60 years.
- John Hope Franklin authors the non-fiction book From Slavery to Freedom.

1948

- United Nations, Article 4 of the Universal Declaration of Human Rights bans slavery globally.
- January 12 – In Sipuel v. Board of Regents of Univ. of Okla., the U.S. Supreme Court rules that the State of Oklahoma and the University of Oklahoma Law School could not deny admission based on race ("color").
- May 3 – In Shelley v. Kraemer and companion case Hurd v. Hodge, the U.S. Supreme Court rules that the government cannot enforce racially restrictive covenants and asserts that they are in conflict with the nation's public policy.
- July 12 – Hubert Humphrey makes a controversial speech in favor of American civil rights at the Democratic National Convention.
- July 26 – President Harry S. Truman issues Executive Order 9981 ordering the end of racial discrimination in the Armed Forces. Desegregation comes after 1950.
- Atlanta hires its first black police officers.

1949

- January 20 – Civil Rights Congress protests the second inauguration of Harry S. Truman.

=== 1950–1959 ===
1950

- June 5 – In McLaurin v. Oklahoma State Regents the U.S. Supreme Court rules that a public institution of higher learning could not provide different treatment to a student solely because of his race.
- June 5 – In Sweatt v. Painter the U.S. Supreme Court rules that a separate-but-equal Texas law school was actually unequal, partly in that it deprived black students from the collegiality of future white lawyers.
- June 5 – In Henderson v. United States the U.S. Supreme Court abolishes segregation in railroad dining cars.
- September 15 – University of Virginia, under a federal court order, admits a black student to its law school.
- The Leadership Conference on Civil Rights is created in Washington, DC to promote the enactment and enforcement of effective civil rights legislation and policy.
- Orlando, Florida, hires its first black police officers.
- Ralph Bunche wins the 1950 Nobel Peace Prize.
- Chuck Cooper, Nathaniel Clifton and Earl Lloyd break the barriers into the NBA.

1951

- February 2 and 5 – Execution of the Martinsville Seven.
- February 15 – Maryland legislature ends segregation on trains and boats; meanwhile Georgia legislature votes to deny funds to schools that integrate.
- April 23 – High school students in Farmville, Virginia, go on strike: the case Davis v. County School Board of Prince Edward County is heard by the U.S. Supreme Court in 1954 as part of Brown v. Board of Education.
- June 23 – A Federal Court ruling upholds segregation in SC public schools.
- July 11 – White residents riot in Cicero, Illinois when a black family tries to move into an apartment in the all-white suburb of Chicago; National Guard disperses them July 1.
- July 26 – The United States Army high command announces it will desegregate the Army.
- December 17 – "We Charge Genocide" petition presented to United Nations by the Civil Rights Congress accuses United States of violating the Genocide Convention.
- December 24 – The home of NAACP activists Harry and Harriette Moore in Mims, Florida, is bombed by KKK group; both die of injuries.
- December 28 – The Regional Council of Negro Leadership (RCNL) is founded in Cleveland, Mississippi by T. R. M. Howard, Amzie Moore, Aaron Henry, and other civil rights activists. Assisted by member Medgar Evers, the RCNL distributed more than 50,000 bumper stickers bearing the slogan, "Don't Buy Gas Where you Can't Use the Restroom." This campaign successfully pressured many Mississippi service stations to provide restrooms for blacks.

1952

- January 5 – Governor of Georgia Herman Talmadge criticizes television shows for depicting blacks and whites as equal.
- January 28 – Briggs v. Elliott: after a District Court had ordered separate but equal school facilities in South Carolina, the U.S. Supreme Court agrees to hear the case as part of Brown v. Board of Education.
- March 7 – Another federal court upholds segregated education laws in Virginia.
- April 1 – Chancellor Collins J. Seitz finds for the black plaintiffs (Gebhart v. Belton, Gebhart v. Bulah) and orders the integration of Hockessin elementary and Claymont High School in Delaware based on assessment of "separate but equal" public school facilities required by the Delaware constitution.
- September 4 – Eleven black students attend the first day of school at Claymont High School, Delaware, becoming the first black students in the 17 segregated states to integrate a white public school. The day occurs without incident or notice by the community.
- September 5 – The Delaware State Attorney General informs Claymont Superintendent Stahl that the black students will have to go home because the case is being appealed. Stahl, the School Board and the faculty refuse and the students remain. The two Delaware cases are argued before the Warren U.S. Supreme Court by Redding, Greenberg and Marshall and are used as an example of how integration can be achieved peacefully. It was a primary influence in the Brown v. Board case. The students become active in sports, music and theater. The first two black students graduated in June 1954 just one month after the Brown v. Board case.
- Ralph Ellison authors the novel Invisible Man, which wins the National Book Award.

1953

- June 8 – The U.S. Supreme Court strikes down segregation in Washington, DC restaurants.
- August 13 – Executive Order 10479 signed by President Dwight D. Eisenhower establishes the anti-discrimination Committee on Government Contracts.
- September 1 – In the landmark case Sarah Keys v. Carolina Coach Company, WAC Sarah Keys, represented by civil rights lawyer Dovey Roundtree, becomes the first black to challenge "separate but equal" in bus segregation before the Interstate Commerce Commission.
- James Baldwin's semi-autobiographical novel Go Tell It on the Mountain is published.

1954

- May 3 – In Hernandez v. Texas, the U.S. Supreme Court rules that Mexican Americans and all other racial groups in the United States are entitled to equal protection under the 14th Amendment to the U.S. Constitution.
- May 17 – The U.S. Supreme Court rules against the "separate but equal" doctrine in Brown v. Board of Education of Topeka, Kans. and in Bolling v. Sharpe, thus overturning Plessy v. Ferguson.
- July 11 – The first White Citizens' Council meeting takes place, in Mississippi.
- July 30 – At a special meeting in Jackson, Mississippi called by Governor Hugh White, T.R.M. Howard of the Regional Council of Negro Leadership, along with nearly one hundred other black leaders, publicly refuse to support a segregationist plan to maintain "separate but equal" in exchange for a crash program to increase spending on black schools.
- September 2 – In Montgomery, Alabama, 23 black children are prevented from attending all-white elementary schools, defying the recent U.S. Supreme Court ruling Brownv. Board of Education.
- September 7 – District of Columbia ends segregated education; Baltimore, Maryland follows suit on September 8.
- September 15 – Protests by white parents in White Sulphur Springs, WV force schools to postpone desegregation another year.
- September 16 – Mississippi responds by abolishing all public schools with an amendment to its State Constitution.
- September 30 – Integration of a high school in Milford, Delaware collapses when white students boycott classes.
- October 4 – Student demonstrations take place against integration of Washington, DC public schools.
- October 19 – Federal judge upholds an Oklahoma law requiring African-American candidates to be identified on voting ballots as "negro".
- October 30 – Desegregation of U.S. Armed Forces said to be complete.
- November – Charles Diggs Jr., of Detroit is elected to Congress, the first African American elected from Michigan.
- Frankie Muse Freeman is the lead attorney for the landmark NAACP case Davis et al. v. the St. Louis Housing Authority, which ended legal racial discrimination in public housing with the city. Constance Baker Motley was also an attorney for NAACP: it was a rarity to have two women attorneys leading such a high-profile case.

1955

- January 7 – Marian Anderson (of 1939 fame) becomes the first African American to perform with the New York Metropolitan Opera.
- January 15 – President Dwight D. Eisenhower signs Executive Order 10590, establishing the President's Committee on Government Policy to enforce a nondiscrimination policy in Federal employment.
- January 20 – Demonstrators from CORE and Morgan State University stage a successful sit-in to desegregate Read's Drug Store in Baltimore, Maryland.
- April 5 – Mississippi passes a law penalizing white students who attend school with blacks with jail and fines.
- May 7 – NAACP and Regional Council of Negro Leadership activist Reverend George W. Lee is killed in Belzoni, Mississippi.
- May 31 – The U.S. Supreme Court rules in "Brown II" that desegregation must occur with "all deliberate speed".
- June 8 – University of Oklahoma decides to allow black students.
- June 23 – Virginia governor and Board of Education decide to continue segregated schools into 1956.
- June 29 – The NAACP wins a U.S. Supreme Court suit which orders the University of Alabama to admit Autherine Lucy.
- July 11 – Georgia Board of Education orders that any teacher supporting integration be fired.
- July 14 – A Federal Appeals Court overturns segregation on Columbia, SC buses.
- August 1 – Georgia Board of Education fires all black teachers who are members of the NAACP.
- August 13 – Regional Council of Negro Leadership registration activist Lamar Smith is murdered in Brookhaven, Mississippi.
- August 28 – Teenager Emmett Till is killed for whistling at a white woman in Money, Mississippi.
- November 7 – The Interstate Commerce Commission bans bus segregation in interstate travel in Sarah Keys v. Carolina Coach Company, extending the logic of Brown v. Board to the area of bus travel across state lines. On the same day, the U.S. Supreme Court bans segregation on public parks and playgrounds. The governor of Georgia responds that his state would "get out of the park business" rather than allow playgrounds to be desegregated.
- December 1 – Rosa Parks refuses to give up her seat on a bus, starting the Montgomery bus boycott. This occurs nine months after 15-year-old high school student Claudette Colvin became the first to refuse to give up her seat. Colvin's was the legal case which eventually ended the practice in Montgomery.
- Roy Wilkins becomes the NAACP executive secretary.

1956

- January 2 – Georgia Tech president Blake R. Van Leer stands up to Governor Marvin Griffin threats to bar Georgia Tech and Pittsburgh player Bobby Grier over segregation.
- January 9 – Virginia voters and representatives decide to fund private schools with state money to maintain segregation.
- January 16 – FBI Director J. Edgar Hoover writes a rare open letter of complaint directed to civil rights leader T. R. M. Howard after Howard charged in a speech that the "FBI can pick up pieces of a fallen airplane on the slopes of a Colorado mountain and find the man who caused the crash, but they can't find a white man when he kills a Negro in the South."
- January 24 – Governors of Georgia, Mississippi, South Carolina and Virginia agree to block integration of schools.
- February 1 – Virginia legislature passes a resolution that the U.S. Supreme Court integration decision was an "illegal encroachment".
- February 3 – Autherine Lucy is admitted to the University of Alabama. Whites riot for days, and she is suspended. Later, she is expelled for her part in further legal action against the university.
- February 24 – The policy of Massive Resistance is declared by U.S. Senator Harry F. Byrd, Sr.
- February/March – The Southern Manifesto, opposing integration of schools, is created and signed by members of the Congressional delegations of Southern states, including 19 senators and 81 members of the House of Representatives, notably the entire delegations of the states of Alabama, Arkansas, Georgia, Louisiana, Mississippi, South Carolina and Virginia. On March 12, it is released to the press.
- February 13 – Wilmington, Delaware school board decides to end segregation.
- February 22 – Ninety black leaders in Montgomery, Alabama are arrested for leading a bus boycott.
- February 29 – Mississippi legislature declares U.S. Supreme Court integration decision "invalid" in that state.
- March 1 – Alabama legislature votes to ask for federal funds to deport blacks to northern states.
- March 12 – U.S. Supreme Court orders the University of Florida to admit a black law school applicant "without delay".
- March 22 – Martin Luther King Jr. sentenced to fine or jail for instigating Montgomery bus boycott, suspended pending appeal.
- April 11 – Singer Nat King Cole is assaulted during a segregated performance at Municipal Auditorium in Birmingham, Alabama.
- April 23 – U.S. Supreme Court strikes down segregation on buses nationwide.
- May 26 – Circuit Judge Walter B. Jones issues an injunction prohibiting the NAACP from operating in Alabama.
- May 28 – The Tallahassee, Florida bus boycott begins.
- June 5 – The Alabama Christian Movement for Human Rights (ACMHR) is founded at a mass meeting in Birmingham, Alabama.
- September 2–11 – Teargas and National Guard used to quell segregationists rioting in Clinton, TN; 12 black students enter high school under Guard protection. Smaller disturbances occur in Mansfield, TX and Sturgis, KY.
- September 10 – Two black students are prevented by a mob from entering a junior college in Texarkana, Texas. Schools in Louisville, KY are successfully desegregated.
- September 12 – Four black children enter an elementary school in Clay, KY under National Guard protection; white students boycott. The school board bars the 4 again on September 17.
- October 15 – Integrated athletic or social events are banned in Louisiana.
- November 5 – Nat King Cole hosts the first show of The Nat King Cole Show. The show went off the air after only 13 months because no national sponsor could be found.
- November 13 – In Browder v. Gayle, the U.S. Supreme Court strikes down Alabama laws requiring segregation of buses. This ruling, together with the ICC's 1955 ruling in Sarah Keys v. Carolina Coach banning "Jim Crow laws" in bus travel among the states, is a landmark in outlawing "Jim Crow" in bus travel.
- December 20 – Federal marshals enforce the ruling to desegregate bus systems in Montgomery.
- December 24 – Blacks in Tallahassee, Florida begin defying segregation on city buses.
- December 25 – The parsonage in Birmingham, Alabama occupied by Fred Shuttlesworth, movement leader, is bombed. Shuttlesworth receives only minor scrapes.
- December 26 – The ACMHR tests the Browder v. Gayle ruling by riding in the white sections of Birmingham city buses. 22 demonstrators are arrested.
- Mississippi State Sovereignty Commission formed.
- Director J. Edgar Hoover orders the FBI to begin the COINTELPRO program to investigate and disrupt "dissident" groups within the United States.

1957

- February 8 – Georgia Senate votes to declare the Fourteenth and Fifteenth Amendments to the United States Constitution null and void in that state.
- February 14 – Southern Christian Leadership Conference is formed; Dr. Martin Luther King Jr. is named its chairman.
- April 18 – Florida Senate votes to consider U.S. Supreme Court's desegregation decisions "null and void".
- May 17 – The Prayer Pilgrimage for Freedom in Washington, DC is at the time the largest nonviolent demonstration for civil rights, and features Dr. King's "Give Us The Ballot" speech.
- September 2 – Orval Faubus, governor of Arkansas, calls out the National Guard to block integration of Little Rock Central High School.
- September 6 – Federal judge orders Nashville public schools to integrate immediately.
- September 15 – New York Times reports that in three years since the decision, there has been minimal progress toward integration in four southern states, and no progress at all in seven.
- September 24 – President Dwight Eisenhower federalizes the National Guard and also orders US Army troops to ensure Little Rock Central High School in Arkansas is integrated. Federal and National Guard troops escort the Little Rock Nine.
- September 27 – Civil Rights Act of 1957 signed by President Eisenhower.
- October 7 – The finance minister of Ghana is refused service at a Dover, Delaware restaurant. President Eisenhower hosts him at the White House to apologize October 10.
- October 9 – Florida legislature votes to close any school if federal troops are sent to enforce integration.
- October 31 – Officers of NAACP arrested in Little Rock for failing to comply with a new financial disclosure ordinance.
- November 26 – Texas legislature votes to close any school where federal troops might be sent.

1958

- January 18 – Willie O'Ree breaks the color barrier in the National Hockey League, in his first game playing for the Boston Bruins.
- June 29 – Bethel Baptist Church (Birmingham, Alabama) is bombed by Ku Klux Klan members, killing four girls.
- June 30 – In NAACP v. Alabama, the U.S. Supreme Court rules that the NAACP was not required to release membership lists to continue operating in the state.
- July – NAACP Youth Council sponsored sit-ins at the lunch counter of a Dockum Drug Store in downtown Wichita, Kansas. After three weeks, the movement successfully got the store to change its policy of segregated seating, and soon afterward all Dockum stores in Kansas were desegregated.
- August 19 – Clara Luper and the NAACP Youth Council conduct the largest successful sit-in to date, on drug store lunch-counters in Oklahoma City. This starts a successful six-year campaign by Luper and the council to desegregate businesses and related institutions in Oklahoma City.
- August – Jimmy Wilson sentenced to death in Alabama for stealing $1.95; Secretary of State John Foster Dulles asks Governor Jim Folsom to commute his sentence because of international criticism.
- September 2 – Governor J. Lindsay Almond of Virginia threatens to shut down any school if it is forced to integrate.
- September 4 – Justice Department sues under Civil Rights Act to force Terrell County, Georgia to register blacks to vote.
- September 8 – A Federal judge orders Louisiana State University to desegregate; 69 African Americans enroll successfully on September 12.
- September 12 – In Cooper v. Aaron the U.S. Supreme Court rules that the states were bound by the Court's decisions. Governor Faubus responds by shutting down all four high schools in Little Rock, and Governor Almond shuts one in Front Royal, Virginia.
- September 18 – Governor Lindsay closes two more schools in Charlottesville, Virginia, and six in Norfolk on September 27.
- September 29 – The U.S. Supreme Court rules that states may not use evasive measures to avoid desegregation.
- October 8 – A Federal judge in Harrisonburg, VA rules that public money may not be used for segregated private schools.
- October 20 – Thirteen blacks arrested for sitting in front of bus in Birmingham.
- November 28 – Federal court throws out Louisiana law against integrated athletic events.
- December 8 – Voter registration officials in Montgomery refuse to cooperate with US Civil Rights Commission investigation.
- Publication of Here I Stand, Paul Robeson's manifesto-autobiography.

1959

- January 9 – One Federal judge throws out segregation on Atlanta, GA buses, while another orders Montgomery registrars to comply with the Civil Rights Commission.
- January 12 – Motown Records is founded by Berry Gordy.
- January 19 – Federal Appeals court overturns Virginia's closure of the schools in Norfolk; they reopen January 28 with 17 black students.
- February 2 – A high school in Arlington, VA desegregates, allowing four black students.
- April 10 – Three schools in Alexandria, Virginia desegregate with a total of nine black students.
- April 18 – King speaks for the integration of schools at a rally of 26,000 at the Lincoln Memorial in Washington, DC.
- April 24 – Mack Charles Parker is lynched three days before his trial.
- November 20 – Alabama passes laws to limit black voter registration.
- A Raisin in the Sun, a play by Lorraine Hansberry, debuts on Broadway. The 1961 film version will star Sidney Poitier.

=== 1960–1969 ===
1960

- February 1 – Four black students sit at the Woolworth's lunch counter in Greensboro, North Carolina, sparking six months of the Greensboro sit-ins.
- February 13 – The Nashville sit-ins begin, although the students of the Nashville Student Movement, trained by activist and nonviolent teacher James Lawson, had been doing preliminary groundwork towards the action for two months. The sit-in ends successfully in May.
- February 17 – Alabama grand jury indicts Dr. King for tax evasion.
- February 19 – Virginia Union University students, called the Richmond 34 stage sit-in at Woolworth's lunch counter in Richmond, Virginia.
- February 22 – The Richmond 34 stage a sit in the Richmond Room at Thalhimer's department store.
- March 3 – Vanderbilt University expels James Lawson for sit-in participation.
- March 4, 1960 – Houston's first sit-in, led by Texas Southern University students, was held at the Weingarten's lunch counter, located at 4110 Almeda in Houston, Texas.
- March 7 – Felton Turner of Houston is beaten and hanged upside-down in a tree, initials KKK carved on his chest.
- March 19 – San Antonio becomes first city to integrate lunch counters.
- March 20 – Florida Governor LeRoy Collins calls lunch counter segregation "unfair and morally wrong".
- April 8 – Weak civil rights bill survives Senate filibuster.
- April 15–17 – The Student Nonviolent Coordinating Committee (SNCC) is formed in Raleigh, North Carolina.
- April 19 – Z. Alexander Looby's home is bombed, with no injuries. Looby, a Nashville civil rights lawyer, was active in the cities ongoing sit-in movement.
- May – Nashville sit-ins end successfully.
- May 6 – Civil Rights Act of 1960 signed by President Dwight D. Eisenhower.
- May 28 – William Robert Ming and Hubert Delaney obtain an acquittal of Dr. King from an all-white jury in Alabama.
- June 24 – King meets Senator John F. Kennedy (JFK).
- June 28 – Bayard Rustin resigns from SCLC after condemnation by Rep. Adam Clayton Powell Jr.
- July 11 – To Kill a Mockingbird published.
- July 31 – Elijah Muhammad calls for an all-black state. Membership in the Nation of Islam estimated at 100,000.
- August – Reverend Wyatt Tee Walker replaces Ella Baker as SCLC's Executive Director.
- October 19 – Dr. King and fifty others arrested at sit-in at Atlanta's Rich's Department Store.
- October 26 – Dr. King's earlier probation revoked; he is transferred to Reidsville State Prison.
- October 28 – After intervention from Robert F. Kennedy (RFK), King is free on bond.
- November 8 – John F. Kennedy defeats Richard Nixon in the 1960 presidential election.
- November 14 – Ruby Bridges becomes the first African-American child to attend an all-white elementary school in the South (William Frantz Elementary School) following court-ordered integration in New Orleans, Louisiana. This event was portrayed by Norman Rockwell in his 1964 painting The Problem We All Live With.
- December 5 – In Boynton v. Virginia, the U.S. Supreme Court holds that racial segregation in bus terminals is illegal because such segregation violates the Interstate Commerce Act. This ruling, in combination with the ICC's 1955 decision in Keys v. Carolina Coach, effectively outlaws segregation on interstate buses and at the terminals servicing such buses.

1961

- January 11 – Rioting over court-ordered admission of first two African Americans (Hamilton E. Holmes and Charlayne Hunter-Gault) at the University of Georgia leads to their suspension, but they are ordered reinstated.
- January 31 – Member of the Congress of Racial Equality (CORE) and nine students were arrested in Rock Hill, South Carolina for a sit-in at a McCrory's lunch counter.
- March 6 – JFK issues Executive Order 10925, which establishes a Presidential committee that later becomes the Equal Employment Opportunity Commission.
- May 4 – The first group of Freedom Riders, with the intent of integrating interstate buses, leaves Washington, D.C. by Greyhound bus. The group, organized by the Congress of Racial Equality (CORE), leaves shortly after the U.S. Supreme Court has outlawed segregation in interstate transportation terminals.
- May 14 – The Freedom Riders' bus is attacked and burned outside of Anniston, Alabama. A mob beats the Freedom Riders upon their arrival in Birmingham. The Freedom Riders are arrested in Jackson, Mississippi, and spend forty to sixty days in Parchman Penitentiary.
- May 17 – the Nashville Student Movement, coordinated by Diane Nash and James Bevel, takes up the Freedom Ride, signaling the increased involvement of SNCC.
- May 20 – Freedom Riders are assaulted in Montgomery, Alabama, at the Greyhound Bus Station.
- May 21 – Dr. King, the Freedom Riders, and congregation of 1,500 at Reverend Ralph Abernathy's First Baptist Church in Montgomery are besieged by mob of segregationists; Attorney General Robert F. Kennedy sends federal marshals to protect them.
- May 29 – Attorney General Robert F. Kennedy, citing the 1955 landmark ICC ruling in Sarah Keys v. Carolina Coach Company and the U.S. Supreme Court's 1960 decision in Boynton v. Virginia, petitions the ICC to enforce desegregation in interstate travel.
- June–August – U.S. Department of Justice initiates talks with civil rights groups and foundations on beginning Voter Education Project.
- July – SCLC begins citizenship classes; Andrew J. Young hired to direct the program. Bob Moses begins voter registration in McComb, Mississippi.
- September – James Forman becomes SNCC's Executive Secretary.
- September 23 – The Interstate Commerce Commission, at Robert F. Kennedy's insistence, issues new rules ending discrimination in interstate travel, effective November 1, 1961, six years after the ICC's own ruling in Sarah Keys v. Carolina Coach Company.
- September 25 – Voter registration activist Herbert Lee killed in McComb, Mississippi.
- November 1 – All interstate buses required to display a certificate that reads: "Seating aboard this vehicle is without regard to race, color, creed, or national origin, by order of the Interstate Commerce Commission."
- November 1 – SNCC workers Charles Sherrod and Cordell Reagon and nine Chatmon Youth Council members test new ICC rules at Trailways bus station in Albany, Georgia.
- November 17 – SNCC workers help encourage and coordinate black activism in Albany, Georgia, culminating in the founding of the Albany Movement as a formal coalition.
- November 22 – Three high school students from Chatmon's Youth Council arrested after using "positive actions" by walking into white sections of the Albany bus station.
- November 22 – Albany State College students Bertha Gober and Blanton Hall arrested after entering the white waiting room of the Albany Trailways station.
- December 10 – Freedom Riders from Atlanta, SNCC leader Charles Jones, and Albany State student Bertha Gober are arrested at Albany Union Railway Terminal, sparking mass demonstrations, with hundreds of protesters arrested over the next five days.
- December 11–15 – Five hundred protesters arrested in Albany, Georgia.
- December 15 – King arrives in Albany, Georgia in response to a call from W. G. Anderson, the leader of the Albany Movement to desegregate public facilities.
- December 16 – Dr. King is arrested at an Albany, Georgia demonstration. He is charged with obstructing the sidewalk and parading without a permit.
- December 18 – Albany truce, including a 60-day postponement of King's trial; King leaves town.
- Whitney Young is appointed executive director of the National Urban League and begins expanding its size and mission.
- Black Like Me written by John Howard Griffin, a white southerner who deliberately tanned and dyed his skin to allow him to directly experience the life of the Negro in the Deep South, is published, displaying the brutality of "Jim Crow" segregation to a national audience.

1962

- January 18–20 – Student protests over sit-in leaders' expulsions at Baton Rouge's Southern University, the nation's largest black school, close it down.
- February – Representatives of SNCC, CORE, and the NAACP form the Council of Federated Organizations (COFO). A grant request to fund COFO voter registration activities is submitted to the Voter Education Project (VEP).
- February 26 – Segregated transportation facilities, both interstate and intrastate, ruled unconstitutional by U.S. Supreme Court.
- March – SNCC workers sit-in at U.S. Attorney General Robert F. Kennedy's office to protest jailings in Baton Rouge.
- March 20 – FBI installs wiretaps on NAACP activist Stanley Levison's office.
- April 3 – Defense Department orders full racial integration of military reserve units, except the National Guard.
- April 9 – Corporal Roman Duckworth shot by a police officer in Taylorsville, Mississippi.
- June – Leroy Willis becomes first black graduate of the University of Virginia College of Arts and Sciences.
- June – SNCC workers establish voter registration projects in rural southwest Georgia.
- July 10 – August 28 SCLC renews protests in Albany; King in jail July 10–12 and July 27 – August 10.
- August 31 – Fannie Lou Hamer attempts to register to vote in Indianola, Mississippi.
- September 9 – Two black churches used by SNCC for voter registration meetings are burned in Sasser, Georgia.
- September 20 – James Meredith is barred from becoming the first black student to enroll at the University of Mississippi.
- September 30-October 1 – U.S. Supreme Court Justice Hugo Black orders James Meredith admitted to Ole Miss.; he enrolls and a riot ensues. French photographer Paul Guihard and Oxford resident Ray Gunter are killed.
- October – Leflore County, Mississippi, supervisors cut off surplus food distribution in retaliation against voter drive.
- October 23 – FBI begins Communist Infiltration (COMINFIL) investigation of SCLC.
- November 7–8 – Edward Brooke selected Massachusetts Attorney General, Leroy Johnson elected Georgia State Senator, Augustus F. Hawkins elected first black from California in Congress.
- November 20 – Attorney General Kennedy authorizes FBI wiretap on Stanley Levison's home telephone.
- November 20 – President Kennedy upholds 1960 presidential campaign promise to eliminate housing segregation by signing Executive Order 11063 banning segregation in Federally funded housing.

1963

- January 18 – Incoming Alabama governor George Wallace calls for "segregation now, segregation tomorrow, segregation forever" in his inaugural address.
- April 3–May 10 – The Birmingham campaign, organized by the Southern Christian Leadership Conference (SCLC) and the Alabama Christian Movement for Human Rights challenges city leaders and business owners in Birmingham, Alabama, with daily mass demonstrations.
- April – Mary Lucille Hamilton, Field Secretary for the Congress of Racial Equality, refuses to answer a judge in Gadsden, Alabama, until she is addressed by the honorific "Miss". It was the custom of the time to address white people by honorifics and people of color by their first names. Hamilton is jailed for contempt of court and refuses to pay bail. The case Hamilton v. Alabama is filed by the NAACP. It was appealed to the U.S. Supreme Court, which ruled in 1964 that courts must address persons of color with the same courtesy extended to whites.
- April 7 – Ministers John Thomas Porter, Nelson H. Smith and A. D. King lead a group of 2,000 marchers to protest the jailing of movement leaders in Birmingham.
- April 12 – Dr. King is arrested in Birmingham for "parading without a permit".
- April 16 – Dr. King's Letter from Birmingham Jail is completed.
- April 23 – CORE activist William L. Moore is murdered in Gadsden, Alabama.
- May 2–4 – Birmingham's juvenile court is inundated with African-American children and teenagers arrested after James Bevel launches his "D-Day" youth march. The actions spans three days to become the Birmingham Children's Crusade.
- May 9–10 – After images of fire hoses and police dogs turned on protesters are televised, the Children's Crusade lays the groundwork for the terms of a negotiated truce on Thursday, May 9 puts an end to mass demonstrations in return for rolling back oppressive segregation laws and practices. Dr. King and Reverend Fred Shuttlesworth announce the settlement terms on Friday, May 10, only after King holds out to orchestrate the release of thousands of jailed demonstrators with bail money from Harry Belafonte and Robert Kennedy.
- May 11–12 – Double bombing in Birmingham, probably conducted by the KKK in cooperation with local police, precipitates rioting, police retaliation, intervention of state troopers, and finally mobilization of federal troops.
- May 13 – In United States of America and Interstate Commerce Commission v. the City of Jackson, Mississippi et al., the United States Court of Appeals Fifth Circuit rules the city's attempt to circumvent laws desegregating interstate transportation facilities by posting sidewalk signs outside Greyhound, Trailways and Illinois Central terminals reading "Waiting Room for White Only — By Order Police Department" and "Waiting Room for Colored Only – By Order Police Department" to be unlawful.
- May 24 – A group of Black leaders (assembled by James Baldwin) meets with Attorney General Robert F. Kennedy to discuss race relations.
- May 29 – Violence escalates at NAACP picket of Philadelphia construction site.
- May 30 – Police attack Florida A&M anti-segregation demonstrators with tear gas; arrest 257.
- June 9 – Fannie Lou Hamer is among several SNCC workers badly beaten by police in the Winona, Mississippi, jail after their bus stops there.
- June 11 – "The Stand in the Schoolhouse Door": Alabama Governor George Wallace stands in front of a schoolhouse door at the University of Alabama in an attempt to stop desegregation by the enrollment of two black students, Vivian Malone and James Hood. Wallace only stands aside after being confronted by federal marshals, Deputy Attorney General Nicholas Katzenbach, and the Alabama National Guard. Later in life he apologizes for his opposition to racial integration then.
- June 11 – President Kennedy makes his historic civil rights address, promising a bill to Congress the next week. About civil rights for "Negroes", in his speech he asks for "the kind of equality of treatment which we would want for ourselves."
- June 12 – NAACP field secretary Medgar Evers is assassinated in Jackson, Mississippi. (His murderer is convicted in 1994.)
- Summer – 80,000 blacks quickly register to vote in Mississippi by a test project to show their desire to participate.
- June 19 – President Kennedy sends Congress (H. Doc. 124, 88th Cong., 1st session) his proposed Civil Rights Act. White leaders in business and philanthropy gather at the Carlyle Hotel to raise initial funds for the Council on United Civil Rights Leadership
- August 28 – Gwynn Oak Amusement Park in Northwest Baltimore, County, Maryland is desegregated.
- August 28 – March on Washington for Jobs and Freedom is held. King gives his I Have a Dream speech.
- September 10 – Birmingham, Alabama City Schools are integrated by National Guardsmen under orders from President Kennedy.
- September 15 – 16th Street Baptist Church bombing in Birmingham kills four young girls. That same day, in response to the killings, James Bevel and Diane Nash begin the Alabama Project, which will later grow into the Selma Voting Rights Movement.
- September 19 - Iota Phi Theta fraternity was founded at Morgan State College (now Morgan State University)
- November 10 – Malcolm X delivers "Message to the Grass Roots" speech, calling for unity against the white power structure and criticizing the March on Washington.
- November 22 – President Kennedy is assassinated. The new president, Lyndon B. Johnson, decides that accomplishing Kennedy's legislative agenda is his best strategy, which he pursues.

1964

- All year – The Alabama Voting Rights Project continues organizing as Bevel, Nash, and James Orange work without the support of SCLC.
- January 23 – Twenty-fourth Amendment abolishes the poll tax for Federal elections.
- Summer – Mississippi Freedom Summer – voter registration in the state. Create the Mississippi Freedom Democratic Party to elect an alternative slate of delegates for the national convention, as blacks are still officially disfranchised.
- April 13 – Sidney Poitier wins the Academy Award for Best Actor for role in Lilies of the Field.
- June 21 – Murders of Chaney, Goodman, and Schwerner, three civil rights workers disappear, later to be found murdered.
- June 28 – Organization of Afro-American Unity is founded by Malcolm X, lasts until his death.
- July 2 – Civil Rights Act of 1964 signed, banning discrimination based on "race, color, religion, sex or national origin" in employment practices and public accommodations.
- August – Congress passes the Economic Opportunity Act which, among other things, provides federal funds for legal representation of Native Americans in both civil and criminal suits. This allows the ACLU and the American Bar Association to represent Native Americans in cases that later win them additional civil rights.
- August – The Mississippi Freedom Democratic Party delegates challenge the seating of all-white Mississippi representatives at the Democratic national convention.
- December 10 – Martin Luther King Jr. is awarded the Nobel Peace Prize, the youngest person so honored.
- December 14 – In Heart of Atlanta Motel v. United States, the U.S. Supreme Court upholds the Civil Rights Act of 1964.

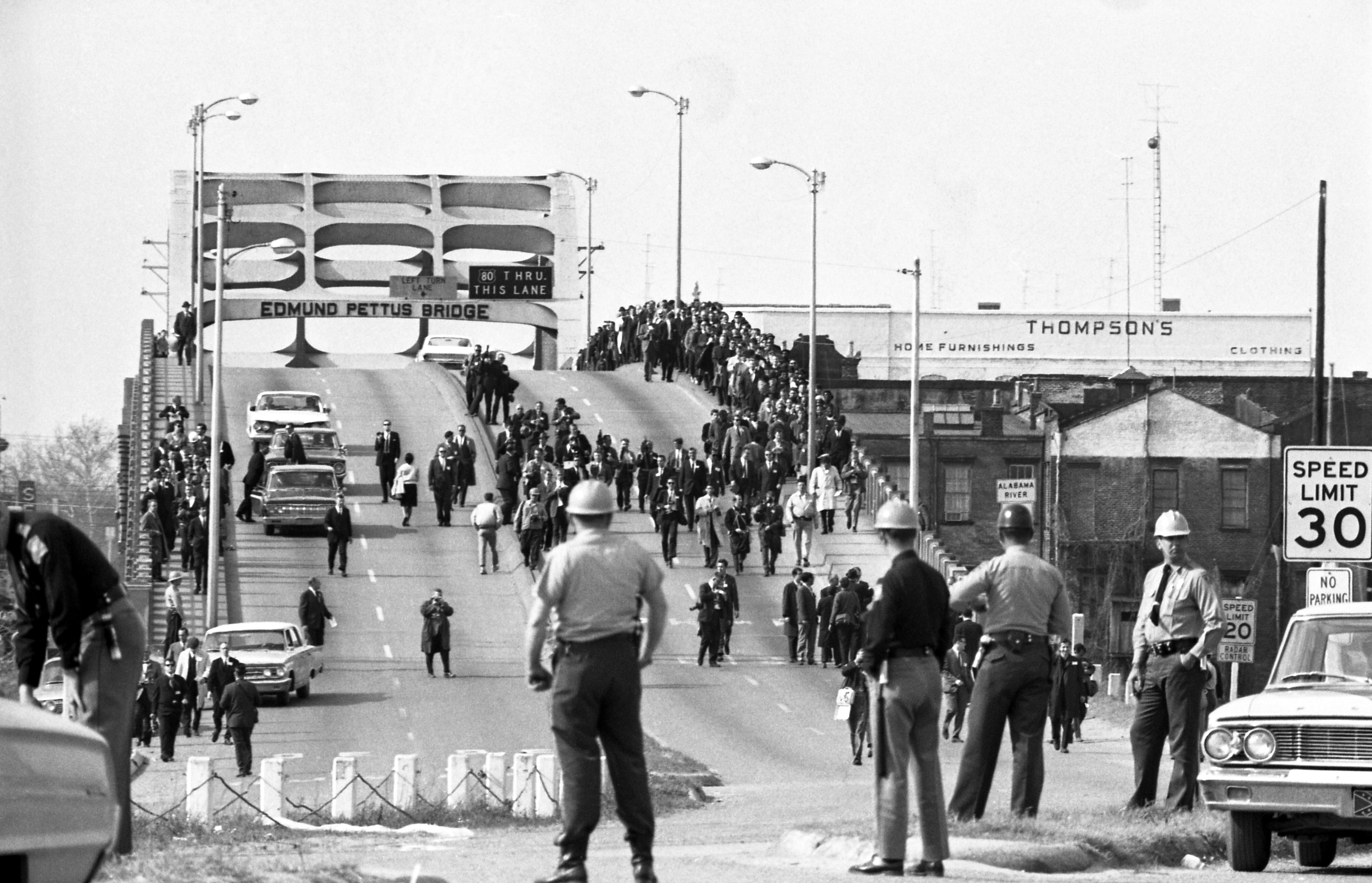
The Edmund Pettus Bridge on "Bloody Sunday" in 1965

1965

- February 18 – A peaceful protest march in Marion, Alabama leads to Jimmie Lee Jackson being shot by Alabama state trooper James Bonard Fowler. Jackson dies on February 26, and Fowler is indicted for his murder in 2007.
- February 21 – Malcolm X is assassinated in Manhattan, New York, probably by three members of the Nation of Islam.
- March 7 – Bloody Sunday: Civil rights workers in Selma, Alabama, begin the Selma to Montgomery march but are forcibly stopped by a massive Alabama State trooper and police blockade as they cross the Edmund Pettus Bridge. Many marchers are injured. This march, initiated and organized by James Bevel, becomes the visual symbol of the Selma Voting Rights Movement.
- March 15 – President Lyndon Johnson uses the phrase "We Shall Overcome" in a speech before Congress on the voting rights bill.
- March 25 – After the completion of the Selma to Montgomery March a white volunteer Viola Liuzzo is shot and killed by Ku Klux Klan members in Alabama, one of whom was an FBI informant.
- June 2 – Black deputy sheriff Oneal Moore is murdered in Varnado, Louisiana.
- July 2 – Equal Employment Opportunity Commission opens.
- August 6 – Voting Rights Act of 1965 was signed by President Johnson. It eliminated literacy tests, poll tax, and other subjective voter tests that were widely responsible for the disfranchisement of African Americans in the Southern States and provided Federal oversight of voter registration in states and individual voting districts where such discriminatory tests were used.
- August 11–15 – Following the accusations of mistreatment and police brutality by the Los Angeles Police Department towards the city's African-American community, Watts riots erupt in South Central Los Angeles which lasted over five days. Over 34 were killed, 1,032 injured, 3,438 arrested, and cost over $40 million in property damage in the Watts riots.
- September – Raylawni Branch and Gwendolyn Elaine Armstrong become the first African-American students to attend the University of Southern Mississippi.
- September 15 – Bill Cosby co-stars in I Spy, becoming the first black person to appear in a starring role on American television.
- September 24 – President Johnson signs Executive Order 11246 requiring Equal Employment Opportunity by federal contractors.

1966

- January 10 – NAACP local chapter president Vernon Dahmer is injured by a bomb in Hattiesburg, Mississippi. He dies the next day.
- June 5 – James Meredith begins a solitary March Against Fear from Memphis, Tennessee to Jackson, Mississippi. Shortly after starting, he is shot with birdshot and injured. Civil rights leaders and organizations rally and continue the march leading to, on June 16, Stokely Carmichael first using the slogan Black power in a speech.
- Summer – The Chicago Open Housing Movement, led by King, Bevel, and Al Raby, includes a large rally, marches, and demands to Mayor Richard J. Daley and the City of Chicago which are discussed in a movement-ending Summit Conference.
- September – Nichelle Nichols is cast as a female black officer on television's Star Trek. She briefly considers leaving the role, but is encouraged by Dr. King to continue as an example for their community.
- October – Black Panther Party founded by Huey P. Newton and Bobby Seale in Oakland, California.
- November – Edward Brooke is elected to the U.S. Senate from Massachusetts. He is the first black senator since 1881.

1967

- January 9 – Julian Bond is seated in the Georgia House of Representatives by order of the U.S. Supreme Court after his election.
- April 4 – King delivers his "Beyond Vietnam" speech, calling for defeat of "the giant triplets of racism, materialism, and militarism".
- June 12 – In Loving v. Virginia, the U.S. Supreme Court rules that prohibiting interracial marriage is unconstitutional.
- June 13 – Thurgood Marshall is the first African American appointed to the U.S. Supreme Court.
- July 23–27 – The Detroit riot erupts in Detroit, Michigan, for five days following a raid by the Detroit Police Department on an unlicensed club which celebrated the returning Vietnam Veteran hosted by mostly African Americans. More than 43 (33 were black and ten white) were killed, 467 injured, 7,231 arrested, and 2,509 stores looted or burned during the riot. It was one of the deadliest and most destructive riots in United States history, lasting five days and surpassing the violence and property destruction of Detroit's 1943 race riot.
- August 2 – The film In the Heat of the Night is released, starring Sidney Poitier.
- November 17 – Philadelphia Student School Board Demonstration, 26 demands peacefully issued by students, but event became a police riot.
- December 11 – The film Guess Who's Coming to Dinner is released, also with Sidney Poitier.
- In the trial of accused killers in the murders of Chaney, Goodman, and Schwerner, the jury convicts 7 of 18 accused men. Conspirator Edgar Ray Killen is later convicted in 2005.
- The film The Great White Hope starring James Earl Jones is released; it is based on the experience of heavyweight Jack Johnson.
- The book Death at an Early Age: The Destruction of the Hearts and Minds of Negro Children in the Boston Public Schools is published.

1968

- February 1 – Two Memphis sanitation workers are killed in the line of duty, exacerbating labor tensions.
- February 8 – The Orangeburg massacre occurs during university protest in South Carolina.
- February 12 – First day of the (wildcat) Memphis sanitation strike
- March – While filming a prime time television special, Petula Clark touches Harry Belafonte's arm during a duet. Chrysler Corporation, the show's sponsor, insists the moment be deleted, but Clark stands firm, destroys all other takes of the song, and delivers the completed program to NBC with the touch intact. The show is broadcast on April 8, 1968.
- April 3 – King returns to Memphis; delivers "Mountaintop" speech.
- April 4 – Assassination of Martin Luther King Jr. in Memphis, Tennessee.
- April 4–8 and one in May 1968 – In response to the killing of Dr. King, over 150 cities experience rioting.
- April 11 – Civil Rights Act of 1968 is signed. The Fair Housing Act is Title VIII of this Civil Rights Act – it bans discrimination in the sale, rental, and financing of housing. The law is passed following a series of contentious open housing campaigns throughout the urban North. The most significant of these campaigns were the Chicago Open Housing Movement of 1966 and organized events in Milwaukee during 1967–68. In both cities, angry white mobs attacked nonviolent protesters.
- May 12 – Poor People's Campaign marches on Washington, DC.
- June 6 – Senator Robert F. Kennedy, a Civil Rights advocate, is assassinated after winning the California presidential primary. His appeal to minorities helped him secure the victory.
- September 17 – Diahann Carroll stars in the title role in Julia, as the first African-American actress to star in her own television series where she did not play a domestic worker.
- October 3 – The play The Great White Hope opens; it runs for 546 performances and later becomes a film.
- October – Tommie Smith and John Carlos raise their fists to symbolize black power and unity after winning the gold and bronze medals, respectively, at the 1968 Summer Olympic Games.
- November 22 – First interracial kiss on American television, between Nichelle Nichols and William Shatner on Star Trek.
- In Powe v. Miles, a federal court holds that the portions of private colleges that are funded by public money are subject to the Civil Rights Act.
- Shirley Chisholm becomes the first African-American woman elected to Congress.

1969

- January 8–18 – Student protesters at Brandeis University take over Ford and Sydeman Halls, demanding creation of an Afro-American Department. This is approved by the University on April 24.
- February 13 – National Guard with teargas and riot sticks crush a pro-black student demonstration at University of Wisconsin.
- February 16 – After 3 days of clashes between police and Duke University students, the school agrees to establish a Black Studies program.
- February 23 – UNC Food Worker Strike begins when workers abandon their positions in Lenoir Hall protesting racial injustice
- April 3–4 – National Guard called into Chicago, and Memphis placed on curfew on anniversary of MLK's assassination.
- April 19 – Armed African-American students protesting discrimination take over Willard Straight Hall, the student union building at Cornell University. They end the seizure the following day after the university accedes to their demands, including an Afro-American studies program.
- April 25–28 – Activist students takeover Merrill House at Colgate University demanding Afro-American studies programs.
- May 8 – City College of New York closed following a two-week-long campus takeover demanding Afro-American and Puerto-Rican studies; riots among students break out when the school tries to reopen.
- June – The second of two US federal appeals court decisions confirms members of the public hold legal standing to participate in broadcast station license hearings, and under the Fairness Doctrine finds the record of segregationist TV station WLBT beyond repair. The FCC is ordered to open proceedings for a new licensee.
- September 1–2 – Race rioting in Hartford, CT and Camden, NJ.
- October 29 – The U.S. Supreme Court in Alexander v. Holmes County Board of Education orders immediate desegregation of public schools, signaling the end of the "all deliberate speed" doctrine established in Brown II.
- December – Fred Hampton, chairman of the Illinois chapter of the Black Panther Party, is shot and killed while asleep in bed during a police raid on his home.
- United Citizens Party is formed in South Carolina when Democratic Party refuses to nominate African-American candidates.
- W. E. B. Du Bois Institute for African and African-American Research founded at Harvard University.
- The Revised Philadelphia Plan is instituted by the Department of Labor.
- The Congressional Black Caucus is formed.

=== 1970–2000 ===
1970

- January 19 – G. Harrold Carswell's nomination to the U.S. Supreme Court is rejected following protests from the NAACP and feminists.
- April 23 – Black Panther Marshall "Eddie" Conway arrested in Baltimore, MD.
- May 27 – The film Watermelon Man is released, directed by Melvin Van Peebles and starring Godfrey Cambridge. The film is a comedy about a bigoted white man who wakes up one morning to discover that his skin pigment has changed to black.
- August 7 – Marin County courthouse incident.
- August 14 – Hoover adds Angela Davis to FBI Most Wanted list.
- October 13 – Angela Davis captured in New York City.
- First blaxploitation films released.

1971

- April 20 – The U.S. Supreme Court, in Swann v. Charlotte-Mecklenburg Board of Education, upholds desegregation busing of students to achieve integration.
- April 27 – FBI officially ends COINTELPRO
- June – Control of segregationist TV station WLBT given to a bi-racial foundation.
- June 4 – Angela Davis acquitted of all charges.
- August 21 – George Jackson shot to death in San Quentin Prison.
- Ernest J. Gaines's Reconstruction-era novel The Autobiography of Miss Jane Pittman is published.

1972

- January 25 – Shirley Chisholm becomes the first major-party African-American candidate for President of the United States and the first woman to run for the Democratic presidential nomination.
- November 16 – In Baton Rouge, two Southern University students are killed by white sheriff deputies during a school protest over lack of funding from the state. The university's Smith-Brown Memorial Union is named as a memorial to them.
- November 16 – The infamous Tuskegee syphilis experiment ends. Begun in 1932, the U.S. Public Health Service's 40-year experiment on 399 black men in the late stages of syphilis has been described as an experiment that "used human beings as laboratory animals in a long and inefficient study of how long it takes syphilis to kill someone."

1973

- May 8 – Nelson Rockefeller signs the Rockefeller Drug Laws for New York state with draconian indeterminate sentences for drug possession, as well as sale.
- July 31 – FBI ends Ghetto Informant Program
- Combahee River Collective, a Black feminist group, is established in Boston, out of New York's National Black Feminist Organization.

1974

- July 25 – In Milliken v. Bradley, the U.S. Supreme Court in a 5–4 decision holds that outlying districts could only be forced into a desegregation busing plan if there was a pattern of violation on their part. This decision reinforces the trend of white flight.
- Salsa Soul Sisters, Third World Wimmin Inc Collective, the first "out" organization for lesbians, womanists and women of color formed in New York City.

1975

- April 30 – In the pilot episode of Starsky and Hutch, Richard Ward plays an African-American supervisor of white American employees for the first time on TV.

1976

- February – Black History Month is founded by Carter Woodson's Association for the Study of Afro-American Life and History.
- The novel Roots: The Saga of an American Family by Alex Haley is published.
- Runyon v. McCrary bars segregation in private schools whereas Brown (1954; Brown III from 1978) only applies to public schools

1977

- Combahee River Collective, a Black feminist group, publishes the Combahee River Collective Statement.
- President Jimmy Carter appoints Andrew Young to serve as Ambassador to the United Nations, the first African American to serve in the position.

1978

- June 28 – Regents of the University of California v. Bakke bars racial quota systems in college admissions but affirms the constitutionality of affirmative action programs giving equal access to minorities.

1979

- United Steelworkers of America v. Weber is a case regarding affirmative action in which the U.S. Supreme Court holds that the Civil Rights Act of 1964 did not bar employers from favoring women and minorities.
- November 2 – Assata Shakur escapes from prison.

1981

- December 9 – Mumia Abu-Jamal arrested.

1982

- Charles Fuller writes A Soldier's Play, which is later made into the film A Soldier's Story.
- November 30 – Michael Jackson releases Thriller, which becomes the best-selling album of all time.

1983

- May 24 – The U.S. Supreme Court rules that Bob Jones University did not qualify as either a tax-exempt or a charitable organization due to its racially discriminatory practices.
- August 30 – Guion Bluford becomes the first African-American to go into space.
- November 2 – President Ronald Reagan signs a bill creating a federal holiday to honor Martin Luther King Jr., fifteen years after his death.
- Alice Walker receives the Pulitzer Prize for her novel The Color Purple.

1984

- September 13 – The film A Soldier's Story is released, dealing with racism in the U.S. military.
- The Cosby Show begins, and is regarded as one of the defining television shows of the decade.
- First contract for complete privatization of a prison is awarded to Corrections Corporation of America, beginning a new era of racially disproportionate mass incarceration.

1985

- May 13 – Bombing of MOVE house in Philadelphia

1986

- January 20 – Established by legislation in 1983, Martin Luther King Jr. Day is first celebrated as a national holiday.
- October 27 – Anti-Drug Abuse Act of 1986 establishes 100:1 sentencing disparity between crack and powder cocaine

1987

- The Public Broadcasting Service's six-part documentary Eyes on the Prize is first shown, covering the years 1954–1965. In 1990 it is added to by the eight-part Eyes on the Prize II covering the years 1965–1985.
- Benjamin Carson became the first person in history to separate conjoined twins that were joined at the head.

1988

- Civil Rights Restoration Act of 1988.
- December 9 – The film Mississippi Burning is released, regarding the 1964 murders of Chaney, Goodman, and Schwerner.

1989

- February 10 – Ron Brown is elected chairman of the Democratic National Committee, becoming the first African American to lead a major United States political party.
- October 1 – Colin Powell becomes Chairman of the Joint Chiefs of Staff.
- December 15 – The film Glory is released: it features African-American Civil War soldiers.

1990

- January 13 – Douglas Wilder becomes the first elected African-American governor as he takes office in Richmond, Virginia.

1991

- March 3 – Four white police officers are videotaped beating African-American Rodney King in Los Angeles.
- October 15 – Senate confirms the nomination of Clarence Thomas to the U.S. Supreme Court.
- November 21 – Civil Rights Act of 1991 enacted.
- Henry Louis Gates Jr. becomes Harvard University's Director of the W. E. B. Du Bois Institute for African and African American Research.

1992

- April 29 – The 1992 Los Angeles riots erupt after the officers accused of beating Rodney King are acquitted.
- September 12 – Mae Carol Jemison becomes the first African-American woman to travel in space when she goes into orbit aboard the Space Shuttle Endeavour.
- November 3 – Carol Moseley Braun becomes the first African-American woman to be elected to the United States Senate.
- November 18 – Director Spike Lee's film Malcolm X is released.

1994

- March 29 – Cornel West's text Race Matters is published.

1995

- June 30 – In Miller v. Johnson the U.S. Supreme Court rules that gerrymandering based on race is unconstitutional.
- October 16 – Million Man March in Washington, D.C., co-initiated by Louis Farrakhan and James Bevel.

1997

- 16 May – President Bill Clinton apologizes to victims of the Tuskegee syphilis experiment
- July 9 – Director Spike Lee releases his documentary 4 Little Girls, about the 1963 16th Street Baptist Church bombing.
- October 25 – Million Woman March in Philadelphia.

1998

- June 7 – James Byrd Jr. is brutally murdered by white supremacists in Jasper, Texas. The scene is reminiscent of earlier lynchings. In response, Byrd's family create the James Byrd Foundation for Racial Healing.
- October 23 – The film American History X is released, powerfully highlighting the problems of urban racism.

1999

- Franklin Raines becomes the first black CEO of a fortune 500 company.
- February 4 – Amadou Diallo shooting by New York Police (precursor to Daniels, et al. v. the City of New York)

2000

- May 3 – Bob Jones University, a fundamentalist South Carolina private institution, ends its ban on interracial dating.

== 21st century ==
=== 2001–2010 ===
2001

- January 20 – Colin Powell becomes Secretary of State.

2002

- Cynthia McKinney introduces a proposed Martin Luther King Jr. Records Collection Act.

2003

- June 23 – The U.S. Supreme Court in Grutter v. Bollinger upholds the University of Michigan Law School's admission policy. However, in the simultaneously heard Gratz v. Bollinger the university is required to change a policy.

2005

- June 21 – Edgar Ray Killen is convicted of participating in the murders of Chaney, Goodman, and Schwerner.
- October 15 – The Millions More Movement holds a march in Washington D.C.
- October 24 – Rosa Parks dies at age 92. Her solitary action spearheaded the Montgomery bus boycott in 1955. Her body lies in state in the Capitol Rotunda in Washington, D.C. before interment.

2006

- March 26 – Capitol Hill police fail to recognize Cynthia McKinney as a member of Congress.

2007

- May 10 – Alabama state trooper James Bonard Fowler is indicted for the murder of Jimmie Lee Jackson on February 18, 1965.
- June 28 – Parents Involved in Community Schools v. Seattle School District No. 1 decided along with Meredith v. Jefferson County Board of Education prohibits assigning students to public schools solely for the purpose of achieving racial integration and declines to recognize racial balancing as a compelling state interest.
- December 10 – U.S. Supreme Court rules 7–2 in Kimbrough v. United States that judges may deviate from federal sentencing guidelines for crack cocaine.

2008

- June 3 – Barack Obama receives enough delegates by the end of state primaries to be the presumptive Democratic Party of the United States nominee.
- July 12 – Cynthia McKinney accepts the Green Party nomination in the Presidential race.
- July 30 – United States Congress apologizes for slavery and "Jim Crow".
- August 28 – At the 2008 Democratic National Convention, in a stadium filled with supporters, Barack Obama accepts the Democratic nomination for President of the United States.
- November 4 – Barack Obama elected 44th President of the United States of America, opening his victory speech with, "If there is anyone out there who still doubts that America is a place where all things are possible; who still wonders if the dream of our founders is alive in our time; who still questions the power of our democracy, tonight is your answer."

2009

- January 20 – Barack Obama sworn in and offered Sherrod a new position as the 44th President of the United States, the first African-American to become president.
- January 30 – Former Maryland Lt. Governor Michael Steele becomes the first African-American Chairman of the Republican National Committee.
- The U.S. Postal Service issues a commemorative six-stamp set portraying twelve civil rights pioneers.
- October 6 – Judge Keith Bardwell refuses to officiate an interracial marriage in Louisiana.
- October 9 – Barack Obama is awarded the Nobel Peace Prize.

2010

- March 14 – Disney officially crowns its first African-American Disney Princess, Tiana.
- July 19 – Shirley Sherrod first is pressured to resign from the U.S. Department of Agriculture and immediately thereafter receives its apology after she is inaccurately accused of being racist towards white Americans.
- August 3 – Fair Sentencing Act reducing sentencing disparity between crack and powder cocaine to an 18:1 ratio.

=== 2011–2020 ===
2011

- January 14 – Michael Steele, the first African-American Chairman of the RNC lost his bid for re-election.
- August 22 – The Martin Luther King Jr. Memorial on the National Mall in Washington, D.C. opens to the public, and is officially dedicated on October 16.
- November 19 – Killing of Kenneth Chamberlain, Sr.

2012

- February 26 – Killing of Trayvon Martin by George Zimmerman in Sanford, Florida.

2013

- January 20 – Barack Obama is sworn in for his second term as president.
- March 9 – New York police officers shoot 16-year-old Kimani Gray, triggering weeks of protests in Brooklyn
- May 9 – Malcolm Shabazz killed in Mexico.
- May 2 – FBI promotes Assata Shakur to list of "most wanted terrorists".
- June 24 – State of Florida v. George Zimmerman begins.
- June 25 – The U.S. Supreme Court overturns part of the 1965 Voting Rights Act in Shelby County v. Holder.
- July 13 – George Zimmerman acquitted, provoking nationwide protests. The Black Lives Matter movement is created by Alicia Garza, Patrisse Cullors, and Opal Tometi, in response to the ongoing racial profiling of and police brutality against young black men.

2014

- August 9 – Shooting of Michael Brown by Police Officer Darren Wilson in Ferguson, Missouri is followed by demonstrations and protests which include the term "Hands up, don't shoot". Demonstrations focused on the incident, using the "Hands up" expression, are held across the U.S. and overseas.
- July 17 – Eric Garner died in Staten Island, New York City, after a police officer put him in a chokehold for 15 seconds.

2015

- June 17 – Nine African Americans are killed in the Charleston Church Shooting at Emanuel African Methodist Episcopal Church in downtown Charleston, S.C.
- July 13 – Sandra Bland dies in jail, days after being pulled over for a traffic stop in Texas.
- In the U.S. Supreme Court case Texas Dept. of Housing and Community Affairs v. Inclusive Communities Project, Inc., 576 U.S. ___ (2015), the Court held that Congress specifically intended to include disparate impact claims in the Fair Housing Act, but that such claims require a plaintiff to prove it is the defendant's policies that cause a disparity. The Fair Housing Act prohibits discrimination based on race.
- November 1 – Michael Bruce Curry becomes the first African-American Presiding Bishop of the Episcopal Church (United States), having been elected by an overwhelming margin on the first ballot of the 78th General Convention the preceding June.

2016

- September 14, 2016 – The National Museum of African American History opens its doors for the first time, becoming the 19th museum of the Smithsonian Institution.

2020

- March 13 – Shooting of Breonna Taylor
- May 25 – The murder of George Floyd leads to a cascade of protests with mottos such as "I can't breathe" and "Defund the police", and the mass of removals of Confederate monuments and renaming of slave-trade memorials around the world.
- May 25 – Central Park birdwatching incident, followed by Black Birders Week
- June 12 – Killing of Rayshard Brooks
- August 19 - First African-American to be nominated as a major party U.S. vice-presidential candidate: Kamala Harris, Democratic Party (See also: 2021)
- August 23 – Shooting of Jacob Blake
- November 7 - First African-American elected Vice President of the United States: Kamala Harris

=== 2021–2022 ===
2021

- January 20 – Kamala Harris sworn in as 49th Vice President of the United States, the first African-American and first Asian-American vice president as well as the first woman vice president.
- April 11 – The Killing of Daunte Wright

2022

- A 2022 Buffalo shooting occurs killing 10, with the shooter live streaming the attack on Twitch. The majority of victims are African American, with the shooter driving over 200 km to reach the supermarket in which it occurred in.

== See also ==
- African American history
- Baseball color line
- Big Six (activists)
- Birmingham Civil Rights District
- Birmingham Civil Rights Institute
- Black pride
- Black school
- Black suffrage
- Civil rights movement (1896–1954)
- Driving While Black
- Freedom Schools
- Hate crime laws in the United States
- History of slavery in the United States
- Human rights in the United States
- List of African-American firsts
- List of African-American U.S. state firsts
- List of African-American United States Cabinet members
- Mass racial violence in the United States
- Race and sports
- Racial segregation in the United States
- Racism in the United States
- Timeline of the civil rights movement
- Voting rights in the United States
- Wednesdays in Mississippi
