= Association of Southern Women for the Prevention of Lynching =

Women's civil rights organization in the United States

The Association of Southern Women for the Prevention of Lynching (ASWPL) was a women's organization founded by Jessie Daniel Ames in Atlanta, Georgia in November 1930, to lobby and campaign against the lynching of African Americans. The group was made up of middle and upper-class white women. While active, the group had "a presence in every county in the South" of the United States. It was loosely organized and only accepted white women as members because they "believed that only white women could influence other white women." Many of the women involved were also members of missionary societies. Along with the Commission on Interracial Cooperation (CIC), the ASWPL had an important effect on popular opinion among whites relating to lynching.

== History ==
Nine-tenths of all lynchings during the 1890s to the 1940s in the United States occurred in the South. Lynching had been declining, but in 1930, there was a sudden rise in lynchings. In 1930, there were 21 reported lynchings, and 20 of the victims were African Americans. On November 1, 1930, twenty-six "prominent Southern women" assembled in Atlanta in order to discuss the problems of the increase in lynchings, causes, and possible ways women could help eradicate the problem.

One of the many excuses used to conduct lynchings was that it was done in the name of "protecting" white women. ASWPL founder Jessie Daniel Ames pointed out that the alleged rapes of white women by black men, "the supposed rationale for a lynching, seldom occurred and that the true motive for lynching was in racial hatred." In addition, Ames felt that white women were exploited in this narrative "in order to obscure the economic greed and sexual transgressions of white men."

In her writing and speaking for the group, Ames used language taken from evangelical missionary societies and based the issue-oriented focus of the group on secular organizations such as the League of Women Voters.

On that day in November, about twelve women signed a public statement against lynching. Over time, the same statement would have more than 40,000 signatures from Southern women. A core group was formed with twelve women agreeing to hold local meetings against lynching in their home states. Women from Texas, Louisiana, Oklahoma and Arkansas met with Ames in Dallas a few days later in a "conference similar to that held in Atlanta." The group's declaration was:

"Lynching is an indefensible crime. Women dare no longer allow themselves to be the cloak behind which those bent upon personal revenge and savagery commit acts of violence and lawlessness in the name of women. We repudiate this disgraceful claim for all time."

Ames established her own state-level ASWPL chapter in Georgia in January 1931. By April, there were groups formed in all the southern states, except Florida, who created an organization later. In 1934, there was an annual meeting where the ASWPL adopted a formal resolution which stated:

"We declare as our deliberate conclusion that the crime of lynching is a logical result in every community that pursues the policy of humiliation and degradation of a part of its citizenship because of accident of birth; that exploits and intimidates the weaker element ... for economic gain; that refuses equal educational opportunity to one portion of its children; that segregates arbitrarily a whole race ... and finally that denies a voice in the control of government to any fit and proper citizen because of race."

By the early 1940s, there were 109 affiliated associations, with a combined membership of 4 million. Funding for the ASWPL came from the CIC. In May 1940, the ASWPL celebrated 12 months without a lynching. The year before, there had been only three.

In 1940 members of the ASWPL opposed an anti-lynching bill that was up for review at Congress. Ames was a strong state's rights advocate and felt that anti-lynching efforts were better handled at the state level. Instead of the bill, they urged support of continued education, cooperation of both law enforcement and media to prevent lynchings and increased membership.

In 1942, judging that the purposes of the ASWPL had been achieved, Ames wound the association up.

In 1979, Jacquelyn Dowd Hall, the director of the Southern Oral History Program at the University of North Carolina at Chapel Hill, wrote a book, Revolt Against Chivalry, about the activism of Ames and the work of the ASWPL.

== Strategy ==
The ASWPL used the "moral and social leverage of women in their local communities to create a 'new climate of opinion,'" and accomplished this by networking with these women in order to grow the movement. They also educated Southern women about the myth of lynching, which held that lynchings only occurred as "retribution for an attack on a white woman, especially rape." The ASWPL provided facts and figures to back up their claims. Their own position as a "cultural symbol of the southern lady" gave them added "authority" to destroy the myths.

The ASWPL members spoke to men involved in law enforcement in their own communities and asked them to protect African Americans from being lynched. One leader in the ASWPL recalled that, "We were determined not be just another body of resolution-passer. So we went to work where it meant the most: on the county sheriffs." In 1934, Sallie L. Hanna, who led the ASWPL in Texas, "secured the pledges of seven gubernatorial candidates to use the power of the governor's office to end lynching." The winner, James V. Allred, was one of the men who had pledged to end lynching in Texas. In 1938, forty known attempts at lynching were prevented by police officers and sheriffs, "many of them pledged in writing to support" the ASWPL's program.

In addition to speaking with law enforcement, the women of ASWPL talked to church groups all over the South about lynchings. They also created a network of women who were able to find out about lynchings before they happened and report the possible attacks to law enforcement, or even, in some cases, "go themselves to stop the lynchings." Later, the ASWPL sought ways to work with local newspapers to publicize potential lynchings so that those involved could not keep their activities secret.

The ASWPL also demanded "thorough investigation" of any mob killings of African Americans. The investigations marked a change because before the ASWPL was watching, "lynchings were 'hushed up' and therefore soon forgotten."
