= Jessie Daniel Ames =

American civil rights activist

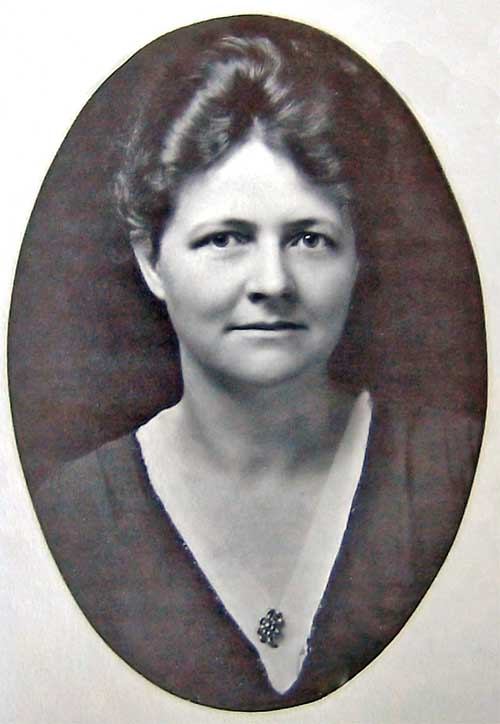
- Born: November 2, 1883; Palestine, Texas, U.S.
- Died: February 21, 1972 (aged 88); Austin, Texas, U.S.
- Burial place: I.O.O.F. Cemetery, Georgetown, Texas
- Education: Southwestern University
- Occupations: Suffragist and Civil Rights Activist
- Known for: Founder of Association of Southern Women for the Prevention of Lynching

Jessie Daniel Ames (November 2, 1883 – February 21, 1972) was a suffragist and civil rights leader from Texas who helped create the anti-lynching movement in the American South. She was one of the first Southern white women to speak out and work publicly against lynching of African Americans, murders which white men claimed to commit in an effort to protect women's "virtue." Despite risks to her personal safety, Ames stood up to these men and led organized efforts by white women to protest lynchings. She gained 40,000 signatures of Southern white women to oppose lynching, helping change attitudes and bring about a decline in these murders in the 1930s and 1940s.

== Biography ==
Ames was born Jessie Harriet Daniel in Palestine, Texas, on November 2, 1883. Her mother was Laura Maria Leonard and her father was James Malcolm Daniel. In 1893, the family moved to Georgetown, Texas. Ames was admitted to the Ladies Annex of Southwestern University at the age of 13 and graduated with a Bachelor of Arts degree in 1902. After graduation, she moved with her family to Laredo, Texas. Ames followed her mother and sister and converted to Methodism despite her father's objection as a nonbeliever. She had joined them in church activities from an early age.

In 1905, Ames married Roger Post Ames, a surgeon in the United States Army, who had worked with Walter Reed in Cuba to prove that mosquitoes caused malaria. During much of their unhappy marriage, Roger Ames lived in Central America where he worked as a physician to the American Consul and the United Fruit Company. Roger Ames died in 1914 in Guatemala from blackwater fever.

Ames had a son and two daughters, the last of whom was born in 1914 after her husband's death. After the death of her father in 1911, Ames helped her mother run the family's telephone company in Georgetown. She also became involved with several Methodist women's groups. This led to her initial participation in the women's suffrage movement.

== Suffrage movement and League of Women Voters ==
In 1916, Ames organized the Georgetown Equal Suffrage League and became its first president. She also wrote a weekly suffrage article in the Williamson County Sun newspaper called "Woman Suffrage Notes." Ames became a protégé of Minnie Fisher Cunningham, the president of the Texas Equal Suffrage Association (TESA). In 1918, Ames was elected treasurer of the TESA.

Texas became the first Southern state to ratify the Nineteenth Amendment in June 1919. In October 1919, Ames founded the Texas League of Women Voters and served as its first president until 1923. In 1923, she represented the national League of Women Voters at the Pan American Congress. She also served as a delegate to the Democratic National Conventions of 1920, 1924, and 1928. Ames served in several other organizations including the Texas branch of the American Association of University Women, Texas Committee on Prisons and Prison Labor, and the Texas Federation of Women's Clubs. She was an officer of the Joint Legislative Council in Texas, also known as the Petticoat Lobby, and was on the Board of Education of the Women's Division of the Methodist Church. In 1924, Ames became the director of the Texas Commission on Interracial Cooperation (CIC) based in Atlanta. In 1929, she moved to Atlanta to become the national director of the CIC Woman's Committee.

== Crockett State School ==
The project to create a home and training school for delinquent African American girls was one of the few instances of interracial cooperation among Texas women. Between 1916 and 1945, the Texas Federation of Colored Women's Clubs (TACWC) campaigned for the creation of the institution and offered to donate the land.

In 1923, the Texas Federation of Women's Clubs and the Joint Legislative Council, both white women's organizations, endorsed the concept. That year, the TACWC raised $2,000 for the down payment on a home. The organization bought land in San Antonio and was able to offer $5,500 as a downpayment.

In 1926, Ames toured the state speaking on behalf of the project to white women's organizations. The Texas legislature passed a bill in 1927 creating the home and school for delinquent black girls but made no appropriations.

It took 18 years before the Texas legislature approved funding. In 1945, the legislature appropriated $60,000 to establish the Brady State School for Negro Girls located in a former prisoner of war camp near Brady, Texas. In 1950, the school relocated to Crockett, Texas, and was renamed the Crockett State School for Girls.

== Association of Southern Women for the Prevention of Lynching ==
In 1930, Ames, with the CIC's financial help, founded the Association of Southern Women for the Prevention of Lynching (ASWPL) with headquarters in Atlanta. The organization excluded African American women and appealed directly to white Southern women to stop lynching. The ASWPL secured the signatures of 40,000 Southern women on its 'Pledge Against Lynching' (see below). Despite encountering hostile opposition and threats of violence, the women conducted petition drives, lobbying and fundraising across the South to work against lynching. By 1940, more than 100 women's organizations had joined the movement against lynching.

Pledge:

We declare lynching is an indefensible crime, destructive of all principles of government, hateful and hostile to every ideal of religion and humanity, debasing and degrading to every person involved...[P]ublic opinion has accepted too easily the claim of lynchers and mobsters that they are acting solely in defense of womanhood. In light of the facts we dare no longer to permit this claim to pass unchallenged, nor allow those bent upon personal revenge and savagery to commit acts of violence and lawlessness in the name of women. We solemnly pledge ourselves to create a new public opinion in the South, which will not condone, for any reason whatever, acts of mobs or lynchers. We will teach our children at home, at school and at church a new interpretation of law and religion; we will assist all officials to uphold their oath of office; and finally, we will join with every minister, editor, school teacher and patriotic citizen in a program of education to eradicate lynchings and mobs forever from our land.

Ames opposed a federal anti-lynching law and advocated instead for individual state laws outlawing lynching. Senators from the South filibustered the proposed federal Dyer Anti-Lynching Bill, which was advocated by an African American women's group called the Anti-Lynching Crusaders. The National Association for the Advancement of Colored People (NAACP) had created the Anti-Lynching Crusaders in 1922 to mobilize support for the Dyer Bill. White Democrats from the Solid South commanded powerful congressional positions due to the disenfranchisement of African Americans across the South. Senator Tom Connally of Texas used a letter written to him from Ames to show widespread Southern opposition to the federal bill. Ames intended the letter to be private in order to allow her to speak out in opposition to lynching when the bill failed.

Ames served as the director of the ASWPL until 1942. By February 1937, 81 state, regional and national organizations had endorsed the anti-lynching platform of the ASWPL. That year, the CIC was replaced by the Southern Regional Council. The number of lynchings decreased as the Great Depression came to an end, although notable lynchings took place in the postwar era, including of black men in uniform.

== Death and legacy ==
Ames retired to Tryon, North Carolina, before returning to Texas in 1968 to live with her younger daughter. Jessie Daniel Ames died of pneumonia on February 21, 1972, in Austin, Texas. She is buried in the family plot in the I.O.O.F. Cemetery in Georgetown, Texas.

In 1985, the Jessie Daniel Ames Lecture Series began at Southwestern University. Her career as an activist for suffrage and against lynching was the subject of the Freshman Symposium at Southwestern University in 1985 and the Brown Symposium at the university in 1986. In December 2025, the Georgetown Independent School District Board of Trustees voted to name the district's 12th elementary school Jessie Daniel Ames Elementary in honor of Ms. Ames. The campus is scheduled to open in the 2026–2027 school year.

== Sources ==
- Brown, Dorothy. “Sixty Five Going on Fifty: A History of the League of Women Voters of Texas, 1903-1969.” Manuscript. League of Women Voters files, Austin, 1969. Accessed on www.my.lwv.org/texas/history 4.13.2019.
- Bowman, John S. The Cambridge Dictionary of American Biography. New York: Cambridge University Press, 1995. P. 15.
- Davis, Angela Y. Women, Race & Class. New York: Vintage Books, 1983. Pp. 194–195.
- Georgetown ISD. "Georgetown ISD Names Its 12th Elementary Campus: Jessie Daniel Ames Elementary School". Retrieved 2025-12-18. Accessed at: https://www.georgetownisdnews.org/news/georgetown-isd-names-its-12th-elementary-campus-jessie-daniel-ames-elementary-school.
- Hall, Jacquelyn Dowd. "Live Through Time: Second Thoughts on Jessie Daniel Ames", pp. 140–158 in The Challenge of Feminist Biography: Writing the Lives of Modern American Women, Sara Alpern, Joyce Antler, Elizabeth Perry Israels, and Ingrid Winther Scobie, eds. Urbana, IL: University of Illinois Press, 1992.
- Hall, Jacquelyn Dowd. Revolt Against Chivalry. New York: Columbia University Press, 1993.
- "Lynching in America: Targeting Black Veterans." Equal Justice Initiative. Retrieved 2019-09-23. Accessed at https://eji.org/reports/online/lynching-in-america-targeting-black-veterans.
- Reid, Daniel G. et al. Dictionary of Christianity in America. Westmont, Illinois: InterVarsity Press, 1990. ISBN 0-8308-1776-X.
- Swartz, Jon D. “Jessie Harriet Daniel Ames” in Jessica Brannon-Wranosky, ed. Texas Women and the Vote. Austin: Texas State Historical Association, 2019, pp. 13–14.
- “Texas Association of Women’s Clubs.” Texas Woman’s University: Woman’s Collection. www.twudigital.contentdm.oclc.org/cdm/landingpage/collection/p16283coll10. Accessed April 19, 2019.
- Winegarten, Ruthe. Black Texas Women: 150 Years of Trial and Triumph. Austin: University of Texas Press, 1995.
