= UNC Food Worker Strike =

Labor strike in 1969

- Part of Labor Unions
- UNC Food Workers Protest SAGA
- Date: February 23-December 9, 1969 (56 years ago)
- Location: United States
- Goals: $1.80/hr campus minimum wage
- Result: Statewide minimum wage increase to $1.80/hr Campus unionbusting, employees fired

Number
~140 to 250 Workers	

The UNC Food Workers Strike was a labor strike at the University of North Carolina at Chapel Hill that began on February 23 and lasted until December 9, 1969. Through the leadership of Mary Smith and Elizabeth Brooks and with the support of student groups and civil rights activists, the strike was organized around a list of demands to improve the working conditions of black food workers. The protesting employees of Lenoir Hall presented this list to University Chancellor J. Carlyle Sitterson, who responded by asserting his commitment "to be[ing] responsive to the educational needs of . . . all races, colors, and creeds" but also his inability to treat any group with preference and to make significant changes on their behalf. He directed a police response to campus disruptions with North Carolina Governor Robert W. Scott, further instigating the protesters and drawing widespread attention to the issue. The subsequent formation of the UNC Non-Academic Employees Union prompted Governor Scott to negotiate with and ultimately accept the terms of the protesters on March 21, 1969. UNC facility employees experienced an increase in wage and working conditions, and this lasted until food management transferred from internal to contractual service provided by SAGA Food Service less than a month later. The change in employers sparked workers, many of whom participated in the first strike, to voice their discontent once again. Employees and students responded immediately, with the strike resuming, among other forms of protest, until its conclusion on December 9, 1969, when black supporters threatened to descend on the campus to elevate the issue if union negotiations did not begin.

Instigated by perceived oppressive employment conditions and fueled by the spirit of the ongoing Civil Rights Movement, the Food Workers Strike brought attention to many issues in Chapel Hill and the American South as well as on college campuses throughout the country. These included the stalling status of desegregation, the assimilation of the fight for civil equality into part of the 1960s Counterculture Movement and the New Left, the shift towards more confrontational forms of protest for civil demonstrations and the rights of public employees to unionize and protest perceived injustice. The strike serves as a model for a successful, largely nonviolent protest against institutionalized injustice and is remembered today as a significant milestone for workers' rights and racial equality in University and North Carolina history.

== Causes and background ==
The progress of the University of North Carolina, Chapel Hill during the 1960s mirrored many other Universities in the South undergoing integration. Despite a non-academic employee work force composed almost entirely of African-Americans, black presence in the student body lagged behind significantly, reaching nearly 1.5% in 1968, and only one black professor taught on campus. While academic, admission and employment equality were the official University of North Carolina System policies following the passage of the Civil Rights Act of 1964, the experience of food workers on campus proved otherwise. Employee complaints included receiving below-minimum wage, compulsory time spent on campus without pay, split shifts and working under white supervisors who harbored discriminatory attitudes, among others. As similar events, such as the Allen Building Takeover at Duke University, demonstrated, desegregation existed only nominally, but according to many African Americans, discrimination still flourished. Despite formally organizing and proposing responses to what they perceived were the problems of their employment, the food workers' requests received little to no response from the University's Administration, while simultaneous layoffs further provoked employees to escalate the issue.

== The strike and student involvement in protests ==
Two staff members, Mary Smith and Elizabeth Brooks, emerged as the employees' leaders, and a formal protest was organized. On February 23, 1969, as Lenoir Hall opened for business, workers led by Smith vacated their posts in the Cafeteria and sat at the tables, refusing to yield to requests from their supervisors to resume their jobs. The following day, around 100 employees were absent from their jobs, and despite being urged to begin private negotiations with the University, the strike continued. Throughout the remainder of February, cafeteria workers organized rallies and speaker events on and off campus to maintain the strike's momentum and garner public support. Invoking a slogan of "It isn't slavery time anymore!", Mary Smith successfully coordinated public demonstrations and the reception to the protests resulting in increasing support from other workers and community members.

As students began to experience the effects of the strike and witness the plight of its participants, many joined the food workers to add to the collective voice bargaining with the University. The Black Student Movement, which was composed largely of former NAACP members after the UNC-CH Chapter of the national organization was closed, supported the food workers. Seizing the opportunity to expand the strike into a larger movement for racial equality, the BSM rallied with the food workers and issued an expanded list of demands that included the establishment of an African-American Studies department and the expansion of black aid programs. Another group to join the movement was the Campus Y student organization, which states its goal as "the pursuit of social justice through promoting pluralism." Kay Goldstein, who was an undergraduate at Chapel Hill from 1967-1972, described Campus Y as the heart of social movements on campus and a place where interested people gathered during the strike and other protests to brainstorm protests and fundraising activities. After weeks of little to no progress, roused students took it upon themselves to expand the protests, and on Tuesday, March 4, 1969, fights and rioting erupted; students overturned tables and vandalized Lenoir Hall, forcing its closure. By appealing to students who already opposed the conservative establishment that they felt dominated politics and education, the protestors earned the support of a passionate and vocal group whose voice could not go unanswered by the Administration.

== Expansion of the strike and police response ==
Following the escalation of the protest, Governor Scott ordered the positioning of the National Guard and of riot-police in Chapel Hill to ensure the safe reopening of Lenoir Hall by Thursday, March 6. The escalation and subsequent mobilization of police splintered the University community, prompting students, faculty, staff and administrators to side with either the protestors or the Administration. Because of the degree of student involvement, University leadership viewed the strike as a form of student disruption, and Governor Scott ordered the arrest of students who refused to vacate Manning Hall, the protestors' headquarters. The involvement of police following the violence embodied a radicalization of the strike, bringing activists and their opposition to direct public confrontation. This was an important step as desegregation had reached a plateau: legally, most public forms of discrimination had been outlawed, but many felt the experience of minority individuals had hardly improved.

=== Counterculture and the New Left ===
The food workers' cause was quick to gain support among students and other members of the University community. Many of these individuals were of different races and socioeconomic status, but they were unified in common opposition, not experience. Concurrent to the Civil Rights Movement was the American Counterculture Movement of the 1960s and 1970s that emerged on college campuses throughout the country. Stemming from opposition to the Vietnam War and conscription, strict criminal policies toward drug use as part of the war on drugs, and sexual repression, among others, the Counterculture Movement easily incorporated the civil rights battle as yet another source of discontent. During the 1960s, popular issues of the time began to transcend race towards greater criticisms of American society: this transition allowed for common experience and partnership between people of all races with shared opposition. Student groups comprised the academic branch of the New Left, and by the 1970s, the fight for civil equality became a fundamental aspect of the Counterculture's anti-establishment revolution. High-profile demonstrations at campuses including the University of California, Berkeley and Columbia University emphasized civil rights and the challenging of authority at the forefront of their cause, and this sentiment echoed at UNC-CH. The argument against accelerating the process of desegregation became one of conservative, apathetic politicians and academic administrators, positioned against the momentous wave of social liberalism.

== Response to the strike ==
In addition to raising questions regarding the status of race on college campuses, the Food Worker Strike also brought attention to the rights of public employees to strike. As employees of the North Carolina Department of Public Instruction, the striking food workers violated the terms of their employment which prohibited the disruption of University functions because of contractual complaints. From the workers' perspective, they were being subjected to exploitative working conditions because of their race and wage bracket, and for this reason, the strike was necessary as a means of restoring human dignity. While it did not result in national attention, the Lenoir Strike proved a controversial instance in which the state government was forced to draw the line between maintaining order at public institutions and protecting human rights under the law.

=== Unionization ===
After the initial negotiations to end the strike stalemated, the protestors decided that unionizing was the best way to continue, and they formed the UNC Non-Academic Employees Union. By engaging in collective bargaining, the State government effectively condoned the right for public employees to unionize and strike as long as it did not create a serious interruption of public services. This right would not be challenged again on a national level until the Air Traffic Controller Strike under the Reagan Administration. In addition, it allowed university employee unions to seek the support of students and faculty, both as members of their protests and for financial support. School and State administrators identified the newly formed union as the official voice of the strike, and the body with which further negotiations would be conducted.

== Resumption and resolution of the strike ==
In the months following the resolution to the Lenoir Strike, the government implemented statewide changes in accordance with the worker's collective demands. Among these, a minimum wage increase to $1.80 for public University employees was implemented, affecting around 5000 individuals, in addition to the hiring of black supervisors and additional overtime pay. Because of the impact of the strike and the critical attention brought to the University, administrators chose to contract the management of campus food to SAGA Food Services on May 19. While not initially a source of concern, the change in employer marked a return to the initial working conditions that sparked the strike. A large number of employees were laid off and soon after, the working conditions of those who remained once again deteriorated. In an interview, Elizabeth Brook explains that under SAGA management, Lenoir employees were strictly prohibited from talking with students to prevent unrest; however, general dissatisfaction with the terms of the food worker's employment was still well known.

On November 7, around 250 workers resumed the strike, and in the following months, much more active forms of protest were used to garner a public response from SAGA. Student groups convened forums to address the issues from their perspectives, and speakers and civil rights leaders were invited to Chapel Hill to bring attention to the ongoing Strike. After nearly a month of striking, police arrested nine members of the Black Student Movement, some of whom helped coordinate the food workers' unionization, and charged them failure to disperse and disorderly conduct. Reverend Ralph Abernathy joined the protest on December 6 to show his solidarity with the workers and to pledge "his spiritual, moral and financial support if not [his] physical presence." In this second round of protest, the public support of leaders and outspoken youth allowed for a quicker resolution when negotiations stalled. Mary Smith organized an event that she named "Black Monday", a day in which thousand of supporters of the food workers agreed to descend upon the campus to force an end to the stalemate. The strike came to a final end on December 9, 1969, one day after the proposed "Black Monday", and although lesser contractual disputes continued to arise over the coming years, many of the employee demands were accepted and enacted in the following five years.
