= Richmond 34 =

Virginia Union University students who participated in a 1960 sit-in

The Richmond 34 refers to a group of Virginia Union University students who participated in a nonviolent sit-in at the lunch counter of Thalhimers department store in downtown Richmond, Virginia. The event was one of many sit-ins to occur throughout the civil rights movement in the 1960s and was essential to helping desegregate the city of Richmond.

== Background ==
Like many cities in the early 1960s, downtown Richmond, Virginia was segregated. In department stores, African Americans were allowed to buy clothes but were not allowed to try them on or return them. The lunch counters at these department stores were either segregated or they simply did not serve African Americans at all.

Inspired by the Greensboro sit-ins and Martin Luther King Jr. (who had given a talk at Virginia Union University on January 1, 1960), students at VUU planned to hold nonviolent sit-in at department stores in downtown Richmond, Virginia.

== Actions at Thalhimers department store ==
On the morning of February 22, 1960, 34 students from Virginia Union University went to Thalhimers Department Store located in the heart of downtown Richmond, Virginia. They walked into the department store and sat down at the whites-only lunch counter and demanded to be served. The students were then asked to leave and when they failed to do so were arrested and charged with trespassing. They were taken to jail but then shortly released on bail.

== Legal issues ==
The Richmond 34 all saw court sometime in March 1960 and were all convicted of trespassing and were fined $20 each. All 34 members later appealed this decision. The case soon made it to the Virginia Supreme court where the Richmond 34's original conviction was upheld. The court judged that it was the shop owners' constitutional right to forgo service to someone. The 34 members then decided to appeal to the Supreme Court.

The Supreme Court's attitude towards sit-ins was uncertain before the 34s' appeal but decided in 1963 to grant a GVR, in essence repealing the 34s' convictions. The protestors were found innocent of their crimes, in another major victory for Civil Rights in the United States.

== Overall impact ==
For nearly a year after African Americans set up boycotts of stores with segregated facilities and picket lines to encourage people to not buy from stores with segregation.

The economic impact on downtown business was difficult to manage for the store owners so, very quietly, they decided to integrate all of the main floor lunch counters. By the end of 1960, Thalhimers had integrated its facilities. Almost a year after the Richmond 34 were arrested, the Richmond Room was desegregated. A group of the original protestors went, to see if they would receive service. One of the protestors, Leroy Bray, recalled, "We were served, and it was over."

In 1963, William Thalhimer Jr., was asked by President John F. Kennedy to come to Washington to consult with him before he sent his civil rights bill to congress.

== Legacy ==
The Richmond 34 sit-in at Thalhimers Department store went largely unremembered until 2010 despite its important impact on the desegregation of Richmond, VA and the overall civil rights movement.

In February 2010, Virginia Union University played host to a celebration for the Richmond 34. This was held in honor of the group's 50th anniversary of the sit-in and it was the first celebration of its kind for the group.

In addition to the 50th anniversary celebration, a memorial mile marker honoring the 34 was placed where Thalhimers once stood.

== Members of the Richmond 34 ==
Alphabetically, the following were the sit-in members who became known collectively as the Richmond 34: Leroy M. Bray Jr., Gordon Coleman, Gloria C. Collins, Robert B. Dalton, Joseph E. Ellison, Marise L. Ellison, Wendell T. Foster Jr., Anderson J. Franklin, Woodrow B. Grant, Albert Van Graves Jr., George Wendall Harris Jr., Thalma Y. Hickman, Joanna Hinton, Carolyn Ann Horne, Richard C. Jackson, Elizabeth Patricia Johnson, Ford Tucker Johnson Jr., Milton Johnson, Celia E. Jones, Clarence A. Jones, John J. McCall, Frank George Pinkston, Larry Pridgen, Leotis L. Pryor, Raymond B. Randolph Jr., Samuel T. Shaw, Charles Melvin Sherrod, Virginia G. Simms, Ronald B. Smith, Barbara A. Thornton, Randolph A. Tobias, Donald Vincent-Goode, Patricia A. Washington, and Lois B. White.
