= Nashville sit-ins =

Nonviolent protests against racial segregation in Tennessee (1960)

- Part of the Sit-in movement in the Civil Rights Movement
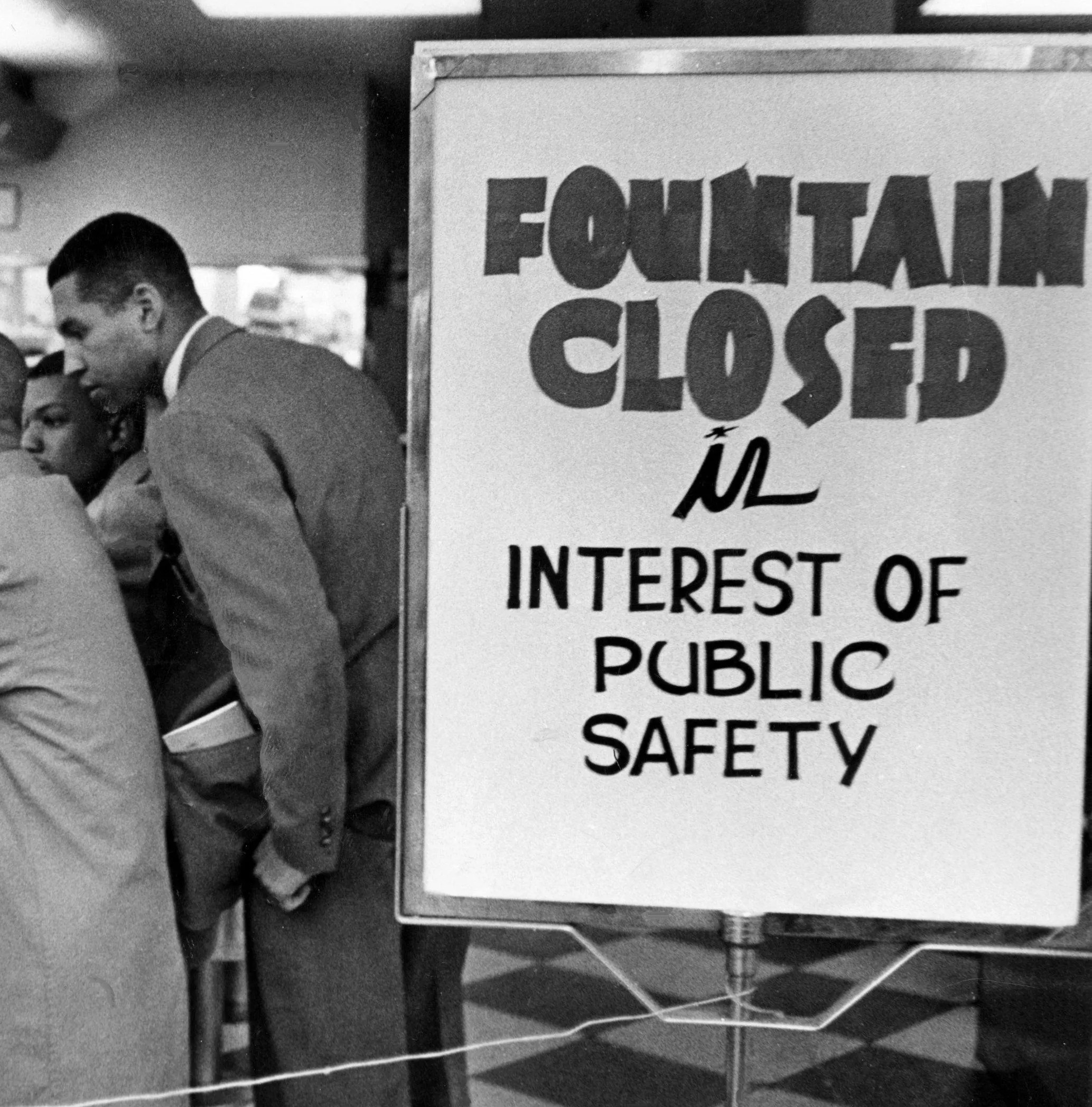
- Nashville's sit-in campaign occurred at downtown lunch counters such as this one at Walgreens drugstore.
- Date: February 13 – May 10, 1960 (2 months, 3 weeks and 6 days)
- Location: Nashville, Tennessee, US
- Caused by: Racial segregation in public accommodations; Formation of Nashville Christian Leadership Council (NCLC); Workshops on the philosophy and tactic of nonviolent resistance by James Lawson
- Result: Formation of Nashville Student Movement; Initiation of Nashville merchant boycott; Mass march towards City Hall; Downtown businesses desegregate lunch counters

Parties
Nashville Student Movement; Students from: American Baptist Theological Seminary; Fisk University; Meharry Medical College; Tennessee Agricultural & Industrial; Pearl High School; Baptist Minister's Conference of Nashville (BMCN)	Business lunch counters at: Woolworths; S. H. Kress; Harveys; Cain-Sloan; Walgreens; McLellan; Grants; Moon-McGrath; Greyhound; Trailways

Lead figures
NCLC members: James Lawson; Kelly Miller Smith; Students: Diane Nash; James Bevel; Bernard Lafayette; John Lewis; Marion Barry; C. T. Vivian; Lawyers: Z. Alexander Looby; Robert E. Lillard; Avon Williams; Coyness Loyal Ennix Sr.	Businessmen: Fred Harvey; John Sloan

The Nashville sit-ins, which lasted from February 13 to May 10, 1960, were part of a protest to end racial segregation at lunch counters in downtown Nashville, Tennessee, United States. The sit-in campaign, coordinated by the Nashville Student Movement and the Nashville Christian Leadership Council, was notable for its early success and its emphasis on disciplined nonviolence. It was part of a broader sit-in movement that spread across the southern United States in the wake of the Greensboro sit-ins in North Carolina.

Over the course of the Nashville sit-in campaign, sit-ins were staged at numerous stores in the central business district. Over 150 students were eventually arrested for refusing to vacate store lunch counters when ordered to do so by police. At trial, the students were represented by a group of 13 lawyers, headed by Z. Alexander Looby. On April 19, Looby's home was bombed, although he escaped uninjured. Later that day, at least 3,000 people marched to City Hall to confront Mayor Ben West about the escalating violence. When asked if he believed the lunch counters in Nashville should be desegregated, West agreed that they should. After subsequent negotiations between the store owners and protest leaders, an agreement was reached during the first week of May. On May 10, six downtown stores began serving black customers at their lunch counters for the first time.

Although the initial campaign successfully desegregated downtown lunch counters, sit-ins, pickets, and protests against other segregated facilities continued in Nashville until passage of the Civil Rights Act of 1964, which ended overt, legally sanctioned segregation nationwide. Many of the organizers of the Nashville sit-ins went on to become important leaders in the Civil Rights Movement.

== Background ==
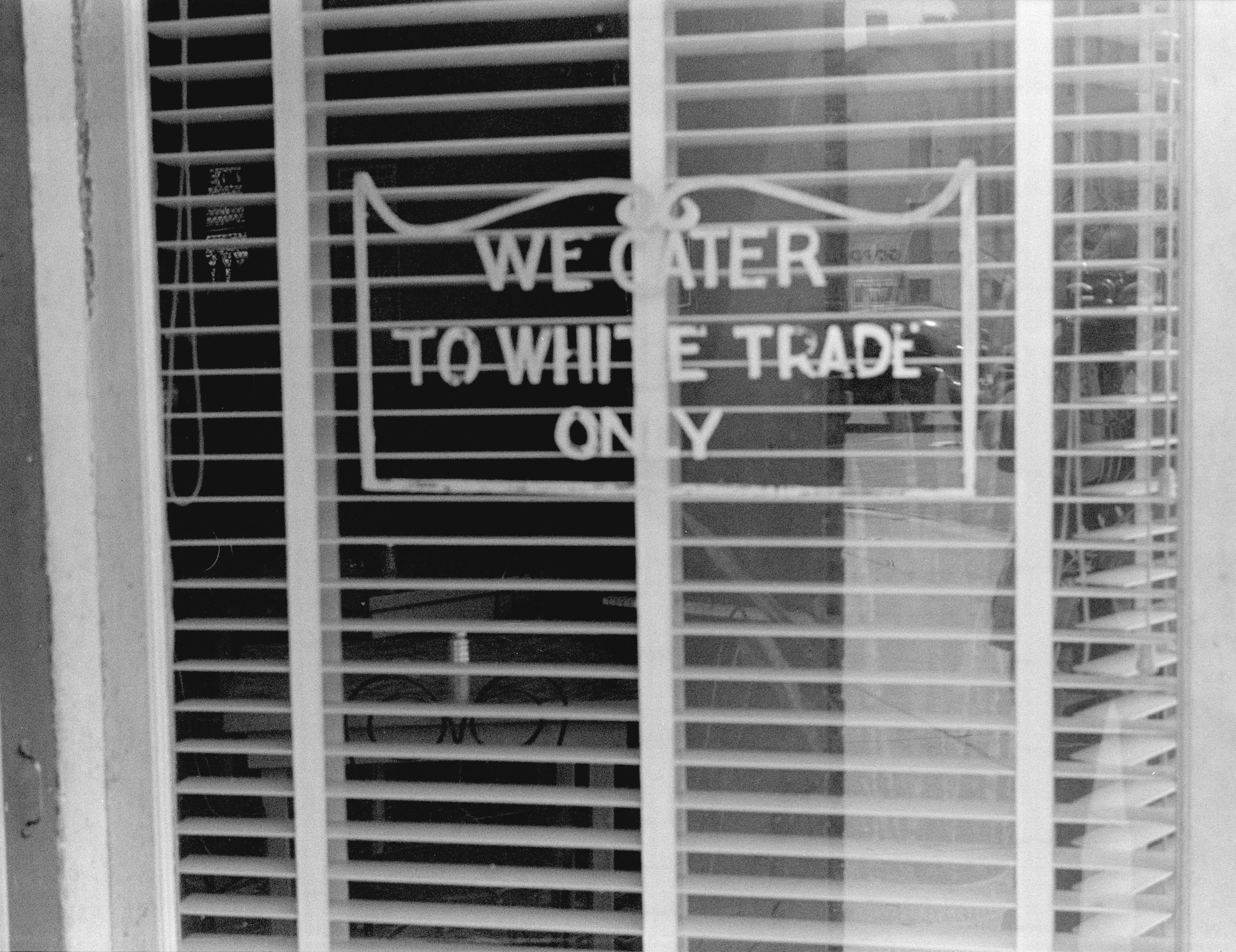
A sign on a restaurant window in Lancaster, Ohio, in 1938

In 1896, the United States Supreme Court decision Plessy v. Ferguson upheld the constitutionality of racial segregation under the doctrine of "separate but equal". This decision led to the proliferation of Jim Crow laws throughout the United States. These laws mandated or explicitly allowed segregation in virtually all spheres of public life and allowed racial discrimination to flourish across the country, especially in the southern United States.

In Nashville, like most Southern cities, African Americans were severely disadvantaged under the system of Jim Crow segregation. Besides being relegated to underfunded schools and barred from numerous public accommodations, African Americans had few prospects for skilled employment and were subject to constant discrimination from the white majority.

Although serious efforts were made to oppose Jim Crow laws in Nashville as early as 1905, (Note: Richard Henry Boyd, James Napier, Preston Taylor, and others organized a boycott against Nashville's segregated streetcar service that lasted from July 1905 until July 1906. More information about this strike can be found in Bobby Lovett's A Black Man's Dream.) it was not until 1958, with the formation of the Nashville Christian Leadership Council, that Nashville's African American community would lay the foundation for dismantling racial segregation.

== Precursors and organization ==
"We decided with great fear and anticipation we would desegregate downtown Nashville. No group of black people or other people anywhere in the United States in the 20th century, against the rapaciousness of a segregated system, ever thought about desegregating downtown."

— James Lawson, 2020

The Nashville Christian Leadership Council (or NCLC), was founded by the Reverend Kelly Miller Smith, pastor of First Baptist Church, Capitol Hill. This organization was an affiliate of Martin Luther King Jr.'s Southern Christian Leadership Conference (SCLC) and was established to promote civil rights for African Americans through nonviolent civil disobedience. Smith believed that White Americans would be more sympathetic to desegregation if African Americans obtained their rights through peaceful demonstration rather than through the judicial system or violent confrontation.

From March 26 to 28, 1958, the NCLC held the first of many workshops on using nonviolent tactics to challenge segregation. These workshops were led by James Lawson, who had studied the principles of nonviolent resistance while working as a missionary in India. Later workshops were mainly attended by students from Fisk University, Tennessee A&I (later Tennessee State University), American Baptist Theological Seminary (later American Baptist College), and Meharry Medical College. Among those attending Lawson's sessions were students who would become significant leaders in the Civil Rights Movement, among them: Marion Barry, James Bevel, Bernard Lafayette, John Lewis, Diane Nash, and C. T. Vivian.

During these workshops it was decided that the first target for the group's actions would be downtown lunch counters. At the time, African Americans were allowed to shop in downtown stores but were not allowed to eat in the stores' restaurants. The group felt that the lunch counters were a good objective because they were highly visible, easily accessible, and provided a stark example of the injustices black Southerners faced every day.

In late 1959, James Lawson and other members of the NCLC's projects committee met with department store owners Fred Harvey and John Sloan, and asked them to voluntarily serve African Americans at their lunch counters. Both men declined, saying that they would lose more business than they would gain. The students then began doing reconnaissance for sit-in demonstrations. The first test took place at Harveys Department Store in downtown Nashville on November 28, followed by the Cain-Sloan store on December 5. Small groups of students purchased items at the stores and then sat at their lunch counters and attempted to order food. Their goal was to try to sense the mood and degree of resistance in each store. Although they were refused service at both lunch counters, the reactions varied significantly. At Harveys, they received surprisingly polite responses, while at Cain-Sloan they were treated with contempt. These reconnaissance actions were low-key and neither of the city's newspapers was notified of them.

== Full-scale demonstrations ==
Before the students in Nashville had a chance to formalize their plans, events elsewhere brought renewed urgency to the effort. During the first week of February 1960, a small sit-in demonstration in Greensboro, North Carolina, grew into a significant protest with over eighty students participating by the third day. Although similar demonstrations had occurred previously in other cities, this was the first to attract substantial media attention and public notice. When Lawson's group met the subsequent Friday night, about 500 new volunteers showed up to join the cause. Although Lawson and other adult organizers argued for delay, the student leaders insisted that the time had come for action.

Downtown lunch counters targeted by the sit-ins included: 1. S. H. Kress; 2. McLellans; 3. Woolworths; 4. Harveys; 5. Walgreens; 6. Grants; 7. Cain-Sloan; 8. Greyhound; 9. Trailways; 10. Moon-McGrath

The first large-scale organized sit-in was on Saturday, February 13, 1960. At about 12:30 pm, 124 students, most of them black, walked into the downtown Woolworths, S. H. Kress, and McLellan stores and asked to be served at the lunch counters. After the staff refused to serve them, they sat in the stores for two hours and then left without incident.

On the Monday following the first sit-in, the Baptist Minister's Conference of Nashville, representing 79 congregations, unanimously voted to support the student movement, thus throwing the weight of Nashville's black religious community behind the students. Local religious leaders called on people of good will to boycott downtown merchants who practiced segregation. Nashville's black community strongly supported the boycott, causing economic hardship for the merchants.

The second sit-in occurred on Thursday, February 18, when more than 200 students entered Woolworths, S. H. Kress, McLellan's, and Grants. The lunch counters were immediately closed. The students remained for about half an hour and then left, again without incident. The third sit-in occurred on February 20 when about 350 students entered the previous four stores and the downtown Walgreens drugstore. As the students sat at the counters, crowds of white youths gathered in several of the stores. Police kept a watchful eye on all five locations, but no incidents of violence occurred. The students remained for nearly three hours until adjourning to a mass meeting at the First Baptist Church.

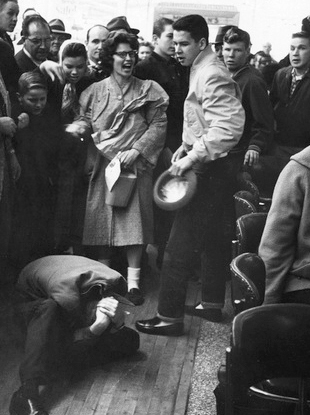
On February 27, several sit-in participants, including Paul Laprad (pictured), were attacked by onlookers.

Tensions mounted over the following week as sit-in demonstrations spread to other cities and race riots broke out in nearby Chattanooga. On February 27, the Nashville student activists held a fourth sit-in at the Woolworths, McLellan's, and Walgreens stores. Crowds of white youths again gathered in the stores to taunt and harass the demonstrators. This time, however, police were not present. Eventually, several of the sit-in demonstrators were attacked by hecklers in the McLellan's and Woolworths stores. Some were pulled from their seats and beaten, and one demonstrator was pushed down a flight of stairs. When police arrived, the white attackers fled, and none were arrested. Police then ordered the demonstrators at all three locations to leave the stores. When the demonstrators refused to leave, they were arrested and loaded into police vehicles as onlookers applauded. Eighty-one (Note: There are several conflicting sources on the number of students arrested on February 27: The initial story in The Tennessean claims 75 were arrested; a story in the Nashville Globe and Independent states that 79 were arrested; most later sources, such as Halberstam's The Children and Wynn's "The Dawning of a New Day", state that 81 students were arrested.) students were arrested and charged with loitering and disorderly conduct.

The arrests brought a surge of media coverage to the sit-in campaign, including national television news coverage, front-page stories in both of Nashville's daily newspapers, and an Associated Press story. The students generally viewed any media coverage as helpful to their cause, especially when it illustrated their commitment to nonviolence.

Several other sit-ins took place over the following two months, resulting in more arrests and further attacks against sit-in participants. Over 150 students were arrested. Throughout the demonstrations, the student activists maintained a policy of disciplined nonviolence. Their written code of conduct became a model followed by demonstrators in other cities:

"Do not strike back or curse if abused. Do not laugh out. Do not hold conversations with the floor walker. Do not leave your seat until your leader has given you permission to do so. Do not block entrances to stores outside nor the aisles inside. Do show yourself courteous and friendly at all times. Do sit straight; always face the counter. Do report all serious incidents to your leader. Do refer information seekers to your leader in a polite manner. Remember the teachings of Jesus, Gandhi, Martin Luther King. Love and nonviolence is the way."

== Trials and Lawson expulsion ==
The trials of the sit-in participants attracted widespread interest throughout Nashville and the surrounding region. On February 29, the first day of the trials, a crowd of more than 2000 people lined the streets surrounding the city courthouse to show their support for the defendants. A group of 13 lawyers, headed by Z. Alexander Looby, represented the students. (Note: According to Fisk News and Nashville Globe and Independent, the lawyers representing the students were: Z. Alexander Looby; Robert Lillard; Avon Williams; Coyness L. Ennix; A. J. Steel; J. F. McClellan; R. B. J. Campbell, Jr.; Adolph Birch; W. D. Hawkins, Jr.; Roscoe Hamby; William Blakemore; E. B. Lindsey; and Eugene White.) Initially, the trial was presided over by City Judge Andrew J. Doyle. Doyle dismissed the loitering charges against the students and then stepped down from the bench, turning the trial over to Special City Judge John I. Harris.

Despite strong support from the black community, all the students who had been arrested were convicted of disorderly conduct and fined $50. The students refused to pay the fines, however, and chose instead to serve thirty-three days in the county workhouse. Diane Nash issued a statement on behalf of the students explaining the decision: "We feel that if we pay these fines we would be contributing to and supporting the injustice and immoral practices that have been performed in the arrest and conviction of the defendants."

The same day the trials began, a group of black ministers, including James Lawson, met with Mayor Ben West to discuss the sit-ins. Coverage of the meeting by the local press, including a scathing editorial in the Nashville Banner denouncing Lawson as a "flannel-mouth agitator", brought Lawson's activities to the attention of Vanderbilt University where he was enrolled as a Divinity School student. The newspaper was owned by James G. Stahlman, a Vanderbilt trustee who was "strongly anti-integration"; it published misleading stories, including the suggestion that Lawson had incited others to "violate the law." When Lawson was confronted by Vanderbilt's executive committee and told he would have to end his involvement with the sit-ins, Lawson refused. He was immediately expelled from the university by Chancellor Harvie Branscomb, and arrested the next day. Dean J. Robert Nelson resigned in protest and paid Lawson's bail with three of his colleagues, and the school was placed on probation for a year by the American Association of Theological Schools.

== Biracial Committee ==
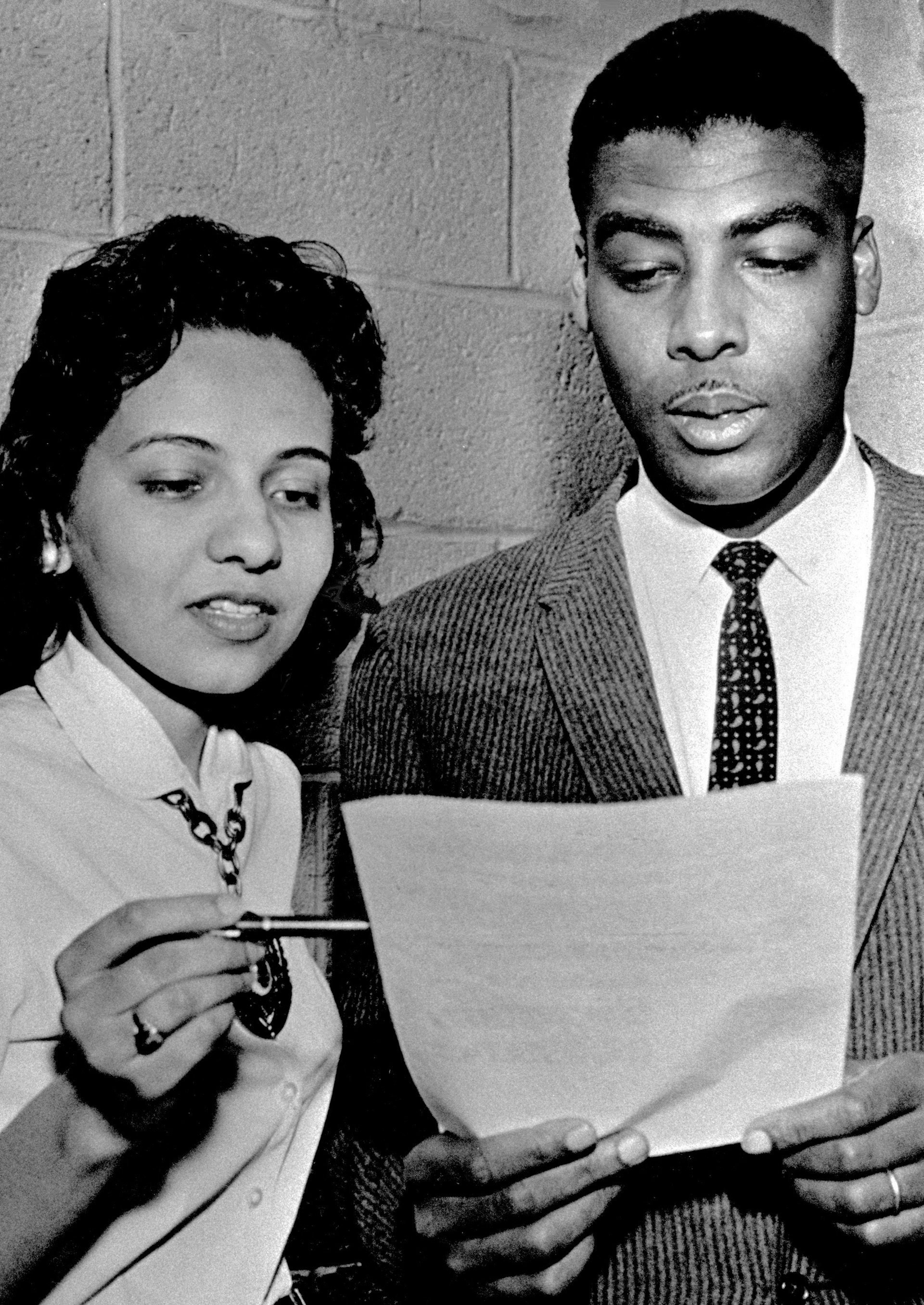
Diane Nash and Kelly Miller Smith review a prepared statement in response to the Biracial Committee's recommendation to partially integrate store lunch counters.

On March 3, in an effort to defuse the racial tensions caused by the sit-ins, Mayor West announced the formation of a Biracial Committee to seek a solution to the city's racial strife. The committee included the presidents of two of the city's black universities, but did not include any representatives from the student movement. The committee met several times over the next month and delivered its recommendations in a report on April 5. The committee recommended partially integrating the city's lunch counters. Each store would have one section for whites only and another for whites and blacks. This solution was rejected by the student leaders, who considered the recommendations morally unacceptable and based upon a segregation policy. Less than a week after the Biracial Committee issued its report, the sit-ins resumed, and the boycott of downtown businesses was intensified.

== Looby residence bombing ==
At 5:30 am on April 19, dynamite was thrown through a front window of Z. Alexander Looby's home in north Nashville, apparently in retaliation for his support of the demonstrators. Although the explosion almost destroyed the house, Looby and his wife, who were asleep in a back bedroom, were not injured. The blast broke more than 140 windows in a nearby dormitory.

Rather than discouraging the protesters, this event served as a catalyst for the movement. Within hours, news of the bombing had spread throughout the community. Around noon, nearly 4000 people marched silently to City Hall to confront the mayor. Mayor West met the marchers at the courthouse steps. Reverend C. T. Vivian read a prepared statement accusing the mayor of ignoring the moral issues involved in segregation and turning a blind eye to violence and injustice. Diane Nash then asked the mayor if he felt it was wrong to discriminate against a person based solely on their race or skin color. West answered that he agreed it was wrong. Nash then asked him if he believed that lunch counters in the city should be desegregated. West answered, "Yes", then added, "That's up to the store managers, of course."

Coverage of this event varied significantly between Nashville's two major newspapers. The Tennessean emphasized the mayor's agreement that lunch counters should be desegregated, while the Nashville Banner emphasized the mayor's statement that it was up to the city's merchants to decide whether to desegregate. This was largely indicative of the two papers' opposing stances on the issue. Regardless, the mayor's response was later cited as an important turning point by both activists and Nashville business owners.

The day after the bombing, Martin Luther King Jr. came to Nashville to speak at Fisk University. During the speech, he praised the Nashville sit-in movement as "the best organized and the most disciplined in the Southland." He further stated that he came to Nashville "not to bring inspiration but to gain inspiration from the great movement that has taken place in this community."

== Desegregation ==
After weeks of secret negotiations between merchants and protest leaders, an agreement was finally reached during the first week of May. According to the agreement, small, selected groups of African Americans would order food at the downtown lunch counters on a day known in advance to the merchants. The merchants would prepare their employees for the event and instruct them to serve the customers without trouble. This arrangement would continue in a controlled manner for a couple of weeks, and then all controls would be taken off, at which point the merchants and protest leaders would reconvene to evaluate the results. Also, as part of the agreement, the media was to be informed of the settlement and requested to provide only accurate, non-sensational coverage.

On May 10, six downtown stores opened their lunch counters to black customers for the first time. The customers arrived in groups of two or three during the afternoon and were served without incident. At the same time, African Americans ended their six-week-old boycott of the downtown stores. The plan continued successfully and the lunch counters were integrated without any further incidents of violence. Nashville thus became the first major city in the southern United States to begin desegregating its public facilities.

Although the end of the sit-in campaign brought a brief respite for civil rights activists in Nashville, institutionalized racism remained a problem throughout the city. Over the next few years, further sit-ins, pickets, and other actions would take place at restaurants, movie theaters, public swimming pools, and other segregated facilities across Nashville. These actions continued until Congress passed the Civil Rights Act of 1964, which prohibited segregation in public places throughout the United States. That year, many of the key figures of the sit-ins, including James Lawson and Kelly Miller Smith, were interviewed by Robert Penn Warren for his book Who Speaks for the Negro?.

== Fiftieth anniversary ==
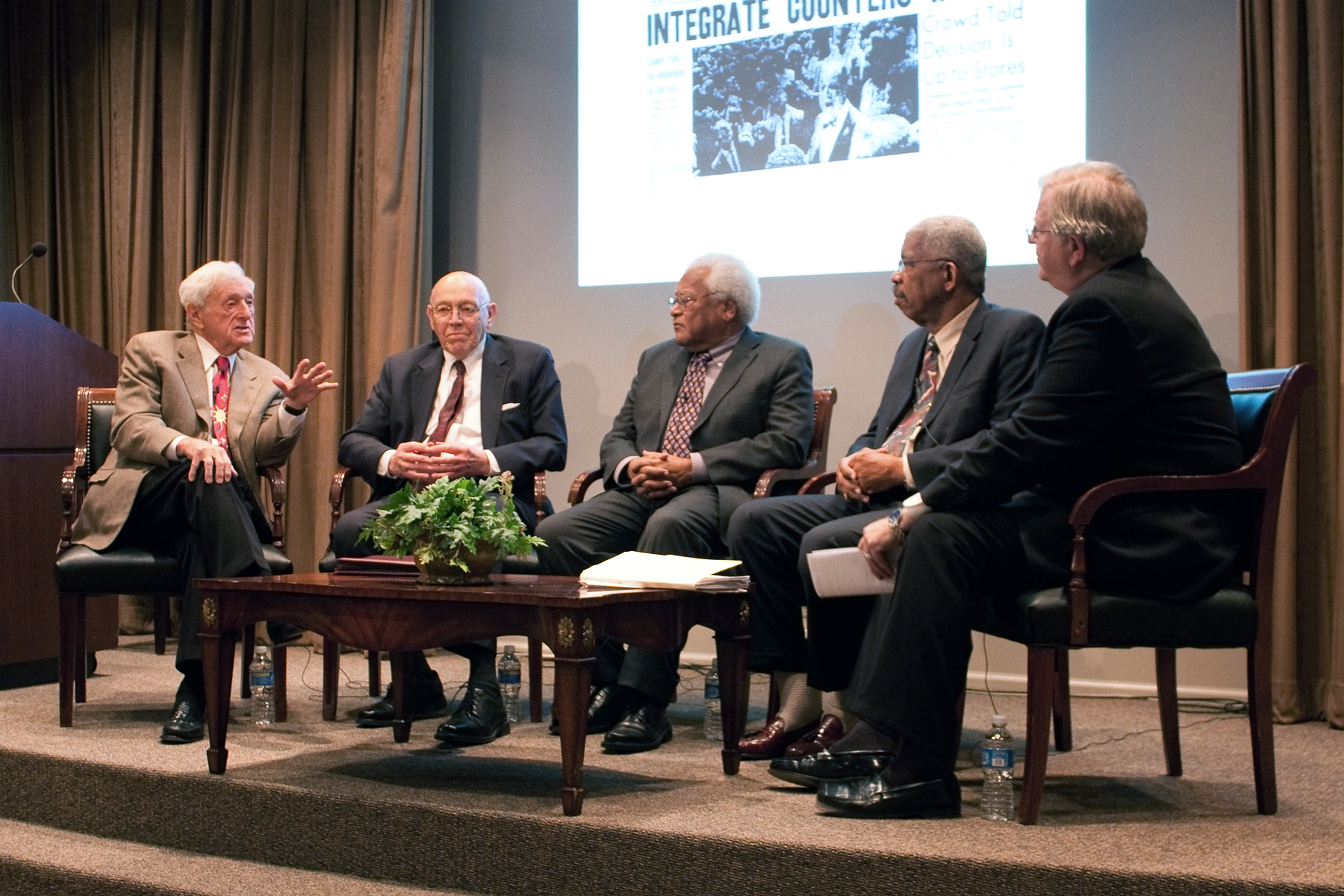
A panel including John Seigenthaler (left) and James Lawson (center) discuss media coverage of the Nashville sit-ins.

Several events were held in 2010 in order to mark the fiftieth anniversary of the Nashville sit-ins.

- On January 20, Vanderbilt University hosted a panel discussion entitled "Veterans of the Nashville Sit-ins – The Struggle Continues". The featured speakers were Kwame Leo Lillard and Matthew Walker Jr.
- Tennessee State Museum hosted an exhibition from February 4 to May 16 entitled "We Shall Not Be Moved: The 50th Anniversary of Tennessee's Civil Rights Sit-Ins".
- At Tennessee State University on February 10, the 29th annual Conference on African American History and Culture held a special commemoration of the sit-ins, with Diane Nash as the featured guest speaker.
- On February 12, Vanderbilt University hosted a panel discussion on media coverage of the Nashville sit-ins. The featured speakers were James Lawson and John Seigenthaler.
- The downtown Nashville library hosted a photography exhibit entitled "Visions & Voices: The Civil Rights Movement in Nashville & Tennessee" from February 9 to May 22.
- Author and commentator Juan Williams led a forum to discuss civil rights issues at the downtown Nashville library auditorium on February 13.

== Bibliography ==
- Branch, Taylor (1988). Parting the Waters: America in the King Years 1954–63. New York: Simon & Schuster. ISBN 0-671-68742-5.
- Carson, Clayborne (1981). In Struggle: SNCC and the Black Awakening of the 1960s. Cambridge, Massachusetts: Harvard University Press. ISBN 0-674-44727-1.
- Glisson, Susan M. (2006). The Human Tradition in the Civil Rights Movement. Lanham, Maryland: Rowman & Littlefield. ISBN 0-7425-4409-5.
- Halberstam, David (1998). The Children. New York: Random House. ISBN 0-449-00439-2.
- Hampton, Henry; Fayer, Steve (1990). Voices of Freedom: An Oral History of the Civil Rights Movement from the 1950s through the 1980s. Bantam Books. ISBN 0-553-05734-0.
- Hogan, Wesley C. (2007). Many Minds, One Heart: SNCC's Dream for a New America. Chapel Hill: University of North Carolina Press. ISBN 978-0-8078-3074-1.
- Houston, Benjamin (2012). The Nashville Way: Racial Etiquette and the Struggle for Social Justice in a Southern City. Athens, Georgia: University of Georgia Press. ISBN 978-0-8203-4326-6.
- Klarman, Michael J. (2004). From Jim Crow to Civil Rights: The Supreme Court and the Struggle for Racial Equality. New York: Oxford University Press. ISBN 0-19-512903-2.
- Lewis, John (1998). Walking with the Wind: A Memoir of the Movement. New York: Simon & Schuster. ISBN 0-15-600708-8.
- Lovett, Bobby L. (1993). A Black Man's Dream: The First 100 Years: Richard Henry Boyd and the National Baptist Publishing Board. Nashville: Mega Publishing. ISBN 1-56742-032-X.
- Lovett, Bobby L.; Wynn, Linda T., eds. (1996). Profiles of African Americans in Tennessee. Nashville: Annual Local Conference on Afro-American Culture and History, Tennessee State University. LCCN 96137467.
- Sumner, David E. (1989). The Local Press and the Nashville Student Movement, 1960 (PhD thesis). Knoxville: University of Tennessee. ProQuest 303789628.
- Wynn, Linda T. (1991). "The dawning of a new day: The Nashville sit-ins, February 13, 1960 – May 10, 1960". Tennessee Historical Quarterly. 50 (1): 42–54.
