= The Children (book) =

1998 non-fiction book

- First edition cover
- Author: David Halberstam
- Cover artist: David Halberstam
- Language: English
- Publisher: Ballantine Books
- Publication date: 1998
- Publication place: United States
- Pages: 816
- ISBN: 0-449-00439-2

The Children is a 1998 book by David Halberstam which chronicles the 1959–1962 Nashville Student Movement.

Among the topics covered are the Nashville sit-ins, the Freedom Riders, the formation of SNCC, and activists including James Lawson, James Bevel, Diane Nash, John Lewis, Bernard Lafayette, Marion Barry, and C. T. Vivian.

The book was described by Kirkus Reviews as "a powerful account of a critical time in American history, related in both close-up and wide view." Publishers Weekly called the work "at once intimate and monumental", making note of its "brief, informative essays" on "the sociology of all-white Vanderbilt University; the eccentricities of the Nashville newspapers; a history of city politics in Washington, D.C." and "the role of the Kennedy Justice Department."

External videos
- Discussion at Fisk University with Halberstam and panelists who were profiled in The Children, March 26, 1998, C-SPAN
