= 100 Oaks Mall =

Medical and retail complex in Nashville, Tennessee, U.S.

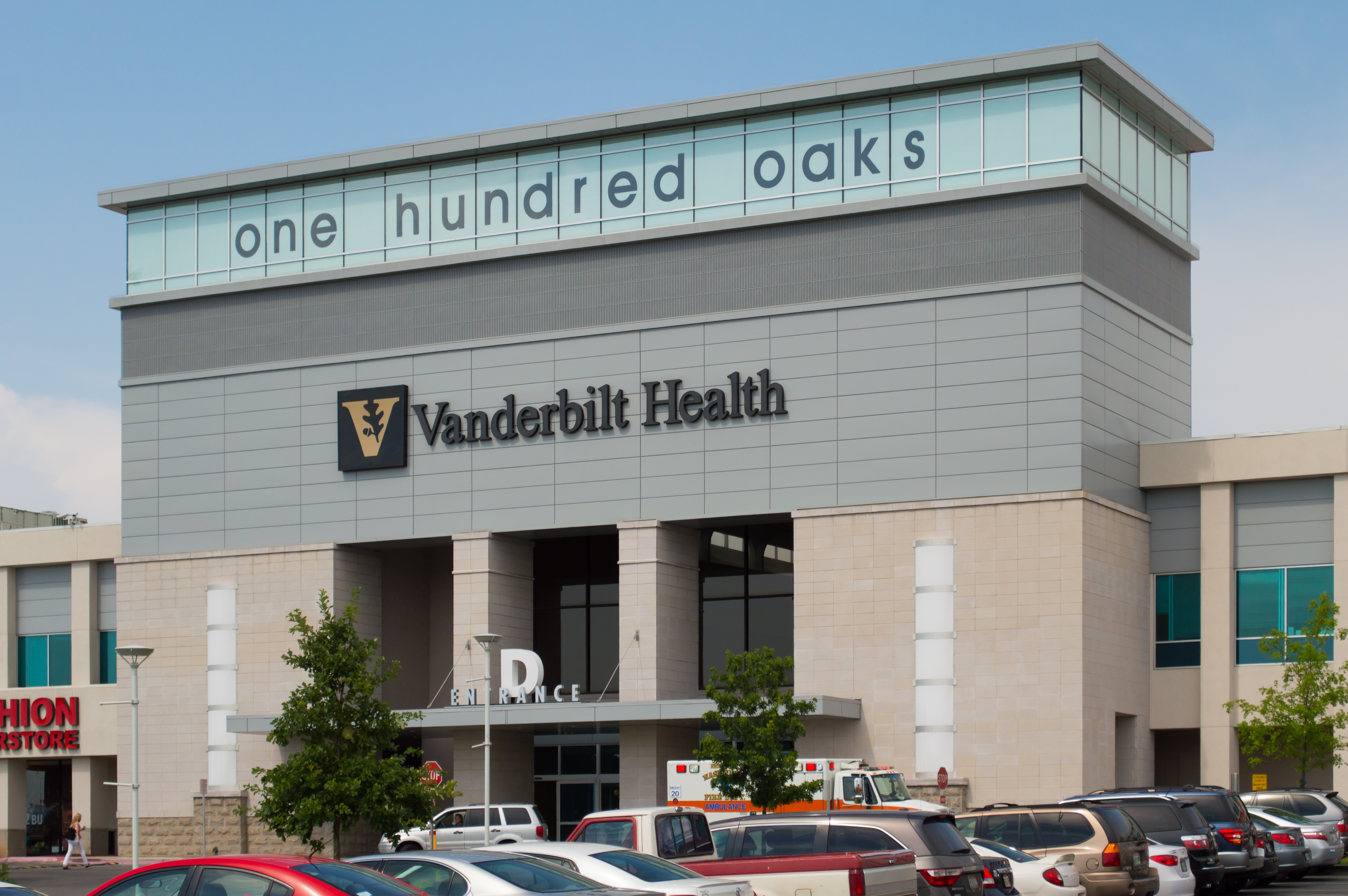
- The main entrance to the Vanderbilt Health facilities at 100 Oaks Mall
- Location: Nashville, Tennessee, U.S.
- Coordinates: 36.108895°N 86.764076°W
- Address: 719 Thompson Lane
- Opened: October 27, 1967
- Closed: 2009 (partially converted into a medical center)
- Website: onehundredoaksmall.com

100 Oaks Mall (sometimes written out as One Hundred Oaks Mall) is a mixed-use medical and retail complex (formerly an enclosed shopping mall) located three miles south of downtown Nashville, Tennessee, United States, along Interstate 65 and Tennessee State Route 155. Neighborhoods and cities around the area include Berry Hill, Woodbine and Oak Hill.

== History ==
The mall was Nashville's second enclosed shopping area, originally opening on October 27, 1967, after Harding Mall opened two years before. Original tenants included Penneys, Woolco and Harveys. Woolco closed in 1983, although Burlington Coat Factory would open in the former space that November. JCPenney closed in January 1986, furthering a slow decline for 100 Oaks, and the mall was purchased by Belz Enterprises later in the year. In September 1991, Belz closed 100 Oaks' interior mall space, allowing tenants with outside entrances to stay open. Morrison's Cafeteria closed its 100 Oaks location a month later due to declining business and mall tenancy.

Belz Enterprises re-developed the center between 1995 and 1996 as an outlet mall, introducing big-box stores such as Michaels, Media Play, and TJ Maxx. Following an extensive renovation in 2008, the bottom floor of the mall remains open for retail, with major tenants including hhgregg (now defunct), Kirkland's, Electronic Express, and PetSmart. The upper floor and office building are now used for medical clinics and administrative offices operated by Vanderbilt University Medical Center. The mall's redevelopment into a mixed-use medical and retail complex was completed in 2009. Tennessee's largest movie theater, the Regal Cinemas Hollywood 27, is located next to the mall.
