= John Sloan Jr. =

American banking executive

John Sloan
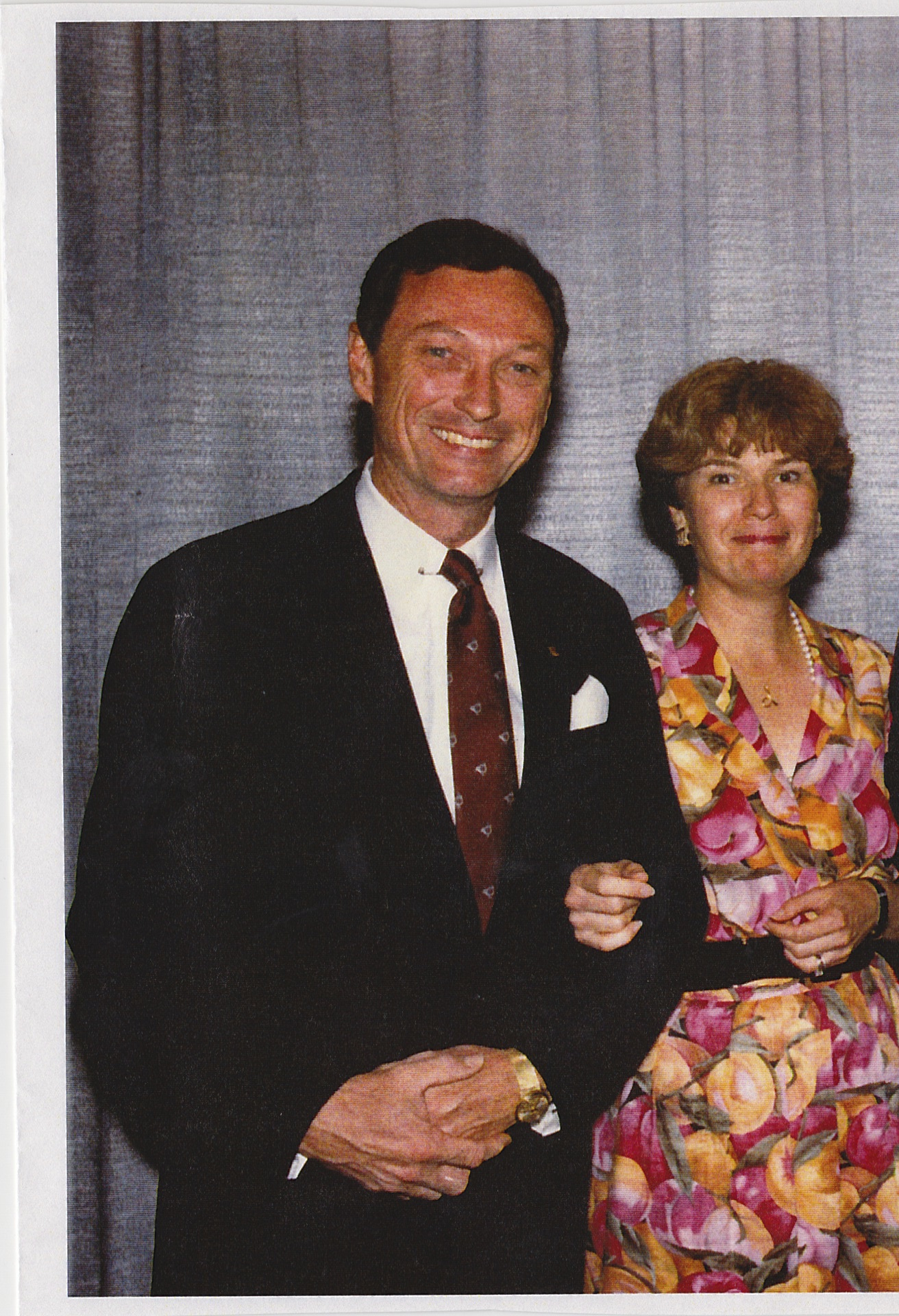
- John Sloan, Jr. President of the National Federation of Independence and Delphine Oman Sloan in Washington D.C.
- Born: John Sloan Jr. c. 1936
- Died: 1991; Franklin, Tennessee
- Resting place: Mount Olivet Cemetery, Nashville, Tennessee, U.S.
- Education: Vanderbilt University
- Occupation: Banker
- Spouse: Delphine Oman
- Children: John Elliott Sloan, Delphine Sloan Damon, John Oman Sloan, and Katherine Sloan
- Parent(s): John Sloan and Margaret Howe Sloan

John Sloan (c. 1936 – 1991) was an American banking executive. He was deeply involved in the small business community and was named to the National Advisory Council of the Small Business Administration. He was the president and chief executive officer of the National Federation of Independent Business from 1983 to 1991.

== Early life ==
Sloan was born in 1936. His grandfather Paul L Sloan was a co-founder of Cain-Sloan, a department store in Nashville. His paternal great-great-grandfather, George Sloan, was a friend of President James K. Polk.

Sloan graduated from Vanderbilt University and the Stonier Graduate School of Banking at Rutgers University. He served three active years as on officer (1959-1961) in the United States Navy.

== Career ==
Sloan served as the vice president of the First American National Bank and as president of the Harpeth National Bank. He later served as president and chief executive officer of the First Tennessee Bank of Nashville.

Sloan served as the president and chief executive officer of the National Federation of Independent Business from 1983 to 1991. In his last year as CEO, Sloan moved the NFIB from California to Nashville. In September 1991, he hosted their international conference in Nashville, where he invited small business owners from Eastern Europe.

He served on the board of directors of the First American Corporation and on the advisory board of the Federal Reserve Bank of San Francisco. He was a national director of the Boys' Club f America, National Junior Achievement, National Alliance of Business, National Legal Center for the Public Interest and Institute for Research on the Economics of taxation. His service also included the boards of Montgomery Bell Academy and Cranston Print Works Co., as well as the Department of Labor's Commission on Workforce Quality and Labor Market Efficiency and the President's Committee on Employment of People with Disabilities.

== Personal life and death ==
Sloan married Delphine Oman in 1964. They had two sons and two daughters; John Elliott Sloan, Delphine Sloan Damon, John Oman Sloan and Katherine Sloan. They resided in Franklin, Tennessee at their farm Cloverdale. Sloan competed in the Iroquois Steeplechase. He was a long time officer of the Iroquois Steeplechase, was an avid horseman and fifty-year member of the Hillsboro Hounds, as well as a Director of the Washington International Horse Show. He was a member of the Belle Meade Country Club. and the Metropolitan Club of Washington, D.C.

Sloan died of lung cancer in 1991 in Franklin. He was buried in Mount Olivet Cemetery.
