= Who Speaks for the Negro? =

1965 anthology of interviews by Robert Penn Warren

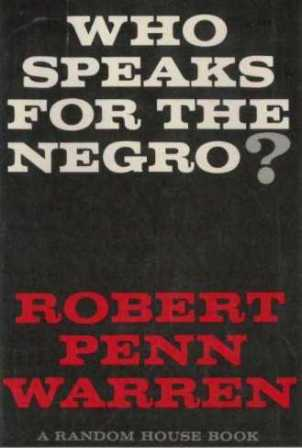
- Original Random House cover for Robert Penn Warren's book Who Speaks for the Negro?
- Author: Robert Penn Warren
- Language: English
- Publisher: Random House; reprinted by Yale University Press in 2014
- Publication date: 1965
- Publication place: United States
- Pages: 454
- Preceded by: Flood: A Romance of Our Time (1964)
- Followed by: Selected Poems: New and Old 1923–1966 (1966)

Who Speaks for the Negro? is a 1965 book of interviews by Robert Penn Warren conducted with Civil Rights Movement activists. The Robert Penn Warren Center for the Humanities at Vanderbilt University also created a Who Speaks for the Negro? digital archive featuring digitized versions of the original reel-to-reel recordings that Warren compiled for each of his interviewees as well as print materials related to the project, including the transcripts of those recordings, letters written between Warren and the interviewees, and contemporary reviews of the book. The book was reissued by Yale University Press in 2014.

== Background ==
In preparation for Random House's 1965 publication of his book Who Speaks for the Negro?, Warren traveled throughout the United States in early 1964 and spoke with large numbers of men and women who were involved in the Civil Rights Movement. He interviewed nationally known figures as well as people working in the trenches of the movement whose names might otherwise be lost to history. In each case, he recorded their conversations on a reel-to-reel tape recorder.

Often, Warren would begin by asking about the speakers' backgrounds, which often prompted them to talk about the inequalities that they had experienced that led to their participation in the Civil Rights Movement. Warren would also often ask the interviewees to respond to works from other writers, mainly W. E. B. Dubois's The Souls of Black Folk, Kenneth Clark's essays about the detrimental effects of segregation on children, Gunnar Myrdal's The American Dilemma, and James Baldwin's Nobody Knows My Name. As well, Warren would ask his interviewees their opinion on a number of key historical American figures, including Abraham Lincoln, Thomas Jefferson, William Lloyd Garrison, John Brown, and Robert E. Lee. While Warren was able to interview an impressive number of people, there are very few women in the collection. Missing from the interviewees list were several important figures from the Southern Christian Leadership Conference (Ralph Abernathy, James Bevel, Dorothy Cotton, and Fred Shuttlesworth), the Student Nonviolent Coordinating Committee (John Lewis, Diane Nash, Bernard Lafayette, and Julian Bond), and others including A. Philip Randolph.

The published volume contains sections of transcripts from the conversations as well as Warren's reflections on the individuals he interviewed and his thoughts on the state of the Civil Rights Movement. In the foreword to the volume, Warren insists on the book being a record of his desire to find out more about the Civil Rights Movement rather than an unbiased or comprehensive volume. Warren states in the foreword,

This book is not a history, a sociological analysis, an anthropological study, or a Who's Who of the Negro Revolution. It is a record of my attempt to find out what I could find out. It is primarily a transcript of conversations, with settings and commentaries. That is, I want to make my reader see, hear, and feel as immediately as possible what I saw, heard, and felt.

As an oral history of the Civil Rights Movement, Who Speaks may be compared to, among others, The New World of Negro Americans by Harold Isaacs, My Soul is Rested: Movement Days in the Deep South Remembered by Howell Raines, and My Soul Looks Back in Wonder: Voices of the Civil Rights Experience by Juan Williams.

== Reception ==
Who Speaks for the Negro? was reviewed widely by newspapers, cultural critics, and the general public. The tenor of the reviews varied greatly. Many news reviews—including those from the New York Herald Tribune, the Atlantic Monthly, the Chicago Tribune, and the Fort Worth Star-Telegram—gave the book very positive reviews. Charles Poore, in the New York Times, wrote that "a boon this book confers is to remind us that a main thrust in civilization can never cease to be toward decency and courtesy and justice for all." On the other hand, Warren received hate-mail from writers accusing him of "Communist 'propaganda' [and] advocacy of 'racial mixing.'" A Newsweek article called Warren "paternalistic." More moderately, Albert Murray called Who Speaks the "very best inside report on the Negro Civil Rights Movement by anyone so far" while still acknowledging Warren's segregationist past.

Though widely and for the most part positively reviewed, Who Speaks was not a commercial success, which disappointed Warren greatly. The book was out of print for decades until Yale University Press republished it in 2014 based largely on the traffic generated by the Who Speaks for the Negro? Digital Archive.

== Archive ==
Much of the original material related to the book is still in existence, held at the University of Kentucky and Yale University Libraries. In December 1964, Robert Penn Warren donated most of the material to the University of Kentucky. In his letter of donation to the University of Kentucky dated December 23, 1964, Warren stated "this, it would seem, is significant research material." The Louie B. Nunn Center for Oral History at the University of Kentucky Libraries provides access to the majority of the oral history interviews online.

=== Interviews ===
Warren grouped his interviews partly by geography and partly by theme. Each of the chapters consists of both narrativized and transcribed interviews and Warren's descriptions of setting, as well as deeper reflections inspired by the interviewees.

Chapter 1: The Cleft Stick

- Joe Carter
- Felton Grandison Clark
- Robert Collins, Nils Douglas, and Lolis Elie

Chapter 2: A Mississippi Journal

- Claire Collins Harvey
- Gilbert Moses and Richard Murphy
- Aaron Henry
- Bob Moses
- Charles Evers and Neil E. Goldschmidt

Chapter 3: The Big Brass

- Adam Clayton Powell Jr.
- Roy Wilkins
- Whitney Young
- James Forman
- James Farmer
- Martin Luther King Jr.
- Wyatt Tee Walker
- Bayard Rustin
- Malcolm X

Chapter 4: Leadership from the Periphery

- William H. Hastie
- James Baldwin
- John Harvey Wheeler
- Carl Rowan
- Kenneth Bancroft Clark
- Ralph Ellison

Chapter 5: The Young

- Ezell Blair Jr., Stokely Carmichael, Lucy Thornton, and Jean Wheeler
- Jackson State College Students
- Tougaloo College Students
- Stephen Wright
- Ruth Turner
- Stokely Carmichael

Not used in the book:

- Carroll Barber
- Wiley A. Branton
- Bridgeport Men
- Will D. Campbell
- Septima Poinsette Clark
- Dan W. Dodson
- Milton Galamison
- Richard Gunn
- Vernon Jordan
- Montgomery Wordsworth King
- James Lawson
- William Stuart Nelson
- Gloria Richardson
- Kelly Miller Smith
- William Stringfellow
- Avon Williams
- Andrew Young

The original interviews are archived at the Louie B. Nunn Center for Oral History at the University of Kentucky and Yale University Libraries. The Nunn Center provides online access to the interviews, which are searchable and streaming using an innovative system called OHMS (Oral History Metadata Synchronizer), which provides word level searches that are synchronized to the audio. Not all of the interviews made it directly into Warren's book. The original audiotapes, which are archived by the Nunn Center and Yale University Libraries, and materials for Who Speaks for the Negro? also contained interviews with the following people. The audio and transcripts for these, as well as full interviews from the persons mentioned above, are available at the Nunn Center, as well as in the online digital exhibit Who Speaks for the Negro? Digital Archive of the Robert Penn Warren Center for the Humanities and the Jean and Alexander Heard Libraries at Vanderbilt University. A digital exhibit The Robert Penn Warren Oral History Archive is a digital exhibit that combines the oral history interviews conducted for Who Speaks for the Negro? with oral history interviews conducted with Robert Penn Warren who reflects on changes in his perceptions of segregation over time. Warren reflects on segregation and the Civil Rights Movement in his Nunn Center oral history interview conducted on May 4, 1980.

== Further reading ==
- Kreyling, Michael (2010). The South That Wasn't There: Post-southern Memory and History. Baton Rouge: Louisiana State University Press. ISBN 978-0807136485.
- Joseph Blotner (1997). Robert Penn Warren: A Biography. New York City: Random House. ISBN 0394569571. OL 979825M.
