= Nashville Student Movement =

Civil rights movement in Nashville, Tennessee

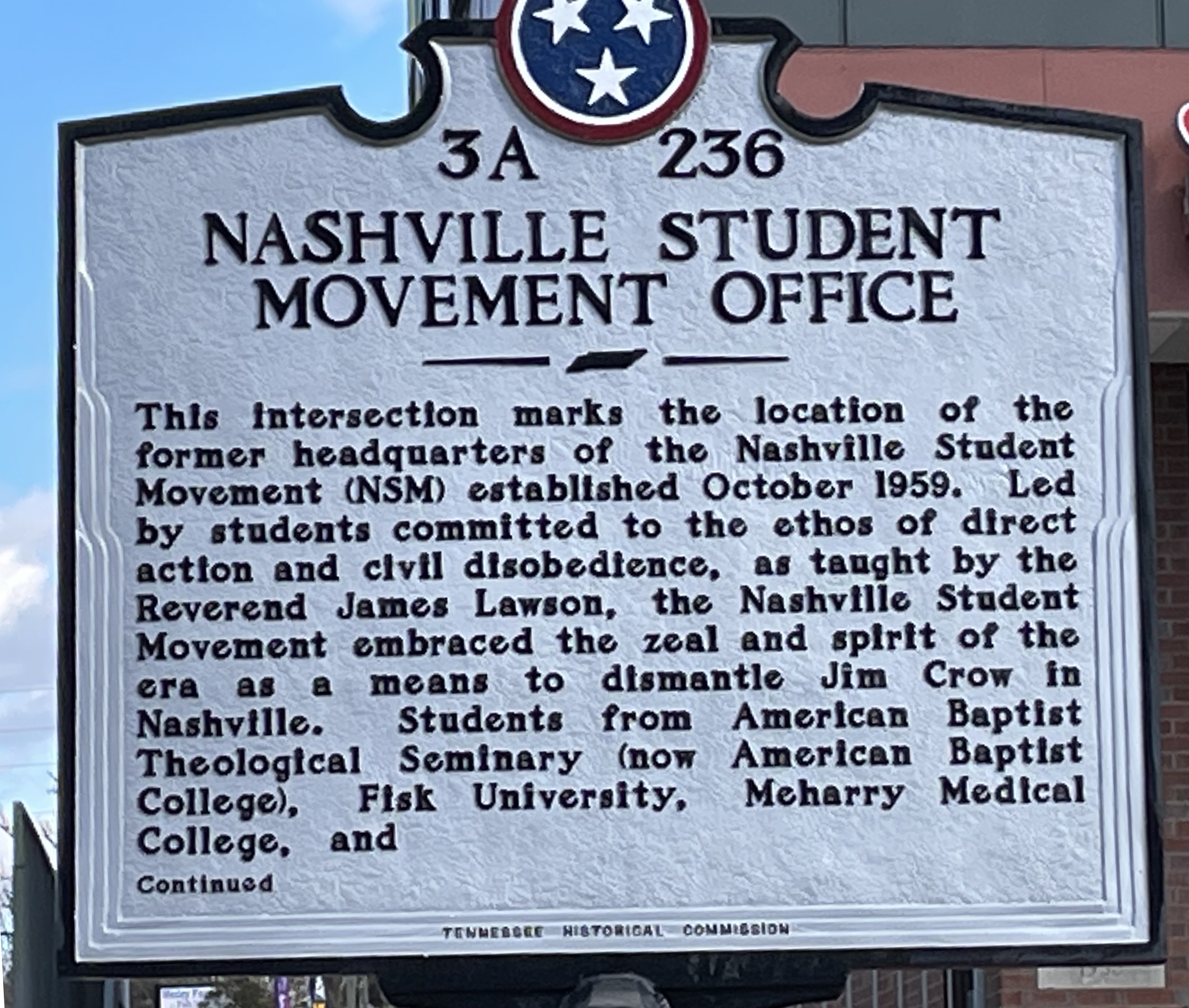
- Location of former headquarters of the Nashville Student Movement
- Abbreviation: NSM
- Founded at: Nashville, Tennessee
- Purpose: To challenge segregation in Nashville's public accommodations
- Location: Nashville, Tennessee, United States
- Methods: Nonviolence
- Leader: James Lawson
- Strategist: James Bevel and Diane Nash

The Nashville Student Movement was an organization that challenged legalized racial segregation in Nashville, Tennessee, during the Civil Rights Movement. It was created during workshops in nonviolence taught by James Lawson at the Clark Memorial United Methodist Church. The students from this organization initiated the Nashville sit-ins in 1960. They were regarded as the most disciplined and effective of the student movement participants during 1960. The Nashville Student Movement was key in establishing leadership in the Freedom Riders.

Members of the Nashville Student Movement, who went on to lead many of the activities and create and direct many of the strategies of the 1960s Civil Rights Movement, included Diane Nash, Bernard Lafayette, James Bevel, John Lewis, C. T. Vivian, Jim Zwerg, and others.

Protesters intentionally dressed 'sharp' during protests in anticipation of their arrests.

Prominent figures of the Civil Rights Movement, such as Martin Luther King Jr., recognized the brilliance of the Nashville Student Movement. King praised the individuals of this movement for their amazingly organized and highly disciplined attitudes. The Nashville Student Movement, using Gandhian methods, shone a light on the proficiency of these nonviolent methods, which ultimately allowed for the 1960s movements to have the success they had. Nonviolent methods and tactics allowed for the message to travel further and led to the Nashville Student movement becoming a pillar of success during the age of the Civil Rights Movement.

A major achievement of the Nashville Student Movement was the ending of legal segregation at lunch counters and theaters in Nashville. This helped Nashville lead the way for desegregation in the United States and acted as an example for other American cities to follow. Lawson, a vitally important member of the movement, served as an effective mentor for the younger generation, and using his knowledge of nonviolence which he gained by religious practices he helped others use pacifism as a method for ending Jim Crow laws.

== Legacy ==
The Children, a 1999 book by David Halberstam, chronicles the participants and actions of the Nashville students.

The establishment of the Nashville Student Movement was covered in John Lewis' 2013 graphic novel March: Book One and its animated series adaptation.

A marker called the "Nashville Student Movement Office" was placed at 21st Avenue North and Jefferson Street to commemorate the civil rights protests in Nashville.

Tourism officials in Nashville and Tennessee overall have made efforts to make the civil rights movement in Nashville as a historical tourist attraction. Efforts began in January 2018, and six Nashville locations were made a part of the U.S. Civil Rights Trail across various Southern states, a collection of different Civil Rights locations.

== See also ==
- Rodney N. Powell

== Bibliography ==
- Cornfield, Daniel B.; Coley, Johnathan S.; Isaac, Larry W.; Dickerson, Dennis C. (2021). " The Making of a Movement: An Intergenerational Mobilization Model of the Nonviolent Nashville Civil Rights Movement. Cambridge University Press.
  - This is a peer reviewed article published by a University press. Which summarizes the Nashville Civil Rights Movement as a whole, while touching on the nonviolent methods used in the Nashville Student Movement
- Dickerson, Dennis C. (2014). "James M. Lawson Jr.: methodism, nonviolence and the civil rights movement". United Methodist Church, General Commission on Archives & History.
  - This is a peer-reviewed article which gives background information for James Lawson. A prominent and influential figure of the Nashville Student Movement
- Summer, David E. (1995). "Nashville, nonviolence, and the newspapers: The convergence of social goals with news values". The Howard Journal of Communications.
  - This is a peer-reviewed article which gives a unique perspective to the Nashville Students Movement. Discussing the perspective of the movement for the media and newspapers, while also giving a detailed summary of the movement itself.
