= Berry Hill, Tennessee =

Berry Hill
- City
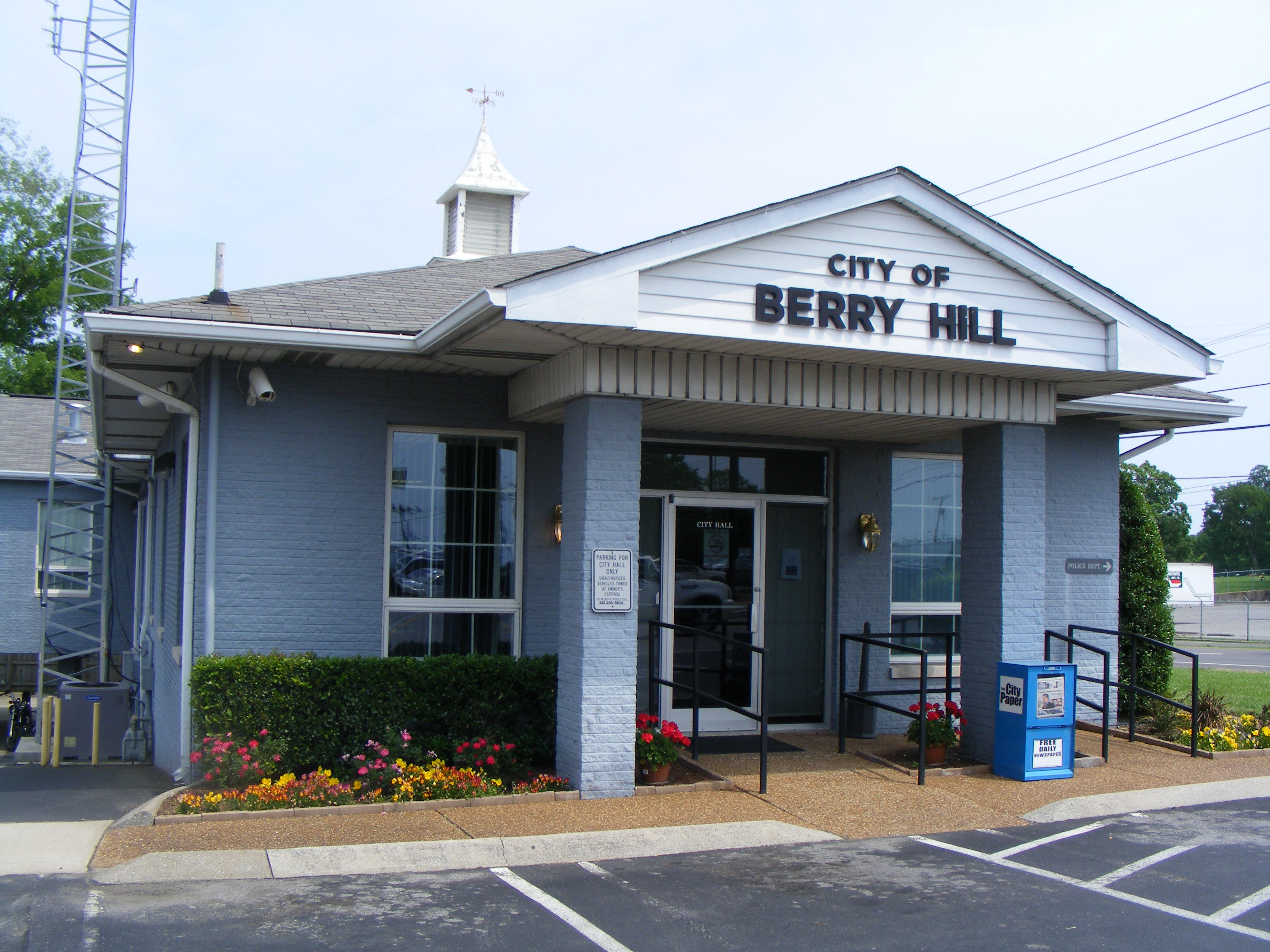
- Berry Hill's City Hall

- Location of Berry Hill in Davidson County, Tennessee.
- Coordinates: 36°07′01″N 86°45′59″W
- Country: United States
- State: Tennessee
- County: Davidson

Area
  - Total: 0.91 sq mi (2.35 km^{2})
  - Land: 0.91 sq mi (2.35 km^{2})
  - Water: 0 sq mi (0.00 km^{2})
- Elevation: 535 ft (163 m)

Population (2020)
  - Total: 2,112
  - Density: 2,331.8/sq mi (900.31/km^{2})
- Time zone: UTC-6 (Central (CST))
  - Summer (DST): UTC-5 (CDT)
- ZIP codes: 37204
- Area codes: 615/629
- FIPS code: 47-05140
- GNIS feature ID: 1277057
- Website: www.berryhilltn.gov

Berry Hill is a city in Davidson County, Tennessee. As of the 2020 census, the population was 2,112. As of 2023, the current mayor is Andrew Rusnak.

== History ==
Much of the area of Berry Hill was originally owned by William Wells Berry (1813–1876) and his descendants.

Residents of the area voted on whether to incorporate as a city on February 28, 1950. The vote was 138 to 135 favoring incorporation. Berry Hill became the first community in Davidson County to incorporate since Belle Meade incorporated in 1938. The population of Berry Hill at the time of incorporation numbered around 1,200. The city's first mayor was Ralph Rosa, who served for 22 years.

In 1963, the governments of Davidson County and the City of Nashville merged to form a consolidated metropolitan government, thereby making Berry Hill part of Metropolitan Nashville.

Beginning in 1970 when Buzz Cason purchased two houses in Berry Hill and converted them into his Creative Workshop recording studio, the area has become a center of the recording industry in Nashville, sometimes referred to as "Music Hill", as a play on the "Music Row" music recording and production hub in Nashville.

In 1991, Berry Hill became home to the Center for Gay and Lesbian Community Services. It was described as "a vital part of Nashville's gay and lesbian community" by The Tennessean in a 1993 article. Prior to 1991, the same building was home to the Tennessee Gay and Lesbian Alliance.

The area is adjacent to 100 Oaks Mall, the first enclosed shopping mall in Tennessee, the Tennessee National Guard Armory and Woodlawn Memorial Park.

== Government and politics ==
Although Berry Hill is officially part of Metro Nashville, it retains its municipal status as a city. Metro Nashville basically acts as a county government for Berry Hill and provides some of the same services to the city as it provides for the rest of the county. Berry Hill itself has a commission-manager form of government, which includes three commissioners and a city manager. The city has its own police department and public works department.

=== Political makeup ===
Berry Hill leans Democratic in statewide elections.

Berry Hill Presidential election results
Year	Democratic	Republican	Third parties
2024	60.48% 635	37.81% 397	1.71% 18
2020	67.95% 810	29.28% 349	2.77% 33
2016	63.87% 532	25.21% 210	10.92% 91

== Geography ==
According to the United States Census Bureau, the city has a total area of 0.9 square miles (2.3 km^{2}), all land.

== Demographics ==
Historical population
Census	Pop.	Note	%±
1950	1,248		—
1960	1,551		24.3%
1970	1,517		−2.2%
1980	1,113		−26.6%
1990	802		−27.9%
2000	674		−16.0%
2010	537		−20.3%
2020	2,112		293.3%

=== 2020 census ===
As of the 2020 census, Berry Hill had a population of 2,112. The median age was 28.0 years. 3.6% of residents were under the age of 18 and 2.7% of residents were 65 years of age or older. For every 100 females there were 79.3 males, and for every 100 females age 18 and over there were 79.3 males age 18 and over.

100.0% of residents lived in urban areas, while 0.0% lived in rural areas.

There were 1,446 households in Berry Hill, of which 6.1% had children under the age of 18 living in them. Of all households, 9.4% were married-couple households, 33.5% were households with a male householder and no spouse or partner present, and 47.2% were households with a female householder and no spouse or partner present. About 61.5% of all households were made up of individuals and 2.9% had someone living alone who was 65 years of age or older.

There were 1,657 housing units, of which 12.7% were vacant. The homeowner vacancy rate was 6.0% and the rental vacancy rate was 7.9%.

Racial composition as of the 2020 census
Race	Number	Percent
White	1,747	82.7%
Black or African American	115	5.4%
American Indian and Alaska Native	12	0.6%
Asian	66	3.1%
Native Hawaiian and Other Pacific Islander	0	0.0%
Some other race	33	1.6%
Two or more races	139	6.6%
Hispanic or Latino (of any race)	123	5.8%

=== 2000 census ===
At the 2000 census, there was a population of 674, with 399 households and 126 families residing in the city. The population density was 752.6 inhabitants per square mile (290.6/km^{2}). There were 442 housing units at an average density of 493.5 per square mile (190.5/km^{2}). The racial makeup of the city was 76.41% White, 16.17% African American, 0.15% Native American, 2.37% Asian, 1.93% from other races, and 2.97% from two or more races. Hispanic or Latino of any race were 3.41% of the population.

There were 399 households, of which 10.3% had children under the age of 18 living with them, 19.8% were married couples living together, 8.3% had a female householder with no husband present, and 68.4% were non-families. 58.9% of all households were made up of individuals, and 10.0% had someone living alone who was 65 years of age or older. The average household size was 1.65 and the average family size was 2.54.

The age distribution was 10.5% under the age of 18, 11.4% from 18 to 24, 39.8% from 25 to 44, 25.1% from 45 to 64, and 13.2% who were 65 years of age or older. The median age was 38 years. For every 100 females, there were 104.9 males. For every 100 females age 18 and over, there were 104.4 males.

The median household income was $30,529, and the median family income was $43,636. Males had a median income of $27,778 versus $23,500 for females. The per capita income for the city was $22,154. About 4.9% of families and 10.3% of the population were below the poverty line, including 7.7% of those under age 18 and 22.0% of those age 65 or over.

== Climate ==
The climate in this area is characterized by hot, humid summers and generally mild to cool winters. According to the Köppen Climate Classification system, Berry Hill has a humid subtropical climate, abbreviated "Cfa" on climate maps.

== Education ==
Metropolitan Nashville Public School District is the school district for all of Davidson County.
