= Harveys (department store) =

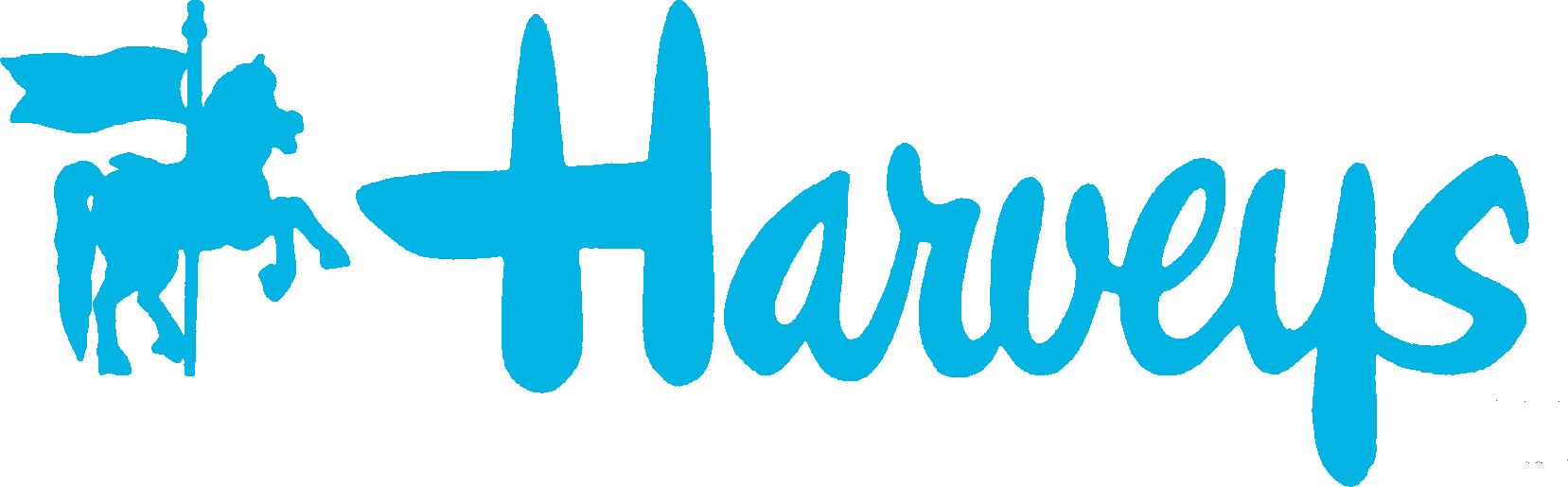
- Company type: Private
- Industry: Retail
- Founded: 1942
- Defunct: 1988
- Fate: Acquired
- Successor: Peebles
- Headquarters: Nashville, Tennessee
- Products: Clothing and housewares
- Owner: Fred Harvey (1942–1960); Fred Harvey Jr. (1960–1988)

Harveys was a department store chain best known for its original store in downtown Nashville, Tennessee.

The original Harveys department store was opened by Fred Harvey in 1942 at the corner of 6th Avenue North and Church Street in Nashville, Tennessee. The site was the former home of a post-Reconstruction Nashville retailer, Lebeck Brothers/Denton & Company, which rose to prominence in the 1870s. When the Lebeck Brothers’ property became available due to the store's closing, Fred Harvey founded Harveys department store on the property. The store expanded to eventually cover the entire block of Church Street from 6th Avenue to 5th Avenue. The store brought the first escalators to Middle Tennessee and the decor featured several carousel horses which had been salvaged from Glendale Park, a local amusement park that closed during the Great Depression. The store was also known for its lavish Christmas decorations as well as the annual Nativity scene it sponsored in Centennial Park.

In 1960, Harveys, along with several other downtown Nashville stores, was the site of sit-in demonstrations, in which local college students protested against racially segregated lunch-counters. Harveys officially desegregated its lunch-counters on May 10, 1960.

After two decades of successful growth at its downtown location, Harveys expanded to other locations. Harveys opened suburban branch stores at Madison Square Shopping Center (1962; Madison, TN) and 100 Oaks Shopping Center (1967; Nashville, TN). Stores were also opened in surrounding Middle Tennessee cities, including Clarksville, Columbia, Cookeville, and Murfreesboro, Tennessee, as well as Madisonville and Hopkinsville, Kentucky. One West Tennessee store was also opened in Dyersburg. By the 1980s, however, the popularity of suburban shopping malls led to declining sales at Harveys downtown Nashville location. The original store was closed in January 1984 and torn down to make way for a parking lot. In the late 1980s, Harveys announced another suburban Nashville store at 4724 Lebanon Road in Hermitage. Prior to the opening, the chain of stores was sold to Virginia-based Peebles in 1988.
