= Kelly Miller Smith =

American civil rights activist

- Born: October 28, 1920; Mound Bayou, Mississippi, U.S.
- Died: June 3, 1984 (aged 63)
- Resting place: Greenwood Cemetery
- Education: Morehouse College; Howard University
- Occupations: Preacher, activist
- Spouse: Alice Clark Smith
- Children: 4

Kelly Miller Smith Sr. (October 28, 1920 – June 3, 1984) was a Baptist preacher, author, and prominent activist in the Civil Rights Movement, who was based in Nashville, Tennessee.

== Early life ==
Smith was born and raised in the all-black community of Mound Bayou, Mississippi. He attended Tennessee Agricultural and Industrial State College (later Tennessee State University) from 1938 to 1940, but graduated from Morehouse College in Atlanta in 1942 with a double major in music and religion. He later received a Bachelor of Divinity degree (now known as a Master of Divinity degree) from Howard University School of Religion in 1945.

== Career ==
Smith moved to Nashville, Tennessee, in 1951 where he became pastor of First Baptist Church, Capitol Hill, a post he would retain until his death in 1984. He also served on the faculty of the American Baptist Theological Seminary. He became president of the Nashville NAACP in 1956 and founded the Nashville Christian Leadership Council (NCLC) in 1958. Through the NCLC, Smith helped to organize and support the Nashville sit-ins—a movement which would successfully end racial segregation at lunch counters in Nashville. In a 1964 interview with Robert Penn Warren for the book Who Speaks for the Negro?, Smith comments that the end to segregation was achieved through much hardship and many negotiations by the NCLC.

In 1969, Smith became assistant dean of the Vanderbilt University Divinity School. He was the first African American to become a faculty member in the school.

== Personal life and death ==
Smith was married to Alice Clark Smith and had four children, daughters Joy Ardelia, Adena Modesta, and Valerie Lin, and son Kelly Miller Smith Jr. He and his wife also reared a foster daughter Dorothy Jean Springfield.

Smith died of cancer on June 3, 1984. He was buried in Greenwood Cemetery in Nashville.

== Legacy and honors ==
- The Kelly Miller Smith Memorial Bridge and Kelly Smith Towers in Nashville are named for him.
- After his death Vanderbilt University named The Kelly Miller Smith Institute on Black Church Studies at the Divinity School in his memory. The Institute perpetuates his legacy of theological and academic excellence and prophetic witness.
- Kelly Miller Smith interviews housed in the website Who Speaks for the Negro? hosted by Robert Penn Warren Center for the Humanities at Vanderbilt University. The website is a digital archive of materials related to the book of the same name published by Robert Penn Warren in 1965. The original materials are held at the University of Kentucky and Yale University Libraries. The archive consists of digitized versions of the original reel-to-reel recordings that Warren compiled for each of his interviewees as well as print materials related to the project. Digital archive created and designed by the Robert Penn Warren Center for the Humanities at Vanderbilt University.
- The Kelly Miller Smith Papers housed at Vanderbilt Library in Special Collections, include his sermons, private correspondence, as well as Smith's musical compositions and other papers. A Finding Aid is available for this collection and the later Kelly Miller Smith Papers Addition.
- The city of Nashville (Tennessee) renamed a street Kelly Miller Smith Way (formerly 10th Circle) in memory of Kelly Miller Smith Sr. in July 2021.

The Kelly Miller Smith Center Against Abusive Behavior also bears his name. It is housed in the Ennix Jones Center on the campus of First Baptist Church, Capitol Hill in Nashville, TN. It was started by the widow of Dr. Smith, Dr. Alice Clark Risby and Dr. Ruth E. Dennis. It was started to stem the tide of domestic violence. Thus, it bears the name of this bridge builder, KMSSr.

== Selected works ==
- Microphone Messages (1947)
- A Doorway to Bible Appreciation (1948)
