= John Sloan (businessman) =

American businessman

- Born: June 28, 1904; Nashville, Tennessee, U.S.
- Died: March 15, 1988 (aged 83); Brentwood, Tennessee, U.S.
- Education: Vanderbilt University
- Occupation: Businessman
- Spouse: Margaret Howe
- Children: 4, including John Sloan Jr.

John Sloan (June 28, 1904 – March 15, 1988) was an American businessman. He served as the president of Cain-Sloan, a department store in Nashville, Tennessee, from 1937 to 1970, including during the 1960 Nashville sit-ins.

== Early life ==
Sloan was born on June 28, 1904. His father, Paul Sloan, was a co-founder of Cain-Sloan, a department store. His paternal great-grandfather, George Sloan, was a friend of President James K. Polk.

Sloan graduated from Vanderbilt University in 1925.

== Career ==
Sloan began his career as a salesman at Cain-Sloan. He climbed through the ranks and became vice president from 1933 to 1937 and president of Cain Sloan Co when he was 30. The company merged with Dillard's in 1987. He served as a director of First American National Bank, Tennessee Electric Power, Co. and the NC & St.L Railroad, Blue Cross Blue Shield of Tennessee, and the National Dry Goods Association. He served as president of the Nashville Area Chamber of Commerce during 1943-1944, President of Vanderbilt Alumni Association 1943-1946, Life Member of the Vanderbilt University Board of Trust, President of the Boys Club of Nashville, Commissioner of Williamson County Court continually from 198? to his death. He was President of Montgomery Bell Academy Board of Trust for 27 years.

As president of Cain-Sloan during the 1960 Nashville sit-ins, Sloan argued that desegregation would be detrimental to the private sector. He also conspired with James G. Stahlman to expel the leader of the sit-ins, James Lawson, from his alma mater, Vanderbilt University, on whose board of trust both men served.

== Personal life and death ==
John Elliott Sloan was the son of Paul Lowe Sloan born in 1870. His great grandfather Vaniah Sloan was born in Nashville in 1842. Vaniah was the son of George Leverett Sloan born in Hartford, Connecticut in 1806. He moved to Nashville with his brother Fred sometime around 1868, when Nashville had a population of 25,000. During the Civil War he was a Union sympathizer. He was shot when ambushed out riding for his sympathies with the Union. His son Paul Lowe Sloan married Anne Joy. In 1903 Paul Sloan established Cain-Sloan Co. His oldest son George (1894–1955) Married Florence Lincoln Rockefeller of New York and was elected President of the Metropolitan Opera Board. He was a Director of U.S.Steel, Goodyear Tires 7 Rubber, Bankers Trust of New York and Seagram's. John Sloan's other siblings were Paul Sloan, Jr., Jeannette Sloan Warner, Katherine Sloan Thomas, and Elizabeth Sloan Bainum.

John Sloan was the third son of Paul and Anne Sloan. He married Margaret Howe. They had four sons, John Sloan, Jr. (1936–1993), the president and CEO of the National Federation of Independent Business, George A. Sloan, who in 1977–1978 was the first American and non-Briton to win the prestigious Amateur Championship in England, Thomas Sloan, and Paul L. Sloan III. John and Margaret Sloan resided at Maple Grove, a farm in Brentwood, Tennessee. Sloan was a co-founder of the Iroquois Steeplechase, Master of the Hounds of the Hillsboro Hunt and a member of the Belle Meade Country Club.

John Sloan was instrumental in the development of Brentwood, Tennessee.

Sloan died on March 15, 1988, in Brentwood.
