= Avon Williams =

American politician (1921–1994)

Avon N. Williams, Jr. (December 22, 1921 – August 29, 1994) was a Tennessee State Senator from 1972 to 1992.

== Biography ==
Avon Nyanza Williams, Jr. was born in Knoxville, Tennessee. He was a 1940 graduate of Johnson C. Smith University, an historically black university located in Charlotte, North Carolina. He subsequently studied law at the Boston University School of Law and was admitted to the Tennessee and Massachusetts bars in 1948. He practiced law in Knoxville from 1949 to 1953, then he moved to Nashville. In 1956, he married Joan Bontemps, the daughter of Fisk University Librarian and author, Arna Bontemps The couple had two children, Avon Williams III and Wendy Janette Williams.

Williams' first cousin, Thurgood Marshall, was the chief lawyer for the Legal Defense and Educational Fund of the NAACP. In Nashville, Williams was an active member of the NAACP, long serving on its executive board, and active as a civil rights attorney and a key figure in the Nashville-area Civil Rights Movement. Through these efforts he met Z. Alexander Looby, a fellow African American lawyer focused on civil rights. He joined Looby's practice and together they helped defend African Americans participating in the movement.

Additionally, he was an active alumnus of the Omega Psi Phi fraternity and served as a Reserve lieutenant colonel in the United States Army Judge Advocate General's Corps. He also was an instructor in "dental jurisprudence" in the dental department of Nashville's Meharry Medical College, one of the few historically black medical schools. Williams was extremely active in school desegregation, long serving as a plaintiff's counsel in Nashville's long-running (40 year plus) school desegregation lawsuit which resulted in forced busing, making him extremely unpopular with elements of Nashville's white community and even the subject of death threats by white supremacists.

In 1955, Williams and Looby filed suit against the Nashville school system. Kelley v. Board of Education of Nashville followed the Brown v. Board of Education ruling and pushed for school desegregation. The case highlighted the busing controversy and lasted for thirty years.

In 1960, Williams other civil rights lawyers represented the students arrested for the Nashville sit-ins, an event he discussed in relation to other civil rights issues in a 1964 interview with Robert Penn Warren for the book Who Speaks for the Negro?

In 1967 Williams represented the I-40 Steering Committee in their legal battle to stop Interstate 40 from dissecting North Nashville (Jefferson Street). The lawsuit was filed against Governor Ellington, Commissioner Speight, and Mayor Briley of Nashville.

In 1969 Williams was elected as a Democrat to the Tennessee State Senate from a newly configured district centering on the historically black section of North Nashville. He was the first African American senator elected in the state of Tennessee. From this base, he became highly influential in the Nashville black community. He acted in pursuit of the liberal Democratic agenda of the era in general and the civil rights agenda in particular. As a high-profile African American legislator, both criticism and praise were common.

In the 1970s Williams won a significant legal victory that allowed the merging of the University of Tennessee-Nashville with the historically black Tennessee State University (TSU). This expedited the process of integration in the state's system of higher education.

In the late 1980s Williams began to be debilitated by the progressive effects of ALS ("Lou Gehrig's disease") and began to require the services of a chauffeur/attendant. Speculation was rife that he would not seek another Senate term in 1988; however he did so and was easily re-elected. However, this was to prove to be his final term, as he came to realize that he was no longer capable of the physical rigors that Senate service occasionally entailed and did not seek another term in 1992. He died shortly thereafter, in 1994. In honor of his unfailing devotion to the Civil Rights cause, the downtown campus of Tennessee State University (formerly the University of Tennessee at Nashville) has been named for him.

Williams' son Avon N. Williams III, was an attorney like his father, but unlike him a Republican. Avon Williams III died suddenly on July 9, 2005.
