= Cain-Sloan =

US department store chain

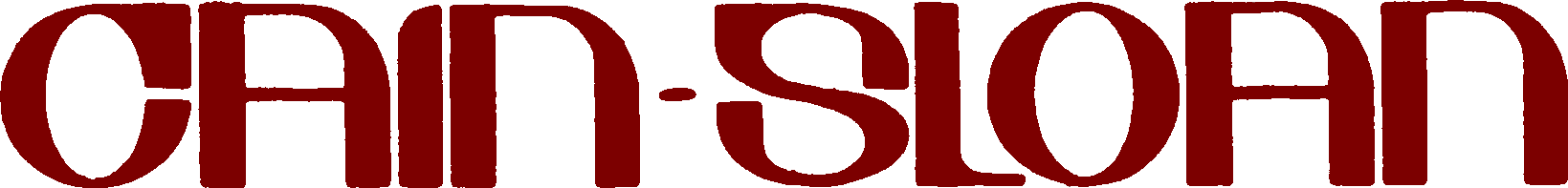
- Industry: Retail
- Founded: 1903
- Founder: Paul Lowe Sloan; Pat Cain; John E. Cain
- Headquarters: Nashville, Tennessee, U.S.
- Area served: United States
- Key people: John Sloan

Cain-Sloan Co. Inc. was a department store chain based in Nashville, Tennessee, United States. It was founded in 1903, merged with Allied Stores in 1955, and with Dillard's in 1987. It was a target of the 1960 Nashville sit-ins.

== History ==
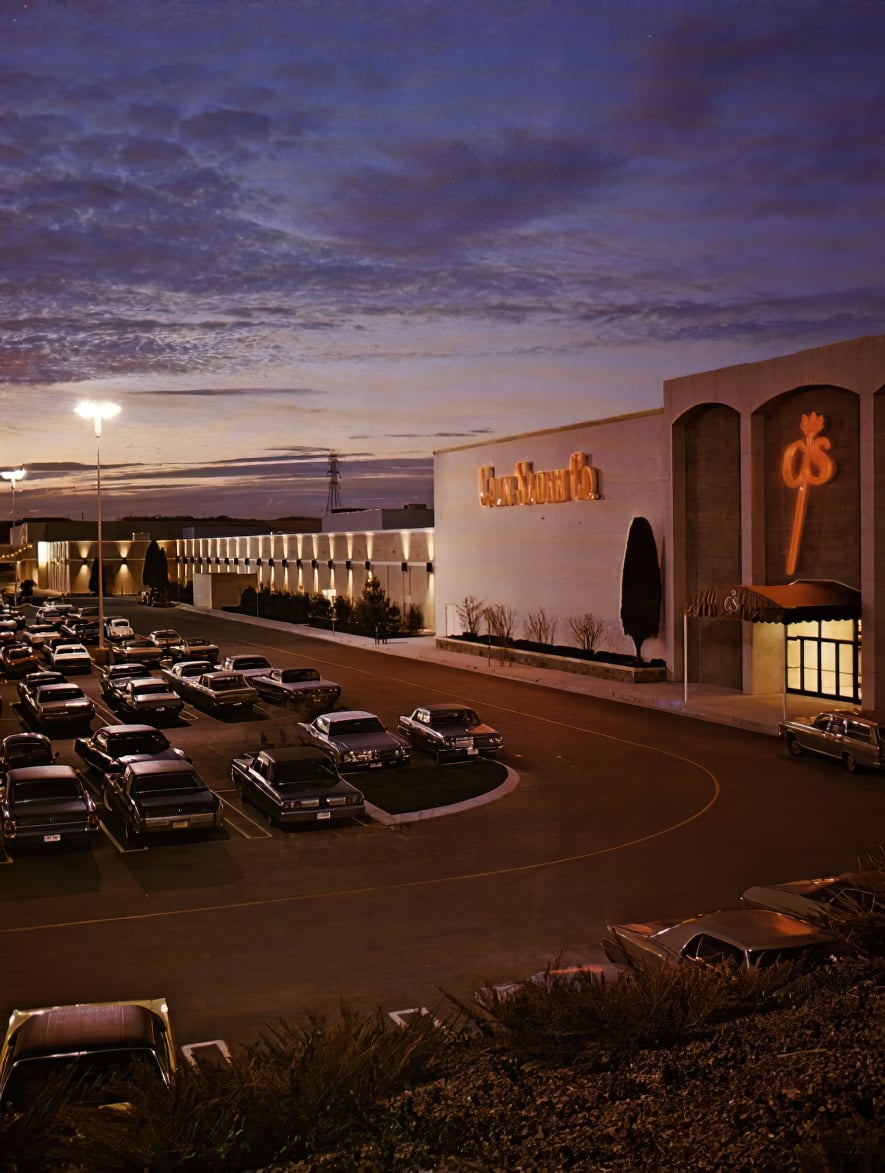
Cain-Sloan's Rivergate Mall location in 1971

The store was co-founded by Paul Lowe Sloan, Pat Cain and John E. Cain in Nashville in 1903. The company merged with Allied Stores Corp. of New York in 1955 and remained under its umbrella before being sold to, and renamed, Dillard's in 1987–1988.

The chain had four locations: Downtown Nashville, Hickory Hollow Mall, Rivergate Mall, and The Mall at Green Hills.

== Civil Rights Movement ==
Cain-Sloan was a target of one of the earliest sit-in protests by young African-Americans in Nashville during the Civil Rights Movement. On December 5, 1959, future Congressman John Lewis led a group of college students who entered the store intending to sit at its lunch counter. They were politely asked to leave, and they did so. After the march on Nashville's courthouse in April 1960 and the admission by Mayor Ben West that lunch counters "ought to be desegregated", Cain-Sloan and other downtown Nashville stores quietly opened their counters to all races as of May 10, 1960.

== Conversion to Dillard's ==
In 1987, shortly before Allied Stores merged with Campeau Corporation, the four Cain-Sloan stores were sold to Dillard's in a separate deal. Dillard's entered Nashville as it took over operations of the three mall stores, but closed the downtown store instead of converting it. In 1991, Dillard's replaced the former Cain-Sloan with a new building at Hickory Hollow Mall as part of a mall expansion.

Following the conversion, Dillard's continued expanding in the Nashville market by building two new stores (Bellevue Center and Cool Springs Galleria). In August 1998, Dillard's acquired Mercantile Stores, the parent company of Nashville-based Castner Knott. Dillard's retained three Castner Knott stores (Donelson Plaza, Harding Mall, and Murfreesboro's Stones River Mall) and quickly sold select locations to Proffitt's. Dillard's has since closed the Stones River, Harding Mall, Donelson Plaza, Bellevue Center and Hickory Hollow Mall locations, leaving Rivergate, CoolSprings, and Green Hills as the only Dillard's stores left in the Nashville Metro as of 2026. Bellevue Center was the first of the converted locations to close, doing so in late 2007. The Hickory Hollow store would shutter in August 2008, leaving Rivergate and Green Hills as the only converted Dillard's left.
