= James Lawson (activist) =

American activist (1928–2024)

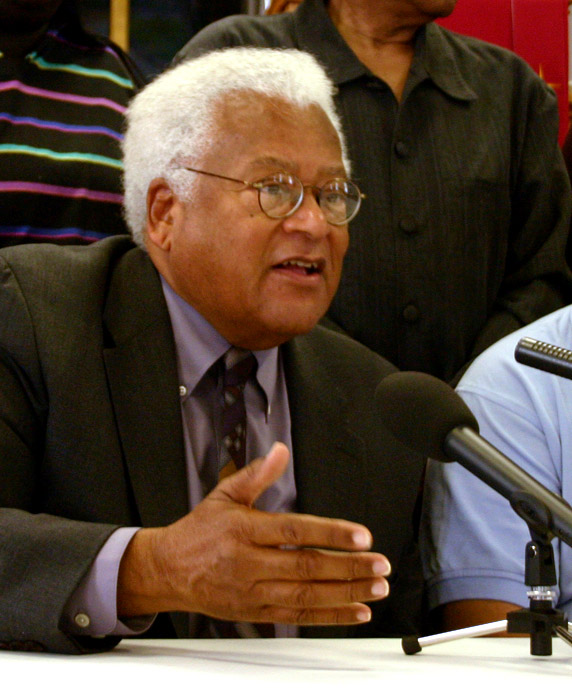
- Lawson in 2005
- Born: James Morris Lawson Jr. September 22, 1928; Uniontown, Pennsylvania, U.S.
- Died: June 9, 2024 (aged 95); Los Angeles, California, U.S.
- Education: Baldwin Wallace University (BA); Oberlin College; Vanderbilt University; Boston University (STB)
- Occupations: Activist, professor, minister
- Known for: Nashville sit-ins

James Morris Lawson Jr. (September 22, 1928 – June 9, 2024) was an American activist and university professor. He was a leading theoretician and tactician of nonviolence within the Civil Rights Movement. During the 1960s, he served as a mentor to the Nashville Student Movement and the Student Nonviolent Coordinating Committee. He was expelled from Vanderbilt University for his civil rights activism in 1960, and later served as a pastor in Los Angeles for 25 years.

== Early life and education ==
Lawson was born to Philane May Cover and James Morris Lawson Sr. on September 22, 1928, in Uniontown, Pennsylvania. He was the sixth out of nine children. He grew up in Massillon, Ohio. Both Lawson's father and grandfather were Methodist ministers. Lawson received his ministry license in 1947 during his senior year of high school.

While a freshman at Baldwin Wallace College in Berea, Ohio, he studied sociology. Because of his refusal to serve in the US military when drafted, he was convicted of draft evasion and sentenced to two years in prison. He served 13 months of his sentence and returned to college, finishing his degree. He joined the Fellowship of Reconciliation (FOR), an organization led by A. J. Muste, and the Congress of Racial Equality (CORE), an organization affiliated with FOR. Both FOR and CORE advocated nonviolent resistance to racism.

He went as a Methodist missionary to Nagpur, India, where he studied satyagraha, a form of nonviolence resistance developed by Mohandas Gandhi and his followers. He returned to the United States in 1956, entering the Graduate School of Theology at Oberlin College in Ohio. One of his Oberlin professors introduced him to Martin Luther King Jr. who had also embraced Gandhi's principles of nonviolent resistance. In 1957, King urged Lawson to move to the south telling him, "Come now. We don't have anyone like you down there." He moved to Nashville, where he attended Vanderbilt University and began teaching nonviolent protest techniques.

Lawson studied at Oberlin College from 1956 to 1957 and after being there for a year, he married Dorothy Wood and had three sons. He attended Vanderbilt from 1958 to 1960. Lawson was expelled from Vanderbilt in March 1960 for civil rights arrests, but received his S.T.B. from Boston University that same year. Lawson received a post as pastor of the Scott Church in Shelbyville, Tennessee.

== Leadership during the Civil Rights Movement ==
External videos
- "Interview with James M. Lawson, Jr." conducted in 1985 for the Eyes on the Prize documentary in which he discusses the Nashville sit-ins.

Lawson moved to Nashville, Tennessee, and enrolled at the Divinity School of Vanderbilt University, where he served as the southern director for CORE and began conducting nonviolence training workshops for the Southern Christian Leadership Conference in a church basement in 1958. While in Nashville, he met and mentored a number of young students at Vanderbilt, Fisk University, and other area schools in the tactics of nonviolent direct action. In Nashville, he trained many of the future leaders of the Civil Rights Movement, among them Diane Nash, James Bevel, Bernard Lafayette, Marion Barry, and John Lewis. In 1959 and 1960, they and other Lawson-trained activists launched the Nashville sit-ins to challenge segregation in downtown stores. In February 1960, following the lunch sit-ins by students at the Woolworth's stores in Greensboro, North Carolina, Lawson and several others were arrested. Their actions led to desegregation of some lunch counters.

Lawson was expelled from Vanderbilt due to his participation in these activities. James Geddes Stahlman, the publisher of the Nashville Banner who served on the university's board of trust, published misleading stories that led to his expulsion. Another trustee, John Sloan, the president of Cain-Sloan, supported Stahlman's suggestion to expel him. Under the intense pressure, Chancellor Harvie Branscomb enforced the decision. Branscomb later re-examined that action, regretting he did not consider referring the matter to a committee to delay action for three months until Lawson's graduation. During the 2006 graduation ceremony, Vanderbilt apologized for its treatment of Lawson. Lawson returned to teach at Vanderbilt as a Distinguished Professor from 2006 to 2009. He donated his papers in 2013.

Lawson's students played a leading role in the Open Theater Movement, the Freedom Rides, the March on Washington, Freedom Summer, the Mississippi Freedom Democratic Party, the Children's Crusade in Birmingham, the 1965 Selma Voting Rights Movement, the Chicago Freedom Movement, and the Anti-Vietnam War Movement over the next few years. In 1962, Lawson brought King and Bevel together for a meeting that resulted in the two agreeing to work together as equals. Bevel was then named SCLC's Director of Direct Action and Director of Nonviolent Education.

In 1961, Lawson helped develop strategy for the Freedom Riders. Lawson encouraged the students to plan a second wave of Freedom Rides from Alabama to continue the work and Lawson joined the group. They arrived in Jackson safe, but when they filed into a "whites only" waiting room they were arrested. Lawson was among the first who was arrested during the Jackson Freedom Ride arrests. The NAACP offered to pay for bail, but Lawson and others refused bail and waited for trial. The judge found all 27 guilty and they remained in jail. Lawson and the Freedom Riders met with Attorney General Robert F. Kennedy, and, in September 1961, President John F. Kennedy ordered that passengers be able to sit anywhere.

"And I want to commend the preachers, under the leadership of these noble men: James Lawson, one who has been in this struggle for many years; he's been to jail for struggling; he's been kicked out of Vanderbilt University for this struggle, but he's still going on, fighting for the rights of his people."

— Martin Luther King Jr., 1968

Lawson became pastor of Centenary Methodist Church in Memphis, Tennessee in 1962. In 1968, when black sanitation workers began the Memphis sanitation strike for higher wages and union recognition after two of their co-workers were accidentally crushed to death, Reverend Lawson served as chairman of their strike committee. He co-founded the Committee on the Move to Equality (COME). Lawson extended an invitation to Dr. King to speak in Memphis. King delivered his famous "I've Been to the Mountaintop" speech, and was killed in Memphis in April 1968.

== Later career ==
Lawson moved to Los Angeles in 1974, where he was pastor of Holman United Methodist Church. He retired in 1999, but continued his civil rights work. While in Los Angeles, he was active in the labor movement, the American Civil Liberties Union, and movements for reproductive choice and gay rights. He served as chairman of the Laity United for Economic Justice. During this time, Lawson hosted Lawson Live, a weekly call-in radio show, where he discussed human- and social-rights issues. He continued to train activists in nonviolence and supports immigrants' rights in the United States, the rights of Palestinians, and workers' rights to a living wage.

Lawson took part in a well-publicized three-day Freedom Ride commemorative program sponsored by Vanderbilt University's Office of Active Citizenship and Service in January 2007. The program included an educational bus tour to Montgomery and Birmingham, Alabama. Participants also included fellow Civil Rights activists Jim Zwerg, Diane Nash, Bernard Lafayette, C. T. Vivian and John Seigenthaler; journalists and approximately 180 students, faculty and administrators from Vanderbilt, Fisk, Tennessee State University and American Baptist College.

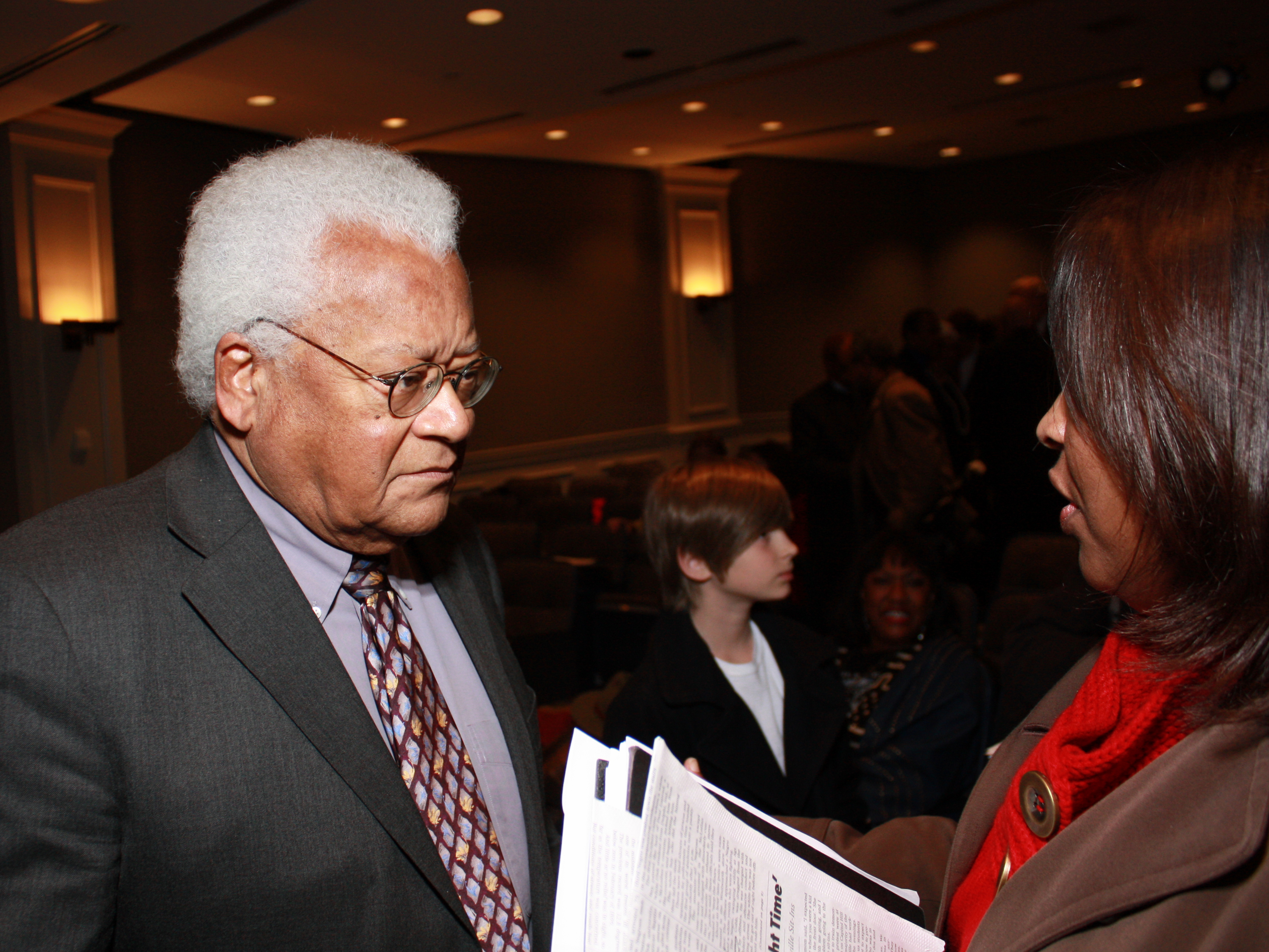
Lawson in 2010 talking with an audience member following a panel discussion on the Nashville sit-ins

He spearheaded California State University Northridge's (CSUN) Civil Discourse and Social Change initiative as a visiting faculty member for the academic year of 2010/11, where he continued to serve as a visiting scholar teaching a semester-long course on nonviolence until his death in 2024. The initiative built on CSUN's history of activism and diversity, while focusing on the current budget and policy battles surrounding education. Lawson helped bring perspective, knowledge, and strategic thinking to the campus.

The International Center on Nonviolent Conflict held an eight-day program on civil resistance facilitated by Lawson in Nashville in 2013 and 2014. A class taught by Lawson, Kent Wong, Kelly Lytle Hernandez, and Ana Luz Gonzalez inspired UCLA students to publish Wong, Kent; González, Ana Luz; Lawson, James M. (2016). Nonviolence and Social Movements. Center for Labor Research and Education, University of California, Los Angeles. ISBN 978-0-9836289-6-5., a book that focuses on the principles of nonviolence and social change that Lawson taught.

== Death ==
Lawson died at a hospital in Los Angeles, on June 9, 2024, at the age of 95. This was the night before the 60th anniversary of the Civil Rights Act of 1964's filibuster breaking.

== Honors ==
In 2004, he received the Community of Christ International Peace Award. On December 10, 2021, UCLA announced the renaming of the UCLA Labor Center building next to MacArthur Park as the UCLA James M. Lawson Jr. Labor Center, in honor of his longstanding commitment to the advancement of worker rights and the wellbeing of laborers.

On April 24, 2019, as a result of nomination by council member Nick Fish, the Portland Oregon mayor and city council declared that day the Reverend James Lawson Jr. Day in a ceremony at City Hall. That night Rev. Lawson delivered the keynote address to the public at Portland State University, beginning five days of the 6th James Lawson Institute, organized by peace scholar and former SNCC Communications Co-director (with Julian Bond) Mary E. King.

On July 28, 2023, James Lawson High School opened in Nashville, Tennessee. A one-mile stretch (1.6 km) of Adams Boulevard near Holman United Methodist Church was renamed in his honor in 2024.

== In media ==
Lawson was portrayed in the 2013 motion picture The Butler by actor Jesse Williams. The film chronicles Lawson's training sessions during the civil rights protests of the 1950s and 1960s. Lawson was the subject of the film Love and Solidarity: Rev. James Lawson and Nonviolence in the Search for Workers Rights by Michael K. Honey. The film is an introduction to Lawson's contributions to labor rights struggles and the civil rights movement.

== See also ==
- Timeline of the civil rights movement
- List of civil rights leaders
- Stanley Hallett
