= Robert Emmitt Lillard =

American civil rights activist (1907–1991)

- Born: March 23, 1907; Trimble Springs Bottom, South Nashville, Tennessee, U.S.
- Died: November 6, 1991 (aged 84); Nashville, Tennessee, U.S.
- Occupation: Lawyer · Judge · Politician · Civil rights activist
- Years active: 1936–1978
- Known for: First African American circuit court judge in Davidson County

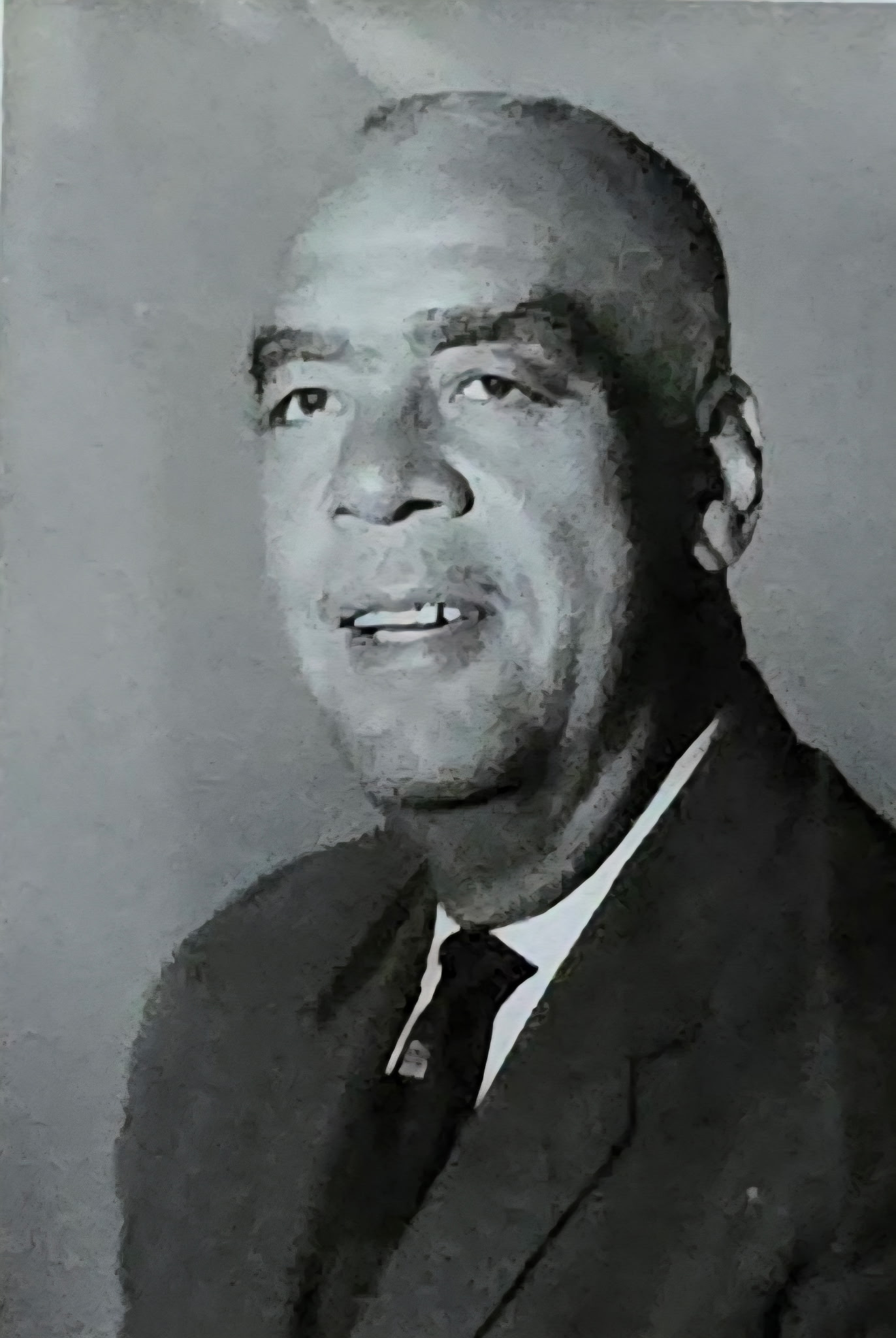

Robert Emmitt Lillard (March 23, 1907 – November 6, 1991) was an American civil rights activist, lawyer, judge, and politician from Nashville, Tennessee. He served on the Nashville City Council and Metropolitan Council (1951–1971), organized voter registration drives, aided the Nashville sit-in movement, and in 1978 became the first African American 1st circuit court judge in Davidson County.

== Early life and education ==
Robert E. Lillard was born in the Trimble Springs Bottom neighborhood of South Nashville to John W. Lillard and Virginia Allen Lillard. He attended Immaculate Mother’s Academy and Nashville public schools, then Beggins Commercial College. While working as a city garage attendant, he enrolled part-time in Kent College of Law in 1932, graduated with an LL.B. in 1935, and passed the Tennessee bar exam in 1936.

== Legal career ==
After admission to the bar, Lillard practiced part-time law while serving as a fireman at Fire Engine Company No. 11 (1936–1950). Following a disability pension in 1950, he opened a full-time law practice. He was admitted to practice before the U.S. District Court for the Middle District of Tennessee (1955), the Sixth Circuit of the U.S. Court of Appeals (1957), and the Supreme Court of the United States (1962). He defended civil rights protesters arrested during the 1960 Nashville sit-ins and worked with lawyers such as Z. Alexander Looby. In March 1978, Governor Ray Blanton appointed him judge of the First Circuit Court, Tenth Judicial District, making him the first Black circuit court judge in Davidson County; he retired from the bench on August 31, 1978.

== Political career ==
In 1932, Lillard formed the Fifteenth Ward Colored Voters and Civic Club to enfranchise Black voters by subsidizing poll taxes. In 1951, he was elected to the Nashville City Council from the Third District, Second Ward, winning a runoff against the white incumbent. He served continuously on the City Council (1951–1963) and the Metropolitan Council (1963–1971), chaired multiple committees, and championed causes such as converting Cameron Junior High to a Black high school and desegregating the Parthenon. In 1967, he became the first Black vice-mayor pro tem. He co-founded the Tennessee Federation of Democratic Leagues and campaigned for John F. Kennedy in 1960. Lillard opposed city-county consolidation in 1962 but continued to serve until 1971.

== Civil rights activism ==
Beyond elected office, Lillard was instrumental in voter registration, founding the Fifteenth Ward Civic Club and subsidizing poll taxes. He supported the 1960 sit-ins by forming the Sit-In Legal Defense Committee and defending arrested students. He aided Z. Alexander Looby after white supremacists bombed Looby’s home. Lillard opposed legislation enabling private segregated academies and advocated for school and public facility integration. He was a member of the NAACP and collaborated with labor organizations to advance Black employment opportunities.

== Professional and civic engagement ==
Lillard co-founded the James C. Napier Lawyers Association (later Napier-Looby Bar Association) and was the only two-term president of the National Bar Association (1961–1963). He belonged to the Nashville, Tennessee, and American Bar Associations; the American Judicature Society; Omega Psi Phi; the Elks; Prince Hall Masons; and the AFL–CIO. He served as divisional chairman for United Way, March of Dimes, and American Red Cross, and sat on boards of the Boy Scouts, Nashville Boys Club, Century Club, Historic Landmarks Association, Legal Services, Inc., and the Mid-Cumberland Council of Governments.

== Personal life and death ==
Lillard married Hallie C. Moore in 1928 and helped raise her daughter, Gladys, as his own. After Moore’s passing, he married Leona Kittrell and helped raise her daughter, Evelyn. They had two children: Sandra A. Lillard Glatt and Robert W. Lillard. Known affectionately as "Bob," he was widely respected for his mentoring, integrity, and resonant bass voice. He died on November 6, 1991, in Nashville. His funeral was held at Seay-Hubbard United Methodist Church, and he was laid to rest at Greenwood Cemetery.

== Legacy and honors ==
Lillard’s former home and law office at 1062 2nd Avenue South is marked by a Metro Historical Commission plaque (erected 2023). In 2002, U.S. Highway 41 (Lafayette Street) in Nashville was designated the Robert E. Lillard Memorial Highway. Metro schools renamed Kings Lane Elementary as Robert E. Lillard Elementary Design Center (2004). His mentorship influenced jurists like A. A. Birch Jr., and his papers are preserved by the Tennessee Historical Society and Nashville Public Library.
