= Diane Nash =

American civil rights activist

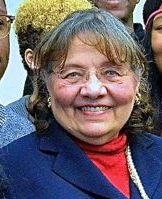
- Nash, 2014.
- Born: Diane Judith Nash; May 15, 1938 (age 88); Chicago, Illinois, U.S.
- Education: Howard University; Fisk University (BA)
- Occupations: Activist; strategist
- Organization: SNCC
- Television: Eyes on the Prize; A Force More Powerful; Freedom Riders
- Movement: Civil Rights Movement
- Spouse: James Bevel (m. 1961; div. 1968)
- Children: 2
- Awards: Presidential Medal of Freedom (2022); Freedom Award; Rosa Parks Award

Diane Judith Nash (born May 15, 1938) is an American civil rights activist and strategist of the student wing of the Civil Rights Movement. Nash's campaigns were among the most successful of the era. Her efforts included becoming the chairman of the Nashville Student Movement; organizing the Nashville sit-ins, the first successful civil rights campaign to integrate lunch counters; continuing the Freedom Rides, which desegregated interstate travel; co-founding the Student Nonviolent Coordinating Committee (SNCC); and co-initiated the Alabama Voting Rights Project and working on the Selma Voting Rights Movement with her husband, James Bevel.

Their Selma campaign helped gain Congressional passage of the Voting Rights Act of 1965, which authorized the federal government to oversee and enforce state practices to ensure that African Americans and other minorities were not prevented from registering and voting. In July 2022, Nash was awarded the Presidential Medal of Freedom by President Joe Biden.

== Biography ==
=== Early life ===
Nash was born in May 1938 and raised Catholic in a middle-class African-American family in Chicago. Her father, Leon Nash, was a veteran of World War II. Her mother, Dorothy Bolton Nash, worked as a keypunch operator during the war, leaving Diane in the care of her grandmother, Carrie Bolton, until age seven. Carrie Bolton was a cultured woman, known for her refinement and manners. After the war, Nash's parents' marriage ended. Dorothy married again to John Baker, a waiter on the railroad dining cars owned by the Pullman Company. Baker was a member of the Brotherhood of Sleeping Car Porters, one of the most powerful black unions in the nation.

As Dorothy no longer worked outside the house, Diane saw less of her grandmother Carrie Bolton. Nonetheless, Bolton continued to be an important influence on Nash's life and was committed to making sure Diane understood her value. Bolton didn't discuss race often, believing that racial prejudice was taught to younger generations by their elders. Her grandmother's words and actions instilled in Diane confidence and a strong sense of self-worth. Simultaneously, her grandmother's influence cultivated a sheltered environment that left her vulnerable to the severity of racism in the outside world.

=== Education ===
Nash attended Catholic schools, and at one point considered becoming a nun. She also was the runner-up in a regional beauty pageant leading to the competition for Miss Illinois. After graduating from Hyde Park Academy High School in Chicago, Nash went to Washington, D.C., to attend Howard University, a historically black college (HBCU). After a year, she transferred to Fisk University in Nashville, Tennessee, where she majored in English. Nash acknowledged that she looked forward to personal growth during her time in college and wanted to explore the challenging issues of the time.

In Nashville, she was first exposed to the full force of Jim Crow laws and customs and their effect on the lives of Blacks. Nash recounted her experience at the Tennessee State Fair when she had to use the "Colored Women" restroom, signifying the first time she had ever seen and been impacted by segregation signage. Outraged by the realities of segregation, Nash began to show signs of leadership and soon became a full-time activist.

Nash's family members were shocked when she joined the Civil Rights Movement. Her grandmother was quoted as saying, "Diane, you've gotten in with the wrong bunch"; she did not know that Diane was the chairwoman of organizing the nonviolent protests at her university. Her family was not familiar with the idea of working for civil rights, and it took her family time to fully recognize her position as a key player in the Civil Rights Movement. Her mother soon become a supporter by fundraising for the Freedom Riders. Nash said in a PBS Tavis Smiley interview, "My mother ended up going to fundraisers [in Chicago that sent money to] students in the South and, [she even went] to an elevated train bus station one day at 6:00 a.m. to hand out leaflets protesting the war." Her mother was influenced by Nash's sense of empowerment.

=== Nashville Student Movement ===
At Fisk, Nash searched for a way to challenge segregation. Nash began attending nonviolent civil disobedience workshops led by James Lawson. While in India, James Lawson had studied Mahatma Gandhi's techniques of nonviolent direct action and passive resistance used in his political movement. By the end of her first semester at Fisk, Nash had become one of Lawson's most devoted disciples. Although originally a reluctant participant in nonviolence, Nash emerged as a leader due to her well-spoken, composed manner when speaking to the authorities and to the press. In 1960 at age 22, she became the leader of the Nashville sit-ins, which lasted from February to May. Lawson's workshops included simulations in order to prepare the students to handle verbal and physical harassment that they would ultimately face during the sit-ins. In preparation, the students would venture out to segregated stores and restaurants, doing nothing more than speaking with the manager when they were refused service. Lawson graded their interactions in each simulation and sit-in, reminding them to have love and compassion for their harassers. This movement was unique for the time in that it was led by and composed primarily of college students and young people. The Nashville sit-ins spread to 69 cities across the United States.

Though protests would continue in Nashville and across the South, Nash and three other students were first successfully served at the Post House Restaurant on March 17, 1960. Students continued the sit-ins at segregated lunch counters for months, accepting arrest in line with nonviolent principles. Nash, with John Lewis, led the protesters in a policy of refusing to pay bail. In February 1961, Nash served jail time in solidarity with the "Rock Hill Nine" — nine students imprisoned after a lunch counter sit-in. They were all sentenced to pay a $50 fine for sitting at a whites-only lunch counter. Chosen as spokesperson, Nash said to the judge, "We feel that if we pay these fines we would be contributing to and supporting the injustice and immoral practices that have been performed in the arrest and conviction of the defendants." When Nash asked Nashville's mayor, Ben West, on the steps of City Hall, "Do you feel it is wrong to discriminate against a person solely on the basis of their race or color?", the mayor admitted that he did. Three weeks later, the lunch counters of Nashville were serving blacks. Reflecting on this event, Nash said, "I have a lot of respect for the way he responded. He didn't have to respond the way he did. He said that he felt it was wrong for citizens of Nashville to be discriminated against at the lunch counters solely on the basis of the color of their skin. That was the turning point. That day was very important." In August 1961, Nash participated in a picket line to protest a local supermarket's refusal to hire blacks. When local white youths started egging the picket line and punching various people, police intervened. They arrested 15 people, only five of whom were the white attackers. All but one of the blacks who were jailed accepted the $5 bail and were freed. But Nash stayed. The 23-year-old activist had insisted on her arrest with the other blacks, and once in jail, refused bail.

=== SNCC and SCLC ===
In spring 1960, nearly two hundred students involved with the nationwide sit-in movement arrived in Raleigh, North Carolina, for an organizing conference. There, the SCLC (Southern Christian Leadership Conference), at Ella Baker's request, sponsored the students' meeting on April 15. Martin Luther King envisioned a simple SCLC student league, but Baker herself advised the youth to remain autonomous and follow their own principles. Accordingly, in April 1960 Nash was one of the leading founders of the Student Nonviolent Coordinating Committee (SNCC - pronounced "snick"), independent of any adult organizations, and quit school to lead its direct action wing. In the coming years, organizations such as the Congress of Racial Equality (CORE) and SCLC would try to recruit SNCC as their own student wing, with SNCC always resisting the invitations. The Student Nonviolent Coordinating Committee would go on to be involved with some of the most important campaigns of the civil rights era, adding a fresh and active youth voice to the movement. In early 1961, Nash and ten fellow students were put under arrest in Rock Hill, South Carolina, for protesting segregation. Once jailed, they would not accept the chance for bail. These dramatic events began to bring light to the fight for racial justice that was beginning to emerge. It also highlighted the idea of "jail, no bail", which was utilized by many other civil rights activists as the fight for rights progressed. Originally fearful of jail, Nash was arrested dozens of times for her activities. She spent 30 days in a South Carolina jail after protesting segregation in Rock Hill, in February 1961. In 1962, although she was four months pregnant with her daughter Sherri, she faced a two-year prison sentence in Mississippi for contributing to the delinquency of minors whom she had encouraged to become Freedom Riders and ride on the buses. Despite her pregnancy, she was ready to serve her time with the possibility of her daughter's being born in jail. Nash took the weight of this possibility seriously, spending two days praying and meditating before coming to a decision and penning an open letter. "I believe that if I go to jail now, it may help hasten that day when my child and all children will be free — not only on the day of their birth but for all their lives." She was sentenced to 10 days in jail in Jackson, Mississippi, "where she spent her time there washing her only set of clothing in the sink during the day and listening to cockroaches skitter overhead at night". Nash would go on to serve many roles for the SCLC from 1961 through 1965 while it was under Martin Luther King Jr. Though years later, Nash is clear about how she saw herself in relation to King, stating, "I never considered Dr. King my leader. I always considered myself at his side and I considered him at my side. I was going to do what the spirit told me to do. So If I had a leader, that was my leader." She later cut ties with the SCLC, questioning their leadership structure, including their male- and clergy-dominated ranks. She would also split from SNCC in 1965 when their directives changed under Stokley Carmichael's leadership, taking particular issue with the organization's departure from the founding pillar of nonviolence.

=== Freedom Riders ===
"We will not stop. There is only one outcome," stated Nash, referring to the 1961 CORE Freedom Riders. Designed to challenge state segregation of interstate buses and facilities, the project was suspended by CORE after a bus was firebombed and several riders were severely injured in attacks by a mob in Birmingham, Alabama. Nash called on Fisk University and other college students to fill buses to keep the Freedom Rides going. They traveled to the South to challenge the states. The Nashville students, encouraged by Nash, promptly decided to finish the trip that had been suspended at Birmingham. New Orleans Congress of Racial Equality, the Nashville students and Nash were committed, ready, and willing. "It was clear to me that if we allowed the Freedom Ride to stop at that point, just after so much violence had been inflicted, the message would have been sent that all you have to do to stop a nonviolent campaign is inflict massive violence," says Nash. Nash took over responsibility for the Freedom Rides and worked to recruit Riders, act as media spokesperson, and garner the support the government and other Movement leaders. Coordinating from Nashville, she led the Freedom Riders from Birmingham, Alabama to Jackson, Mississippi, where CORE Field Secretary Tom Gaither coordinated a massive program on the ground.

After the severe attacks, CORE's Executive Director James Farmer Jr., a veteran of CORE's original 1947 Freedom Rides, was hesitant to continue them. Nash talked with the students of the Nashville Student Movement and argued that, "We can't let them stop us with violence. If we do, the movement is dead." Nash remained adamant that they not send a message to the public that civil rights efforts could be stopped with violence. As the violence escalated and bus drivers began to refuse service to the Riders due to the dangers, Attorney General Robert Kennedy became involved and worked to keep the Rides going. Kennedy called the Alabama governor and the Greyhound bus company to implore them to allow the Rides to continue. Kennedy insisted that his special assistant John Seigenthaler travel to Alabama to get directly involved in the matter. Seigenthaler informed the reluctant Alabama governor that it was the government's duty to protect these citizens during the Freedom Rides. Nash spoke with Seigenthaler on the phone, and Seigenthaler warned her that the Freedom Rides could result in death and violence for participants. She responded, "We know someone will be killed, but we cannot let violence overcome nonviolence." Nash explained to Seigenthaler that she and other students had already signed their wills. John Lewis, who had just returned from the Freedom Ride, agreed to continue it, as did other students. A contingent of activists from New Orleans CORE also participated. They continued the action to a successful conclusion six months later.

When Nash was bringing a batch of students to Birmingham to continue the Ride, she telephoned Birmingham activist Fred Shuttlesworth to inform him. He responded to her sternly: "Young lady, do you know that the Freedom Riders were almost killed here?" Nash assured him that she did and that that would not stop her from continuing the ride. After gathering the final list of Riders, she placed a phone call to Shuttlesworth. They knew their phone line had been tapped by local police, so they worked out a set of coded messages related to, of all things, poultry. For instance, "roosters" were substituted for male Freedom Riders, "hens" for female Riders and so on. When Nash called Shuttlesworth again on Wednesday morning to tell him "The chickens are boxed," he knew that the Freedom Riders were on their way. On May 20, 1961, the Riders left Birmingham for Montgomery with the promise of protection from the federal government, including police escorts and planes flying overhead. After about 40 miles, all signs of protection disappeared, and the Riders were subjected to a violent, angry mob armed with makeshift weapons such as pipes and bricks. Both white and black Riders were injured by the mob, including special assistant John Seigenthaler who exited his car to help one of the female Riders who was being beaten. When all the other Riders had left the bus terminal, five of the female Riders phoned Shuttlesworth, who relayed their whereabouts to Nash. Others called Nash directly, to inform her of the chaotic situation that had occurred. Fearing that all the riders were subject to arrest, Nash advised them to stay out of sight from the police, but this was compromised by Wilbur and Hermann, who had called the police after fleeing from the terminal area.

On May 21, 1961, Martin Luther King Jr. arrived at the First Baptist Church in Montgomery, Alabama. King had caused tension between himself and the Freedom Riders, Nash included, due to his refusal to participate in the Rides. Nash was present at the First Baptist Church that night and is credited with playing a key role in getting King to come and speak in support of the Freedom Riders. More than 1,500 citizens were trapped inside the church overnight as violence raged outside. Martial law had to be declared by Alabama Governor John Patterson to finally bring an end to the mob. Gov. Patterson had been highly criticized by many within the movement for his unwillingness to support and protect the Riders. This was the first time he and the state of Alabama had moved to protect the movement. King preached to the crowd inside the church while teargas seeped in from outside, telling them that they would "remain calm" and "continue to stand up for what we know is right." In 1963, President John F. Kennedy appointed Nash to a national committee to promote civil rights legislation. Eventually his proposed bill was passed as the Civil Rights Act of 1964.

=== Alabama Project and the Selma Voting Rights Movement ===
Shocked by the 1963 church bombing in Birmingham that killed four young girls, Nash and James Bevel committed to raising a nonviolent army in Alabama. Their goal was the vote for every black adult in Alabama, a radical proposition at the time. Alabama and other southern states had effectively excluded blacks from the political system since disenfranchising them at the turn of the century. After the funerals for the girls in Birmingham, Nash confronted SCLC leadership with their proposal. She was rebuffed, but continued to advocate this "revolutionary" nonviolent blueprint.

Together with the SCLC, Nash and Bevel, who was in charge of SCLC's Selma Voting Rights Movement, organized the Selma to Montgomery marches, a series of protests for voting rights in Alabama that took place in early 1965. Marchers crossed the Pettus Bridge on their way to the state capital of Montgomery, but after they left the city limits, they were attacked by county police and Alabama state troopers armed with clubs and tear gas, determined to break up the peaceful march. John Lewis, who had knelt to pray, had his skull fractured. The images were broadcast over national television, shocking the nation.

Soon after this incident, President Lyndon Johnson publicly announced that it was "wrong--deadly wrong--to deny any of your fellow Americans the right to vote in this country." The initiative culminated in passage by Congress of the 1965 Voting Rights Act, which authorized the federal government to oversee and enforce the constitutional right to vote, with mechanisms to assess state compliance and require changes to enable registration and voting. In 1965, SCLC gave its highest award, the Rosa Parks Award, to Nash and James Bevel for their leadership in initiating and organizing the Alabama Project and the Selma Voting Rights Movement.

=== Later recognition ===
During the civil rights era and shortly after, many of the male leaders received most of the recognition for its successes. As the civil rights era has been studied by historians, Nash's contributions have been more fully recognized. In 1995, historian David Halberstam described Nash as "…bright, focused, utterly fearless, with an unerring instinct for the correct tactical move at each increment of the crisis; as a leader, her instincts had been flawless, and she was the kind of person who pushed those around her to be at their best, or be gone from the movement."

External videos
- "Interview with Diane Nash" conducted in 1985 for the Eyes on the Prize documentary in which she discusses her participation in both the Nashville sit-in campaign and the Freedom Rides.

Nash is featured in the award-winning documentary film series Eyes on the Prize (1987) and the 2000 series A Force More Powerful about the history of nonviolent conflict. She is also featured in the PBS American Experience documentary on the Freedom Riders, based on the history of the same name. Nash is also credited with her work in David Halberstam's book about the Nashville Student Movement, The Children, as well as Lisa Mullins' book Diane Nash: The Fire of the Civil Rights Movement. In addition, she has received the Distinguished American Award from the John F. Kennedy Library and Foundation (2003), the LBJ Award for Leadership in Civil Rights from the Lyndon Baines Johnson Library and Museum (2004), Nash has continued to believe in the power of nonviolent action to solve conflicts. In an interview with Theresa Anderson she said

Violence needs to be addressed. I think the Civil Rights Movement has demonstrated how to resolve human conflicts. I think it's crazy when two countries have problems with each other and one says 'Let's bomb them, kill them, go fight.' If we have a problem with another country I would like to see consideration instead of an automatic tendency to go to war. Let's hear their side, consider our side, and look at what is logical and reasonable. Let's look at what serves the best interests of the people and see if we can negotiate solutions, more sane solutions.

In December 2021, the Metropolitan Council of Nashville and Davidson County voted to name the landing in front of the courthouse, where marchers led by Nash confronted Mayor West regarding segregated downtown lunch counters, the Diane Nash Plaza. An earlier effort to name the park in front of the courthouse for her failed because rules prevented Nashville parks from being named for living people.

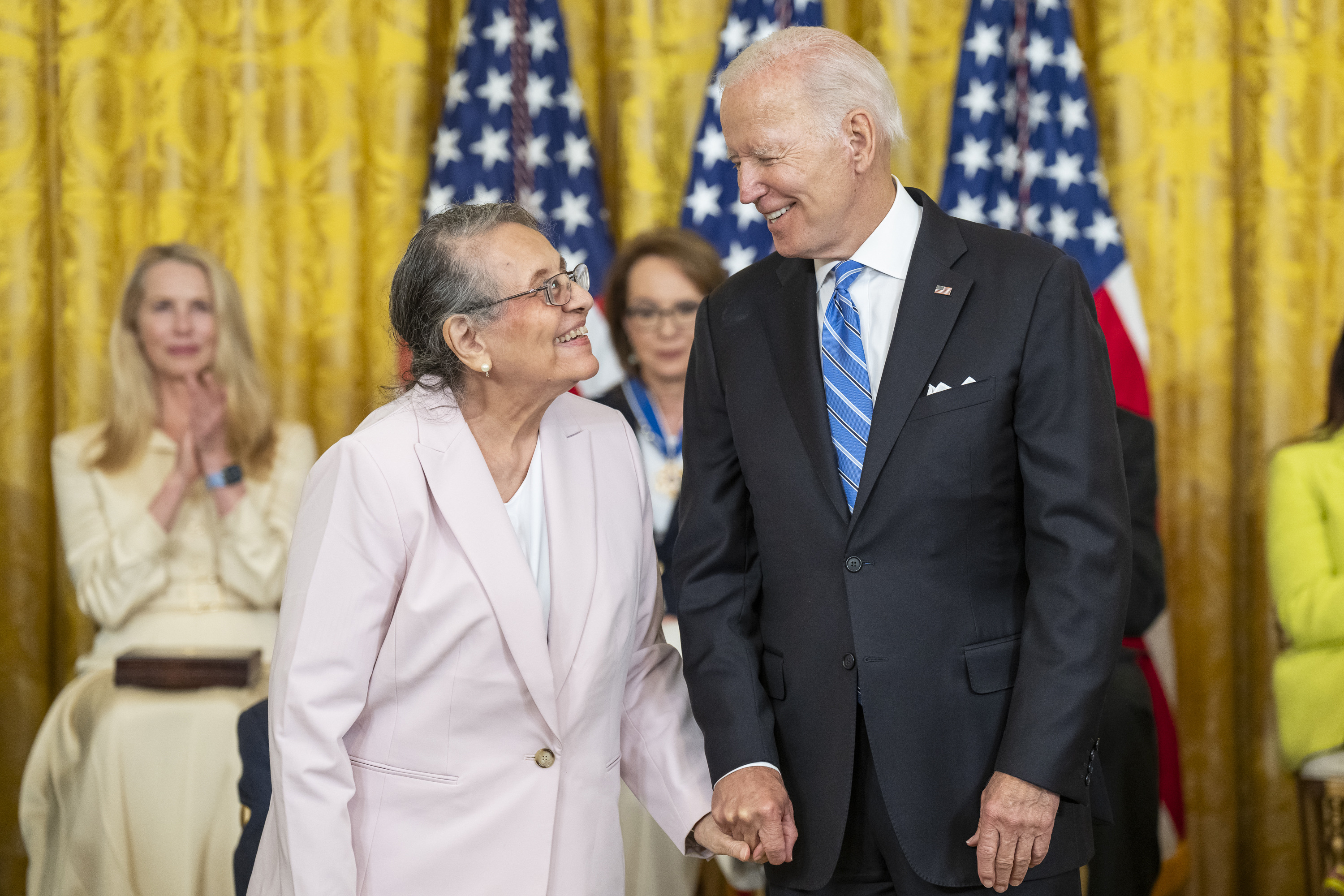
Nash awarded the Presidential Medal of Freedom by President Joe Biden, July 2022.

On July 1, 2022, the White House announced that Nash would be awarded the Presidential Medal of Freedom.

=== Later life ===
After the Civil Rights Movement, Nash moved back to Chicago, where she worked in the fields of education and real estate, continuing as an advocate and championing causes such as fair housing and antiwar efforts. She still lives in Chicago, only a few miles away from her son Douglass Bevel, with whom she remains very close. In 2013, Nash expressed her support for Barack Obama, while also sharing her misgivings about his continuing involvement in the wars in Iraq and Afghanistan. While encouraged by the positive implications associated with electing the first Black president of the United States, Nash still believes that the true changes in American society will come from its citizens, not government officials. Although she attended the Selma 50th anniversary celebrations in March 2015, Nash was noticeably absent from the restaging of the 1965 Selma march. When asked about her refusal to participate in the historic event, Nash cited the attendance of former president George W. Bush. Nash, who has dedicated her life to pursuits of peace and nonviolence, declared that Bush "stands for just the opposite: For violence and war and stolen elections, and his administration…had people tortured." Decades after she played a critical role in the Civil Rights Movement, Nash remains committed to the principles of nonviolence that have guided her throughout her life. Although she was a key architect in many of the Movement's most successful efforts, she remains humble upon reflection. "It took many thousands of people to make the changes that we made, people whose names we'll never know. They'll never get credit for the sacrifices they've made, but I remember them." In July 2022, Joe Biden presented Nash with the Presidential Medal of Freedom.

== Personal life ==
Nash first met fellow protester James Bevel while they were preparing to participate in the Nashville sit-ins. Nash and Bevel were married in 1961. The couple had two children together, a son and a daughter. They divorced in 1968, after seven years of marriage; Nash never remarried.

== In popular culture ==
Nash is portrayed by Tessa Thompson in the 2014 film Selma. Nash is also portrayed in the 2014 The Boondocks episode "Freedom Ride or Die".

== See also ==
- List of civil rights leaders
