= Harding Mall =

Coordinates: 36.081817°N 86.725329°W

- Location: Nashville, Tennessee, U.S.
- Address: 4050 Nolensville Road
- Opened: 1966
- Closed: 2005
- Developer: Harding Mall Corp.
- Num. of stores: 50+
- Num. of anchor tenants: 3
- Floor area: 232,500 square feet (21,600 m^{2})
- Floors: 1

Harding Mall was a shopping mall located in suburban Nashville, Tennessee, United States. It was southeast of downtown at the corner of Nolensville Pike US 31A/US 41A and Harding Place (SR 255) in the Paragon Mills neighborhood. Built in 1966, it was demolished in 2005 for a Walmart. Harding Mall is notable for being the first enclosed shopping mall in the state of Tennessee.

== History ==
The mall was announced as early as January 1962, as a 200,000 sq ft, $2.5 million venture. Plans originally called for the center to be built with an innovative design with no doors, featuring only "invisible walls of controlled air to keep weather out", and for the center to be finished by August 1963. Ground was broken on the site for the now $6 million mall in April 1963, in a ceremony where mayor Beverly Briley broke ground with a silver-plated shovel. Others in attendance were Robert C Hilton, president of Castner Knott, Raymond C Sanders, president of Harding Mall Associates and Harding Mall Corp., and Andrew Benedict, president of First American National Bank. By this point a large number of tenants had been confirmed, including anchor Castner Knott, and junior anchors Walgreens, G. C. Murphy, F. W. Woolworth, and A&P. The A&P supermarket opened on August 18, 1965 and First American National Bank opened on October 1, 1965, followed by anchor Castner Knott on March 14, 1966. The single-screen Capri Theatre, operated by Martin Theatres, opened March 26, 1969.

An expansion to Castner Knott began in 1973, and was completed by late 1974. A Service Merchandise "annex" opened in the former G. C. Murphy store in mid 1980, said to focus on toys and sporting goods in order to complement a larger Service Merchandise showroom elsewhere in Nashville. Marshalls opened on May 5, 1983, in the former Service Merchandise space, which had been previously downgraded to a surplus store. The Capri Twin Theatres came under the management of Carmike Cinemas in 1982 with their acquisition of Martin Theatres, and was demolished and replaced by a 6-screen Carmike Cinemas during the 1988 renovation. The 1988 renovation was announced in December, and was enacted by new owners David E Miller and Robert R Brown who had purchased the mall for $9.85 million earlier that month. Plans called to renovate the existing 264,000 sq ft and adding an additional 90,000 sq ft. The plans also included construction of a freestanding strip center on the property, and several restaurants.

The new 6-screen Carmike Cinemas opened in May 1990, followed by the mall itself whose renovation was completed in fall that year. Castner Knott converted to Dillard's in 1998, with their acquisition of parent company Mercantile Stores Company, Inc. earlier that year. Carmike Cinemas, since downgraded to a discount theater, closed on August 24, 2000, along with Murfreesboro, Tennessee's Stone River 6 theater. The mall closed at the end of March 2005, with plans for a Walmart Supercenter on the site announced by June. Demolition began on July 5, 2005, and the new Walmart Supercenter opened on January 19, 2007. Despite the mall's demolition, the area is still referred to as the Harding Mall area in advertising.
