= Ben West =

American politician (1911-1974)

62nd Mayor of Nashville
- In office 1951–1963
- Preceded by: Thomas L. Cummings, Sr.
- Succeeded by: Beverly Briley (1st Mayor of Metropolitan Nashville)

29th President of the National League of Cities
- In office 1957
- Preceded by: Robert F. Wagner Jr.
- Succeeded by: George Christopher

Member of the Tennessee Senate
- In office 1949–1951

Vice Mayor of Nashville
- In office 1946–1949

Personal details
- Born: Raphael Benjamin West; 31 March 1911 Columbia, Tennessee, U.S.
- Died: 20 November 1974 (aged 63) Nashville, Tennessee, U.S.
- Resting place: Nashville City Cemetery
- Party: Democratic
- Spouse: Mary Humes Meadors
- Children: Ben West Jr. (son); Jay West (son)
- Education: Cumberland Law School, Vanderbilt University

Raphael Benjamin West (March 31, 1911 – November 20, 1974) was an American attorney and politician who served as mayor of Nashville from 1951 to 1963, and as a Tennessee state senator from 1949 to 1951. While a state senator, he supported a change from at-large to single-member district voting to the Nashville City Council. This broadened representation on the council, enabling the African-American minority to elect candidates of their choice, and women also gained seats on the council.

== Early life and education ==
West was born in 1911 in Columbia, the county seat of Maury County, Tennessee; he was the son of Martha Melissa (née Wilson) and her husband James Watt West. He moved to Nashville as a boy with his family. When he was three years old, his parents moved to a working-class neighborhood in Flat Rock, now known as the Woodbine district of Davidson County. Working his way through college, West attended Vanderbilt University and Cumberland Law School.

== Career ==
In 1934 West began work as an assistant district attorney in Nashville. He also became active in politics, joining the Democratic Party. The state had effectively disenfranchised most blacks since the turn of the century. This hollowed out the Republican Party in much of the state. Many elections, both local and state, were settled in the Democratic primaries, the true competitive contests.

=== State senate ===
In 1943, West ran unsuccessfully for mayor of Nashville. Three years later, in 1946, he won election as vice-mayor of Nashville.

In 1948, he was elected as state senator in the Tennessee Senate, serving one term to 1949. In the Senate, West introduced legislation that restored single-member district elections for the Nashville city council, replacing the citywide at-large election of each seat. This represented a major opportunity for African-American voters, as it enabled minorities whose votes were concentrated in a few wards to elect candidates of their choice. In the at-large elections, candidates supported by a minority had not been able to gain a majority and win election.

In addition to being a voting rights reform, this change proved important to West's political future. He would build a political base on the reemerging black voter. State repeal of such voter registration restrictions as the poll tax enabled voters to exercise their constitutional rights again. As highways were built and white voters moved to the suburbs in the postwar years, African-American voters gained more political power in the city.

=== Mayor of Nashville ===
In 1951 West won election as mayor of Nashville, along with the first two African-American councilmen in 40 years. All three men were attorneys. As mayor of Nashville, West supported other voting rights reforms, particularly a state campaign to reapportion rural and urban voting districts in the state legislature to reflect demographic changes. West championed the cause of reapportionment in the landmark case Baker v. Carr (1962), by which the U.S. Supreme Court ruled in favor of the "one man, one vote" principle. This ruling forced reapportionment of state legislatures across the country; as a result, there was a shift of political power to the more densely populated urban districts and cities.

West provided leadership in the desegregation of Nashville public schools. After a school was bombed, he and the Board of Education obtained a federal court injunction to help protect the schools, students and parents.

While mayor of Nashville, West was concerned about urban issues and civil rights. He served as president of the American Municipal Association (now the National League of Cities). He presided over the Capitol Hill Redevelopment Project. This replaced a slum and vice district surrounding the state capitol building with a green belt, new state office buildings, and parking lots. The East Nashville Urban Renewal Project began during his administration, and infrastructure projects were completed for an $11 million sewage treatment plant and $2 million in street lighting. West's strong alliance with Nashville's black community helped improve race relations and prepare the city for the challenges of the activist years of the Civil Rights Movement.

At a critical moment during the sit-in demonstrations of 1960, following the bombing of the home of Z. Alexander Looby, city councilman and defense attorney for the students, 2500 protesters marched to city hall and challenged West to take a stand against segregation. West appointed a biracial commission, and the Nashville business community quickly agreed to desegregate department store lunch counters. Nashville was the first southern city to desegregate public facilities.

With an interest in improving services, West supported the consolidation of the city government with that of Davidson County proposed in 1958 and 1963. After the measure passed a referendum, West ran to become mayor of the new Metropolitan government in 1963, but finished third behind Davidson County Assessor Clifford Allen and Davidson County Judge Beverly Briley. He ran again in 1966, losing to Briley.

West retired to private life. He died in Nashville on November 20, 1974. He is buried in Nashville City Cemetery.

Political offices
Preceded by Thomas L. Cummings, Sr.	Mayor of Nashville, Tennessee; 1951—1963	Succeeded by Beverly Briley
