= Hickory Hollow Mall =

Shopping mall in Tennessee, United States

- Location: Antioch, Nashville, Tennessee
- Coordinates: 36.051111°N 86.654722°W
- Address: 5252 Hickory Hollow Parkway
- Opened: September 21, 1978; 48 years ago
- Closed: April 2019; 7 years ago
- Developer: Homart Development Company
- Owner: Global Mall at the Crossings LLC
- Num. of stores: Over 100
- Num. of anchor tenants: 4 (at peak)
- Floors: 2
- Parking: Parking lot

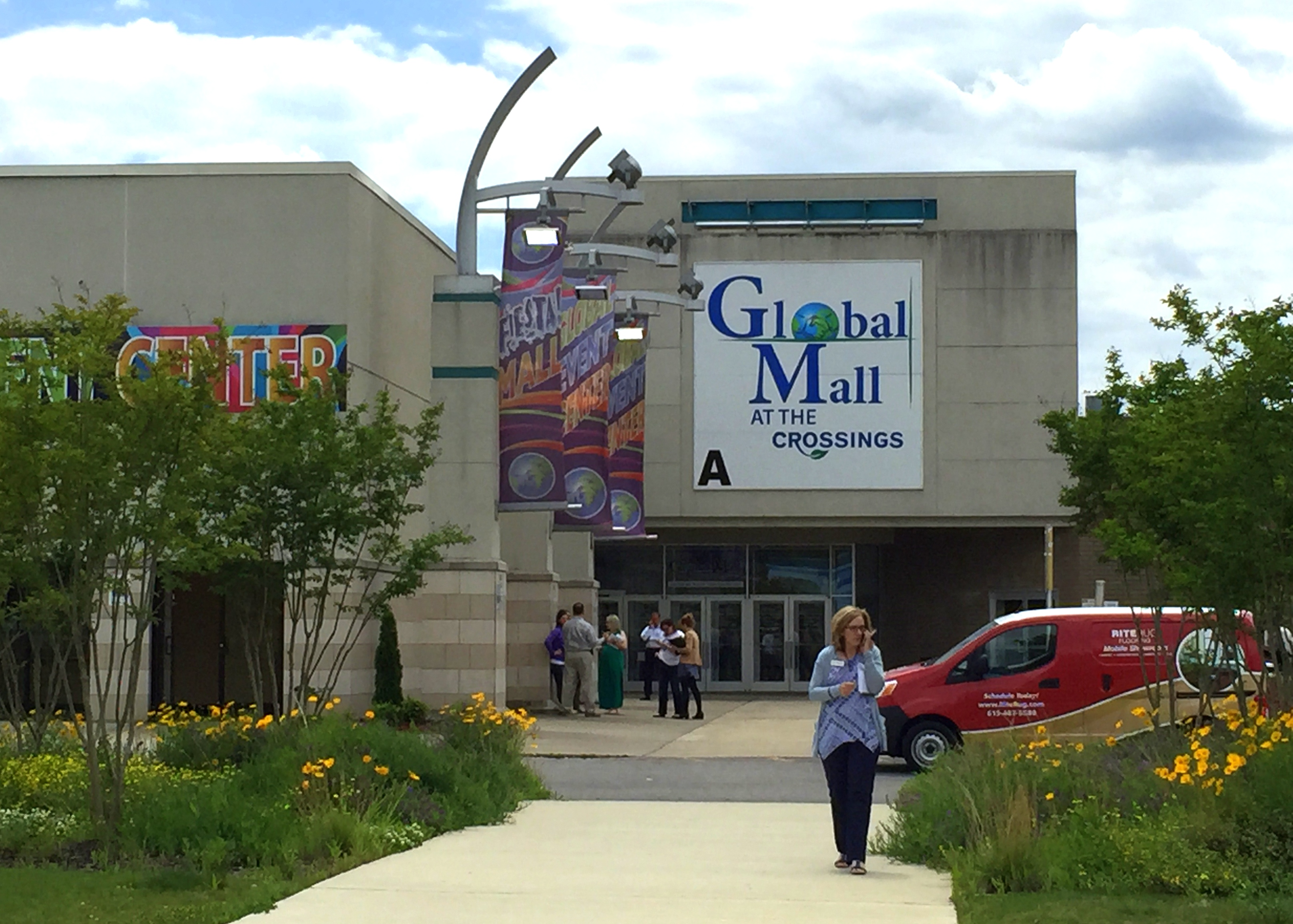
Upper north entrance of Global Mall at the Crossings, Antioch, Tennessee.

Hickory Hollow Mall, later Global Mall at the Crossings, was a 1,100,000 ft^{2} (100,000 m^{2}) regional indoor shopping mall in the Nashville neighborhood of Antioch, Tennessee, located just east of I-24 at exit 59 along Bell Road (Route 254). The shopping center was inaugurated on August 11, 1978, and flourished for three decades, containing 249 stores during its heyday as the largest and highest-grossing mall in Tennessee.

Many factors led to its decline during the late 2000s, plummeting to a mere 12 retailers by the year 2012, earning its status as a dead mall. Between 2012 and 2016, over $50 million was invested in revitalizing the Hickory Hollow property and 58 tenants occupied the internationally-themed mall (47.8% occupancy) by 2016. After 41 years of operation, the mall closed in 2019 and is scheduled for demolition in 2026.

== History ==
Antioch was a small rural community of farmers in the 1960s. A massive population influx in the 1970s was fueled by the construction of numerous apartment complexes after the sewer system was extended to the outskirts of Nashville.

Hickory Hollow Mall opened on September 21, 1978, on 27 acres of land in Nashville's burgeoning southeastern neighborhood amidst the explosive growth. It was Middle Tennessee's fifth mall, its second super regional mall, and one of Tennessee's first two-tiered indoor shopping centers. For its first three years, it was the largest retail space in the state of Tennessee, surpassing Goodlettsville's Rivergate Mall, which opened in 1971. The mall's structure featured three wings in a T-shaped layout connected by a large two-story atrium hub, containing a total of 137 tenants, including an arcade and a movie theater. On opening night, Mall Cinemas 1–2–3 operated by Consolidated Theatres screened first-run movies starting with Animal House, Grease, and Hooper.

Local department store, Cain-Sloan, opened on August 9, two days prior to the mall's inauguration, and was situated on the south side of the central hub (as the south wing did not yet exist). Two other department stores served as the original anchor tenants, including national franchise Sears in the west wing, and locally founded Castner Knott in the east wing. Big-name retailers occupying the 617,000 sq ft (57,300 m^{2}) inner core of the building included national chains B. Dalton Booksellers, The Gap, Kay Jewelers, Thom McAn, and Hallmark Cards. Original tenants also included locally based Kirkland's, The Tennessee Coffee Company, and the initial location of Angelo's Picnic Pizza.

Natural light was abundant through the atrium-style glass ceiling and steel latticework and the mall's center court included a glass elevator and a water feature. The Food Garden, a food court located in the west wing, was designed with multi-level seating and landscaped vegetation with eateries that included locally based The Cookie Store, as well as Swensen's Ice Cream Factory, Tater Junction, and the first Chick-fil-A in Tennessee; one of the first expansions of this franchise outside of Georgia and The Carolinas. The premises contained 5,795 parking spaces. At some point the main office obtained the phone number (615) 731-MALL.

On October 7, 1981, the Mall of Memphis opened in West Tennessee with 885,627 sq ft (82,277.4 m^{2}) of retail space, surpassing Hickory Hollow in retail square footage but not in overall structural size. On August 5, 1987, the $180 million facility Hamilton Place opened in Chattanooga with an overall size of 1,170,712 sq ft (108,762.7 m^{2}), surpassing the Mall of Memphis as the largest in Tennessee. That structure held the title until 1994 when West Town Mall in Knoxville completed an expansion.

=== Expansion and renovation ===
In 1982, JCPenney was added to anchor the north wing along with 24 stores in a $10 million expansion project.

Cain-Sloan was sold to national department store chain Dillard's in 1987, occupying the space for the next four years, while the mall theater Carmike Cinemas was acquired in July 1989.

In 1991, a $25 million expansion converted Dillard's into 30 smaller shops while a new Dillard's and parking garage were constructed on a previous parking lot space. On September 20, 1991, the non-profit company Hickory Hollow Mall Merchants Association, established on opening day in 1978, was dissolved.

The food court was expanded in 1993 as Hickory Hollow remained competitive despite the opening of five new malls in the Nashville area. On April 25, 1997, Carmike Cinemas opened the Hickory 8 in the east parking lot leading to the closure of the mall's original theater shortly thereafter.

In 1998, Castner Knott's 100-year history came to an end when they were acquired by Dillard's, the anchor of the east wing undergoing a constant metamorphosis over the next seven years. In Nashville, all five of Castner-Knott's high-volume mall locations were within shopping complexes that already contained Dillard's. To avoid antitrust violations, those spaces were sold to Saks Incorporated and rebranded as Proffitt's including the Hickory Hollow location which was then extensively remodeled.

In 2005, Proffitt's was sold to Belk. However, the location at Hickory Hollow had been sold to May Company and rebranded as Hecht's a few years prior, in 2001.

CBL & Associates, the real estate investment trust that manages Chattanooga's Hamilton Place, bought Hickory Hollow Mall for nearly $200 million in the summer of 1998. By the year 2000 roughly 702,000 inhabitants resided in the mall's primary trade area (20-mile radius) and secondary trade area (40-mile radius), a number that would swell to nearly one million by 2015. To compete with the city's newer malls, more renovations took place in 2002 and 2003 adding a children's play area and a revamped food court along with new carpeting, updated fixtures, and architecturally enhanced entrances.

=== Decline ===
By 2005, Hickory Hollow Mall's appraisal value had slipped to $70 million. After enjoying a relatively low vacancy rate throughout its existence, 2006 would prove to be a pivotal year in the mall's history. Numerous dynamics during the mid-2000s caused the shopping center to become a victim of suburban retail decline. Contributing factors included drastic changes in community demographics, a sharp increase in Antioch's violent crime rate, and several well-publicized shootings on the mall's property within a relatively short span of time. Subsequent dwindling mall traffic, competition from more modern shopping venues, and the untimely economic struggles of several large retailers dealt a crushing blow to the mall.

The earliest recorded shooting in the immediate mall vicinity occurred on November 3, 2004. Brian Schweitzer was fatally shot outside the U.S. Courthouse Credit Union bank on the east side of the mall by Metro Police officer Shawn Taylor. Schweitzer, himself a former policeman, had robbed two other banks that morning and attempted to flee when officer Taylor identified the suspect outside the Antioch bank and fired.

The population of the 37013 ZIP code increased significantly from 51,343 to 78,406 during the 2000s, and with the population explosion came major demographic changes. Antioch's median household income had decreased by $9,893 by 2006, and the neighborhood's rate of violent crimes, property crimes, and murders surpassed the national average.

With the opening of Opry Mills on May 12, 2000, patrons on the east side of Nashville had a newer, more modern shopping mall to patronize. To the south, Stones River Mall in Murfreesboro completed major renovations between 2006 and 2008, while in October 2007, The Avenue Murfreesboro, a large outdoor shopping area, opened in a rapidly growing area just six exits south of Hickory Hollow.

In early 2006 JCPenney became the first anchor to depart the mall, ending its 24-year presence in the north wing. A new JCPenney opened on March 1 in Mt. Juliet's new Providence Marketplace in the eastern suburbs of Nashville. In their absence, mall occupancy had fallen from 91% in 2003 to 82% in 2006 when the 138,000 sq ft (12,800 m^{2}) JCPenney space was acquired by Steve & Barry's University Sportswear in May of 2006. Antioch's Starwood Amphitheatre closed after 20 years on October 21, 2006.

In 2008, Hickory Hollow would lose three of its largest tenants. Dillard's began liquidating its inventory in May and closed on August 2, initiating the mass exodus of smaller stores. That same year, Linens ‘n Things closed all national stores to exclusively operate online, while Steve & Barry's announced their bankruptcy on November 20, 2008, and closed in early 2009. By that time, large stores outside the mall had also closed their doors, including Circuit City, closing all locations nationally, as well as Toys "R" Us, Pier 1 Imports, Michaels, and Office Depot. At the end of 2009, store occupancy had fallen below 70%, and Hickory Hollow was ranked by U.S. News & World Report as one of America's 10 most endangered malls. Sales dropped to $187 per square foot of retail space, under 45% of the national average of $420, and the value of the mall was severely downgraded to $12.6 million.

By early 2010, the north and south wings were practically vacant, while the food court lost vital franchises Subway on January 3 and Chick-fil-A on January 8. Major tenants The Children's Place, Hot Topic, New York & Company, and Lane Bryant announced they would vacate the mall by January 23, citing poor sales since the departure of Dillard's and JCPenney. Meanwhile, the east and west wings, respectively flanked by Macy's and Sears, remained heavily occupied by such notable franchises as Aéropostale, Charlotte Russe, Wet Seal, Bath & Body Works, Electronic Express, and Buckle. The Hickory Hollow Action Partnership began meetings on March 9, 2010, formed under chairman Ben Freeland, owner of nearby Freeland Chevrolet Superstore, with the hope of changing the community's negative perception.

News coverage of several violent acts that occurred on the mall's grounds influenced the perception of a lack of safety at Hickory Hollow Mall. On May 11, 2010, around 9:00 p.m., 18-year-old Marcus Caruthers robbed two shoppers at gunpoint, taking their purchases along with their wallets and cell phones. On November 18, 2011, around 9:20 p.m., a mall patron was shot in the leg during an armed robbery attempt in the mall parking lot outside of Sears. On January 20, 2012, around 8:00 p.m., two gunmen approached a woman outside the south end of the mall and ordered her into a vehicle demanding cash. Four male friends approached the vehicle in her defense and one of them was shot in the shoulder.

On December 27, 2011, CEO Louis D'Ambrosio announced that struggling Sears would close 100 to 120 locations nationwide. Two days later, the announcement came that Hickory Hollow Sears, which had anchored the west wing since the mall's opening in 1978, would close. Six days later, on January 4, 2012, CEO Terry J. Lundgren announced Macy's intended to close five underperforming locations nationwide including the Hickory Hollow store. By mid-March 2012, Sears closed in the west wing and Macy's vacated the east wing, leaving the mall with no department stores. In April 2012, it was announced the final big box out parcel tenant would be departing as Best Buy (originally the Hills department store) closed 50 stores nationwide, part of the company's plan to eliminate underperforming stores. The Hickory Hollow location was shuttered on May 12.

With only 83 stores remaining on Hickory Hollow's directory, CBL & Associates vice president Katie Reinsmidt announced on June 1, 2012, that the company was terminating the leases of all but 12 stores in an effort to reinvent itself. The remaining tenants were given 30 to 60 days to vacate the mall, with the rest closing by July 31. Reinsmidt stated "We are working closely with local officials to explore options that would recreate Hickory Hollow and allow the center to best serve the needs of the community.".

Hickory Hollow's arcade had been a popular attraction since the mall's beginning, opening originally as The Gold Mine, before being occupied by Tilt, and finally by the locally owned, retro video gaming Game Galaxy Arcade. On the weekend of June 22–24, 2012, Game Galaxy hosted the Midwest Championship video game competition, a regional qualifier for the 2012 Evolution Championship Series in Las Vegas. At the competition's conclusion, Game Galaxy Arcade closed on June 24 and relocated on the opposite side of Bell Road, in the strip mall occupied by Best Buy; Game Galaxy has since moved this location to Smyrna, TN. On November 7, 2012, Target, located just on the opposite side of I-24 (around a mile from the mall), announced that it would close its 31-year-old Hickory Hollow area store on February 2, 2013, due to poor financial performance. On June 17, 2013, WKRN reported that within a one-mile radius of the mall, there had been 422 crimes reported over the past year in contrast to 399 around Rivergate Mall and 202 around Opry Mills.

=== Revitalization projects ===
During the summer of 2012, CBL & Associates announced a multimillion-dollar plan to revitalize Hickory Hollow Mall in conjunction with the Nashville Board of Parks and Recreation, the Metro Arts Commission, and the Nashville Public Library. Nashville Mayor Karl Dean was active in the effort to transform the struggling mall into a mixed-use facility. Nashville State Community College purchased the 200,000 sq ft (19,000 m^{2}) former Dillard's space for around $3 million and spent another $12.5 million converting it into a satellite campus, debuting its first classes on August 25, 2012.

In late October 2012, real estate investor Rajesh Aggarwal and his wife Dr. Reita Aggarwal, a doctor of internal medicine in nearby Murfreesboro, offered to purchase a small space in the mall for $1 million with the intention of starting a medical clinic. Instead, the Aggarwals were offered the entire inner portion of the mall for $1 million by owners CBL & Associates (not including former department store spaces and the vacant Electronic Express location) and the couple made the purchase under the name Global Mall Partnership. Securing lease agreements with 60 new proprietors reflecting the diversity of Antioch, especially Middle Eastern and Latino business owners, the Aggarwals made plans to fill the first level with American franchises and the second level with international retail stores by late 2012 and early 2013. They announced on January 8, 2013, that the facility would be renamed Global Mall at The Crossings. The grand re-opening was held on May 18, 2013, rebranded as Tennessee's first international mall with 20 restaurants and retailers and plans to expand to 80 tenants by mid-summer.

In December 2013, Brentwood businessman Charles Jones bought the former Macy's space for $1.6 million, converting the converted the 172,000 sq ft (16,000 m^{2}) space into a venue for trade shows, corporate meetings, and weddings.

On October 9, 2013, Nashville's Metropolitan Sports Authority and the Nashville Predators professional hockey franchise broke ground for a $14 million facility containing dual NHL-sized ice rinks on the north side of the mall just outside the former JCPenney location. Becoming the Nashville area's third dual ice rink, The Ford Ice Center opened on August 19, 2014, to high school hockey team practices and public ice skating sessions. The official grand opening took place September 12 in conjunction with the Nashville Predators Rookie Tournament, while the team's AHL affiliate the Milwaukee Admirals held their September pre-season training camp there. As part of the Nashville Predators’ initiative to spread hockey throughout Middle Tennessee, the team will host hockey camps at the facility but will rarely practice here, remaining at the Centennial Sportsplex. The rink will however host the Vanderbilt club hockey team, the Junior Preds organization, and many local high school hockey games. Olympic gold medalist and NBC figure skating announcer Scott Hamilton, a Middle Tennessee resident, operates his skating academy at the facility with assistance from former Olympian Bill Fauver. The building features a 2,000 sq ft (190 m^{2}) pro shop for hockey equipment and a restaurant-style concession stand. On January 15, 2015, the Nashville Predators held their first practice at the Ford Ice Center open to the public from 11:00 a.m. to noon.

In mid-October 2014, the Aggarwals listed the building for sale. Represented by the real estate firm CBRE, both tenants and a potential buyer were being sought with prospects of a charter school, call center, medical facilities, and large anchor retailers occupying the inner core of the mall. On October 17, 2014, the 22,000 sq ft (2,000 m^{2}) Nashville Global Market, a massive international grocery store, opened in the space formerly occupied by Foot Locker and Lerner New York bringing the mall's occupancy up to 30%.

The Metropolitan Government of Nashville and Davidson County purchased the old J.C. Penney building, opening the Southeast Branch of the Nashville Public Library and Southeast Community Center on October 21, 2014. Featuring an NBA-sized basketball court and a youth basketball partnership with the Memphis Grizzlies, it is the largest rec center in Nashville at 55,000 sq ft (5,100 m^{2}). The new library encompasses 25,000 sq ft (2,300 m^{2}), doubling the size of the previous neighborhood library, and the value of both complexes and the adjacent Southeast Davison Complex Park is roughly $15 million.

On November 17, 2014, plans were finalized by developer Oldacre McDonald for a massive 300-acre shopping center and residential complex at the Hickory Hollow Parkway exit on the opposite side of I-24, but to date that development has not begun. By the end of 2014, only 25% of the mall's retail space was occupied. In 2015, Metro Council District 32 Councilwoman Jacobia Dowell, who represents the district in which the Global Mall is located, addressed the negative perception of Antioch crime. She explained that crime incidents occurring in the general Southeast Nashville vicinity are often mistakenly associated with Antioch.

=== Final years ===
Target temporarily expressed interest in the 175,000 sq ft (16,300 m^{2}) former Sears location, the last big-box anchor unsold at the mall, but later backed out. In March 2016, Brentwood-based real estate firm Crestview Resources (owner of the headquarters of Brookdale Senior Living) finally purchased the property from Sears Roebuck and Co. for $5 million, including 17 acres of surrounding space. On July 6, 2016, the Bridgestone tire company headquartered in Nashville announced plans to relocate its IT and customer service centers to the upper floor of the former Sears space.

In 2018, the Global Mall was closed on Mondays, open 10:00 a.m. to 8:00 p.m. Tuesday through Saturday and noon to 6:00 p.m. Sunday. This meant weekly hours of operating were 15.5 hours less than the original Hickory Hollow Mall, a facility that was open 10:00 a.m. to 9:00 p.m. Monday through Saturday and 12:30 p.m. to 6:00 p.m. Sunday. There were 58 current tenants and 7 rental spaces among the 136 available retail units. Retailers were exclusively influenced by Hispanic, African, and Middle Eastern cultures reflecting the demographics of Southeast Nashville. There were seven restaurants operating with an average health score of 98 according to 2015 inspection data. The mall served as headquarters for the Spanish radio station El Jefe 96.7 FM (alternatively WMGC 810 AM) and for the Spanish newspaper El Crucero.

=== Closure ===
On April 23, 2019, all remaining tenants were told by mall management to leave by May 31, stating that demolition plans were in the works, thus ending the mall's 41-year retail history while Bridgestone and Nashville State remained. Additionally, the previous month, there were numerous codes violations found within and around the building, some dangerous.

Friday, May 31, 2019, was the mall's final day of operation. On Saturday, June 1, 2019, a sign was posted at the main entrance facing the Ford Ice Center indicating the mall was closed, ending 41 years of continuous service. On June 10, 2019, the Tennessean newspaper reported that local Antioch business investor Ben Freeland, owner of the nearby car dealership Freeland Chevrolet, was under contract to purchase the mall from the Aggarwals. He proposed various ideas for redevelopment, but expressed that it would not contain retail space. The plan was scrapped in November 2019.

In April of 2022, The Nashville City Council voted to purchase the property and an adjoining property for $46 million. Vanderbilt University Medical Center signed a letter of intent to turn 600,000 square feet of the property into medical offices. Other parts of the property were intended to be used for a performing arts center, while other future ways to utilize the property have been discussed in local community meetings.

In 2024, plans for the mall's demolition were confirmed with only the four original department store spaces being preserved. However, the possibility of a medical center, performing arts center, senior center, and even a bus transit center are still on the table.
