= One Bellevue Place =

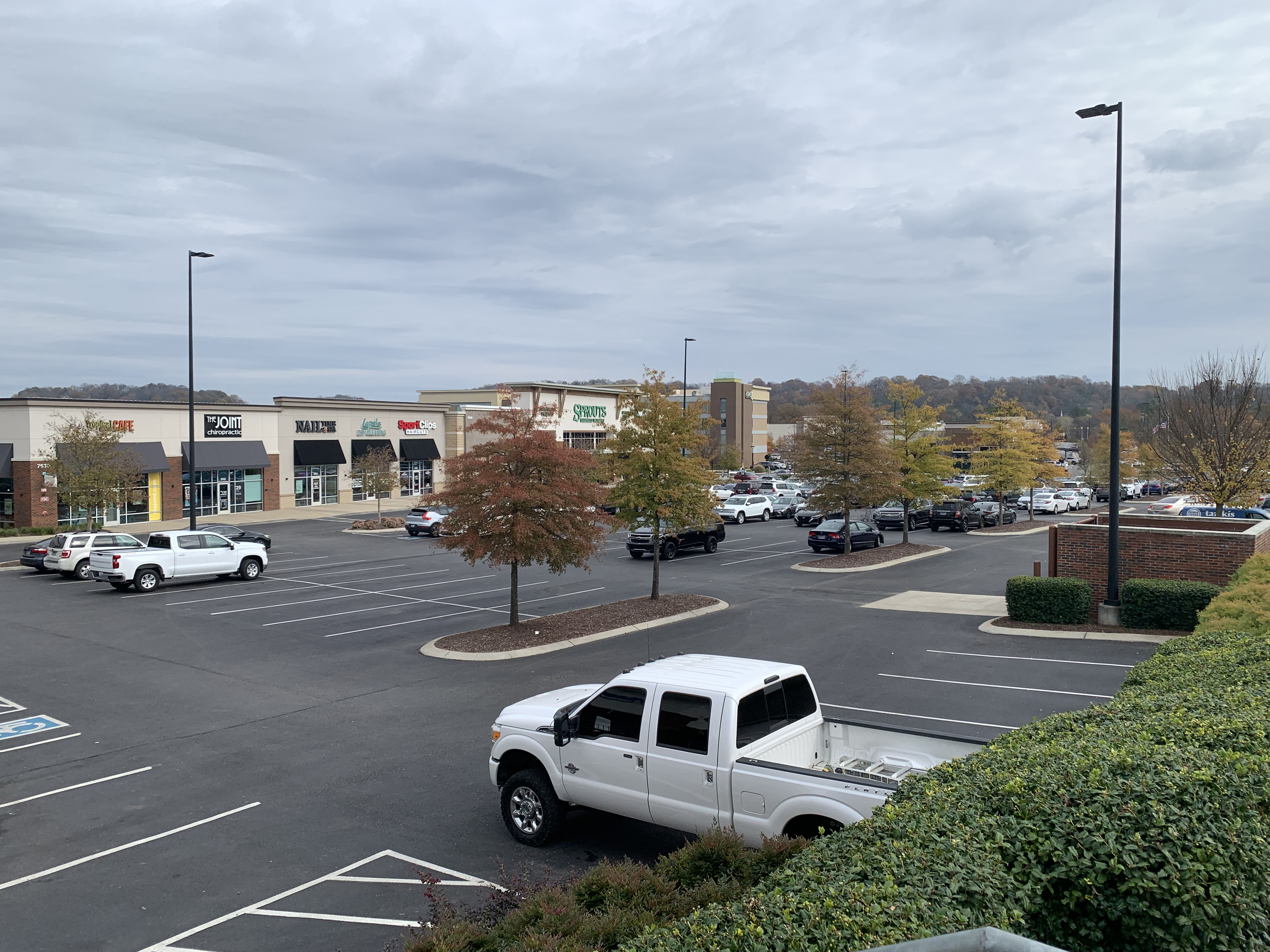
- The southern side of One Bellevue Place in November 2024
- Location: Nashville, Tennessee, United States
- Coordinates: 36°4′52″N 86°56′51″W
- Address: 7620 Hwy 70 South
- Opened: August 9, 1990
- Closed: May 31, 2008 (demolished 2015)(original mall)
- Developer: Taubman Centers
- Owner: Retail Properties of America, Inc.
- Num. of stores: 90+
- Num. of anchor tenants: 3
- Floor area: 848,545 square feet (78,832.4 m^{2}) GLA
- Floors: 2

One Bellevue Place is a regional shopping center in southwestern Nashville, Tennessee, specifically in the Bellevue neighborhood. Opened in 1990 as an enclosed regional shopping mall named Bellevue Center, it had capacity for over 90 stores on two floors totaling 848,545 square feet (78,832.4 m^{2}). The mall itself opened in 1990, began showing signs of decline during the early 2000s recession, and closed in 2008. Two of its three anchor tenants continued to operate beyond the mall's closure, but both would eventually vacate the property as well. The entire structure, including the three adjacent anchor buildings and an outparcel, was demolished in 2015. A new mixed-use complex opened on the site in 2017.

== History ==
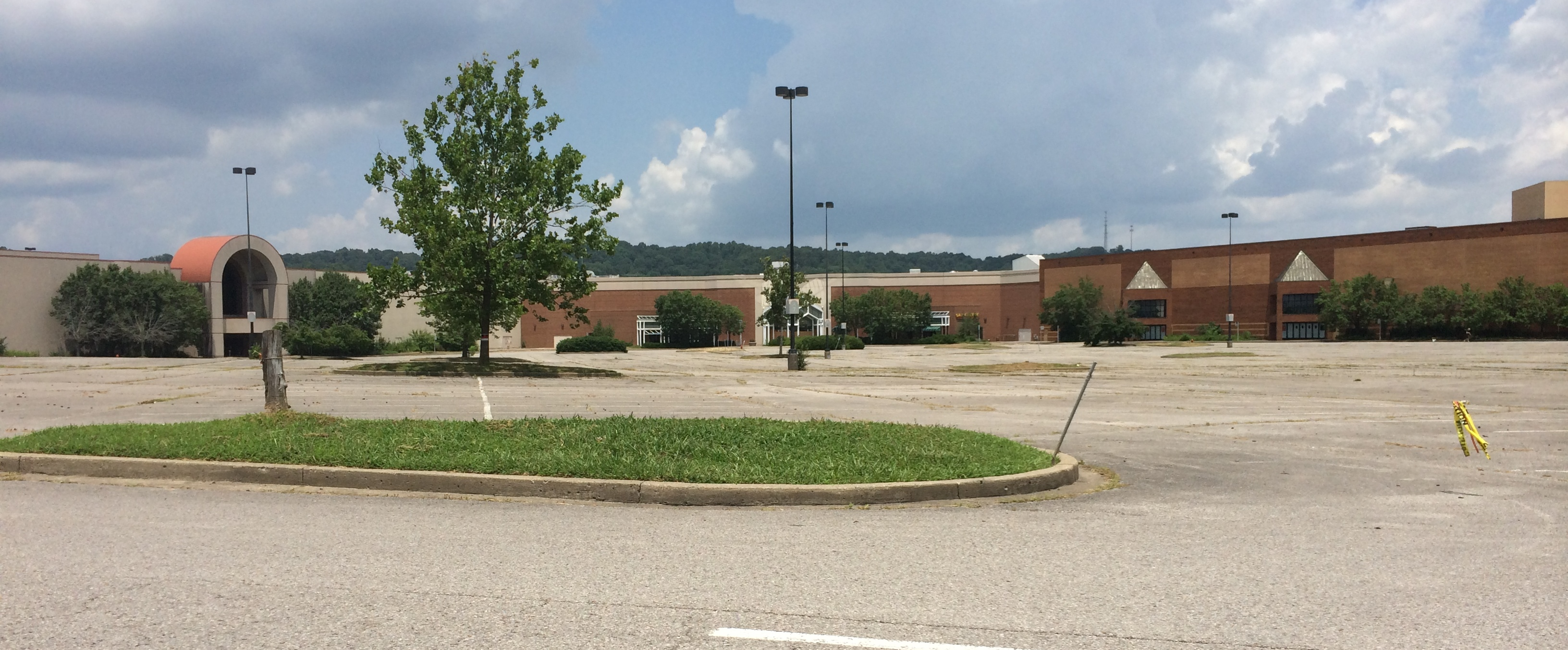
Bellevue Center in 2015, just prior to demolition.

The first plans for a mall in the Nashville neighborhood of Bellevue were announced in 1971, when local real estate developer Roy Shainberg submitted approval plans for a mall to Metro Nashville's planning and zoning commission on behalf of Cleveland, Ohio-based developer M. H. Hausman Co. The original plans called for a mall to be built on U.S. Route 70S between Interstate 40 and Sawyer Brown Road. Construction was to begin in 1973 and would consist of two phases, with the first to be completed in 1975 and the second in 1977. The first phase would consist of 900,000 square feet (84,000 m^{2}) of retail space with three anchor stores; the second phase would consist of 300,000 square feet (28,000 m^{2}) of additional shop space and space for up to two more department stores. The design of the mall would include marble flooring and fountains, and it would consist of two levels connected by escalators. The Cleveland, Ohio-based firm of William Dorsky and Associates would be the mall's architect. A newly built road would encircle the mall in order to address concerns from local residents over increased traffic, while a 20-foot (6.1 m) "buffer zone" of shrubbery and trees would make its design "harmonious" with the rest of the community. Also planned for the mall's periphery were a supermarket facing U.S. Route 70S, a 200-room hotel, and a business park facing Interstate 40. Overall building costs were estimated at $50 million, and it would be the largest mall in the state of Tennessee upon completion.

By March 1974, Shainberg had announced that Nashville-based real estate company Belz Enterprises and department store chain JCPenney would be co-developing the mall, with the latter also serving as one of the anchor stores. According to The Tennessean, both companies had agreed to join in the development after M. H. Hausman had begun to undergo negotiations with prospective tenants, since JCPenney had just begun a real estate development division and Shainberg had previously handled land acquisition and leasing for Belz's 100 Oaks Mall, also in Nashville. In 1978, Taubman Centers announced that it had replaced JCPenney as co-developer, but that the latter would still be building a store in the mall. The planning and zoning commission approved Taubman's conceptual site plan for the mall in late 1978, under which the mall would begin construction in early 1979 and open in 1981. In addition to all of the features conceptualized by M. H. Hausman, Taubman's plans also called for carpeted seating areas, planters, skylights, and modern sculptures commissioned specifically for the mall. Construction was further delayed due to difficulty in finding suitable anchor stores and tenants, along with delays in rezoning the property for commercial use, and road improvements along Interstate 40 and U.S. Route 70S. By late 1987, Taubman had also confirmed that Castner Knott and Dillard's had signed on as two of the mall's anchor stores.

=== 1990s-2000s ===
Bellevue Center opened on August 9, 1990 with Castner Knott and Dillard's situated at the far ends of the trident-shaped mall. Spaces for two other anchors were included in the design. One of these (the one closest to Dillard's) was delegated for Nashville's first Macy's store, but the project was canceled and nothing was ever built on the site. Macy's eventually came to the mall in the former Castner Knott location after a series of acquisitions (first Castner Knott to Proffitt's, later Hecht's before Macy's in 2006). Other tenants included KB Toys, Limited Too, Abercrombie & Fitch, Gap Inc., and Electronic Express. Despite being instrumental in the initial development of the complex, JCPenney would never operate a store at Bellevue Center.

Bellevue Center's upscale offerings showed initial promise, but foot traffic at the mall began to decline soon after, in the face of new competition. Cool Springs Galleria in Franklin opened in 1991, and Nashville's Mall at Green Hills underwent a major expansion that same year. This sudden influx of new mall space in more heavily populated and centrally located areas also included new locations of retailers whose Nashville presence had previously been exclusive to Bellevue Center.

Sears came to the mall in 1999 (shortly after Castner Knott became Proffitt's), building a new store on the empty anchor space in the northeast corner of the property. Despite the arrival of a third anchor, patronage of Bellevue Center continued to fall well short of expectations entering the new millennium. The ensuing early 2000s recession did not help matters. Major retail tenants began abandoning the complex soon after, leading to Bellevue Center's status as a dead mall just a decade into its existence, despite the continued presence of its three anchors. Some of the available parcels within the mall would be leased to local retailers, while others were repurposed as offices, churches, and performing arts studios in the years to follow.

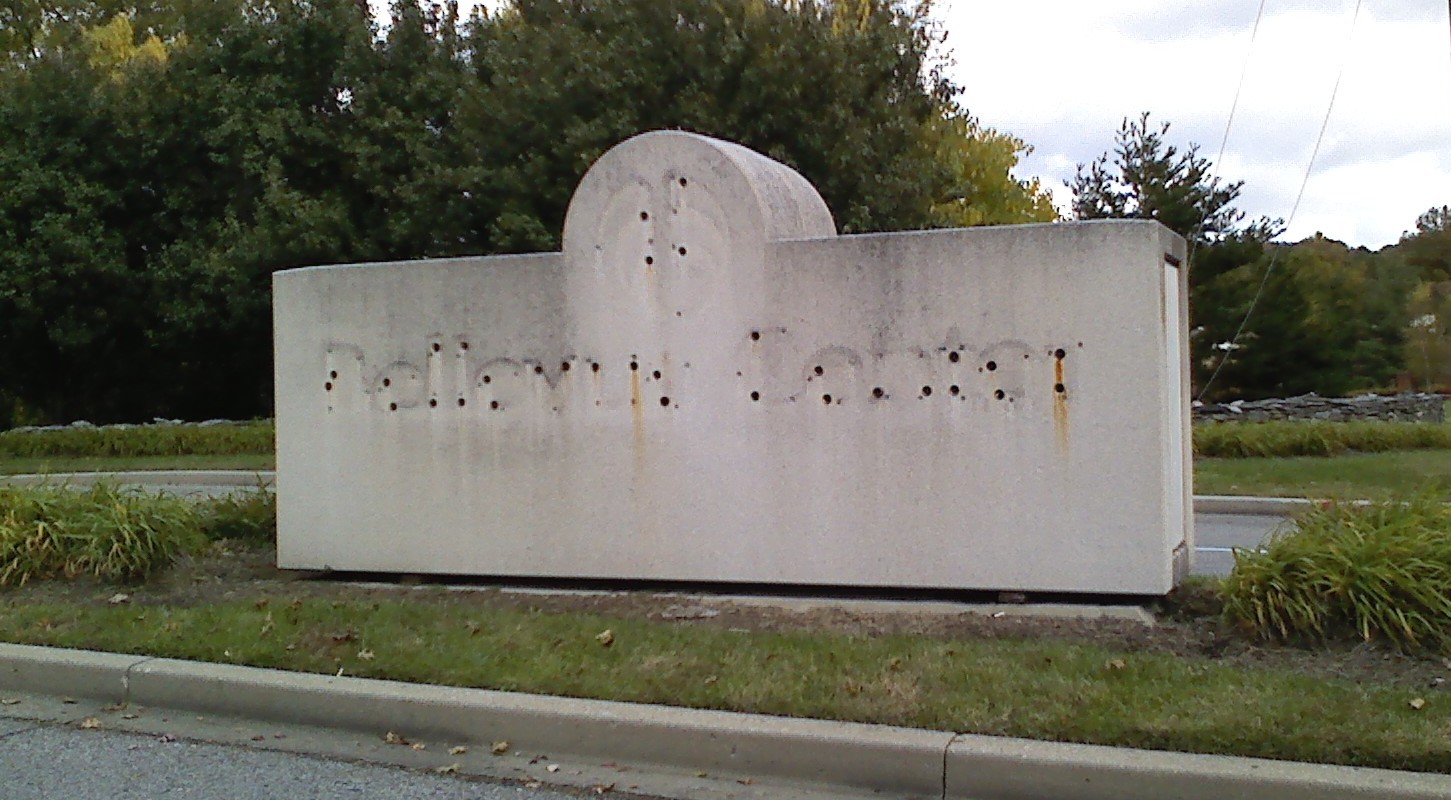
Sign at the Sawyer Brown Road entrance with logo and lettering removed, as seen in 2010

When Dillard's closed its store and sold its property to the mall's owners (Oaktree Capital Management) in 2007, following years of declining sales, drastic plans for redevelopment were announced. Bellevue Center officially closed on May 31, 2008, when the last of its non-anchor tenants moved out.

Initial redevelopment plans included converting the former Dillard's building into a branch of the Metro Nashville Public Library (bottom floor) and Kohl's department store (top level). The area formerly occupied by the mall itself would have been replaced with an open-air lifestyle center. Sears and Macy's announced intentions to remain open through the redevelopment process and anchor the redeveloped property, but Macy's soon after chose its Bellevue store to be one of eleven stores nationally to close during the late 2000s recession. When Macy's closed on March 15, 2009, Sears was left as the final operating retailer at Bellevue Center.

=== 2010s-2020s ===
During late 2011, the Metro Government announced its intent to build a new Bellevue library elsewhere, abandoning its plans to locate at the mall site. Around the same time, developer Crosland Southeast began a new redevelopment plan for the former mall, which also was later withdrawn.

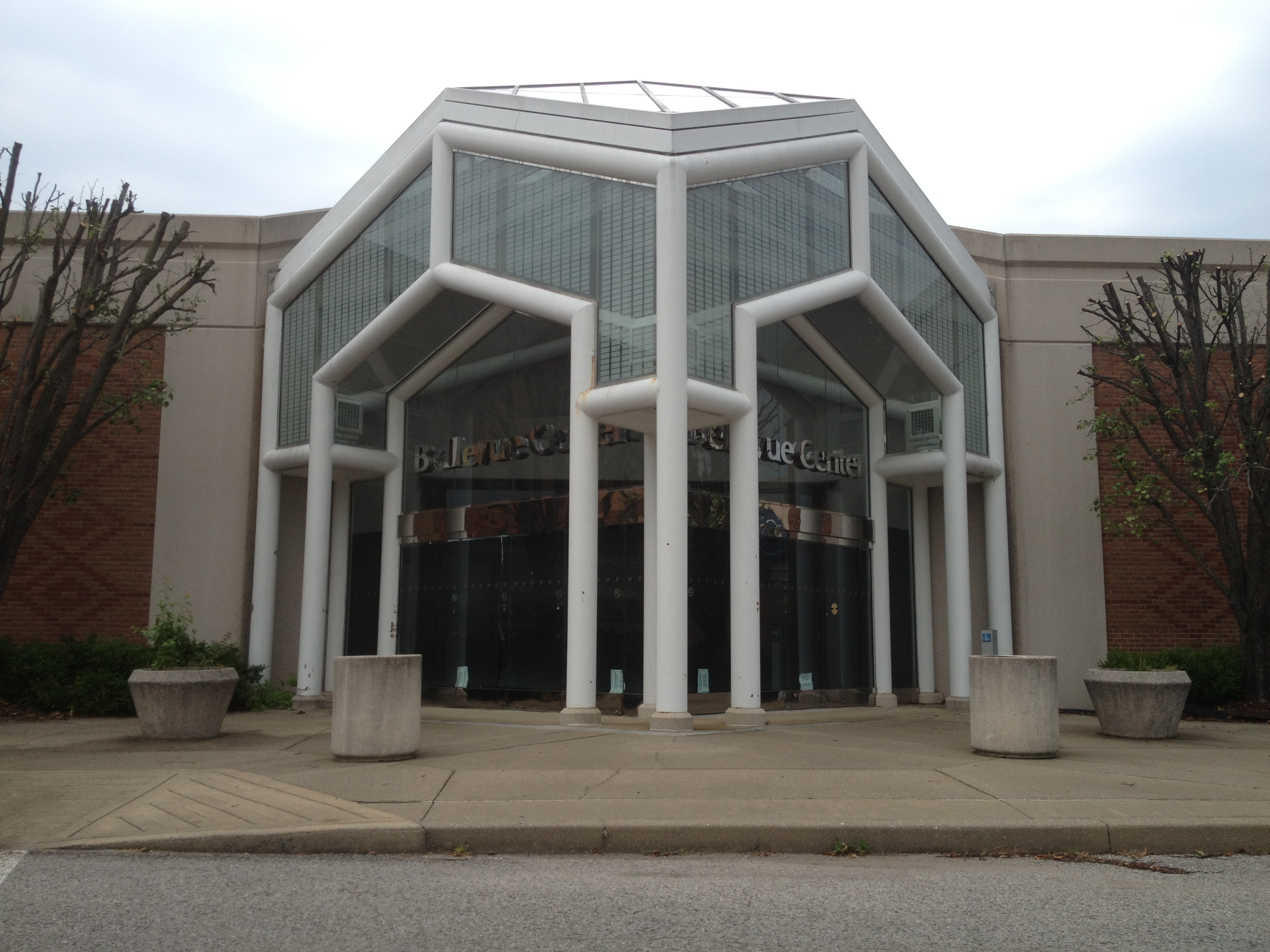
The entrance to Bellevue Center in 2012.

In November 2014, Crosland Southeast unveiled an updated development plan, calling for the demolition of the mall, which would then be replaced with a mixed-use center called "One Bellevue Place." This development would feature a hotel, a community ice rink facility operated by the Nashville Predators, 300 multifamily residential units, up to 125,000 square feet (11,600 m^{2}) of professional and medical office space, a cinema multiplex, and up to 600,000 square feet (56,000 m^{2}) of retail space.

In May 2015, Sears began liquidating its store, and closed it in August. Demolition of the mall and its adjacent anchor buildings commenced on August 22, 2015, and was completed by the end of the year.

The first tenants at One Bellevue Place began opening in August 2017. The renovated development includes an AMC movie theater, Sprouts grocery store, Burlington, Michaels, HomeGoods, Ulta Beauty, Home2 Suites hotel, Chick-fil-A, along with an apartment complex, a senior living community, a new Bellevue Community Center, and a dual-ice rink complex managed by the NHL's Nashville Predators.
