= Decatur Mall =

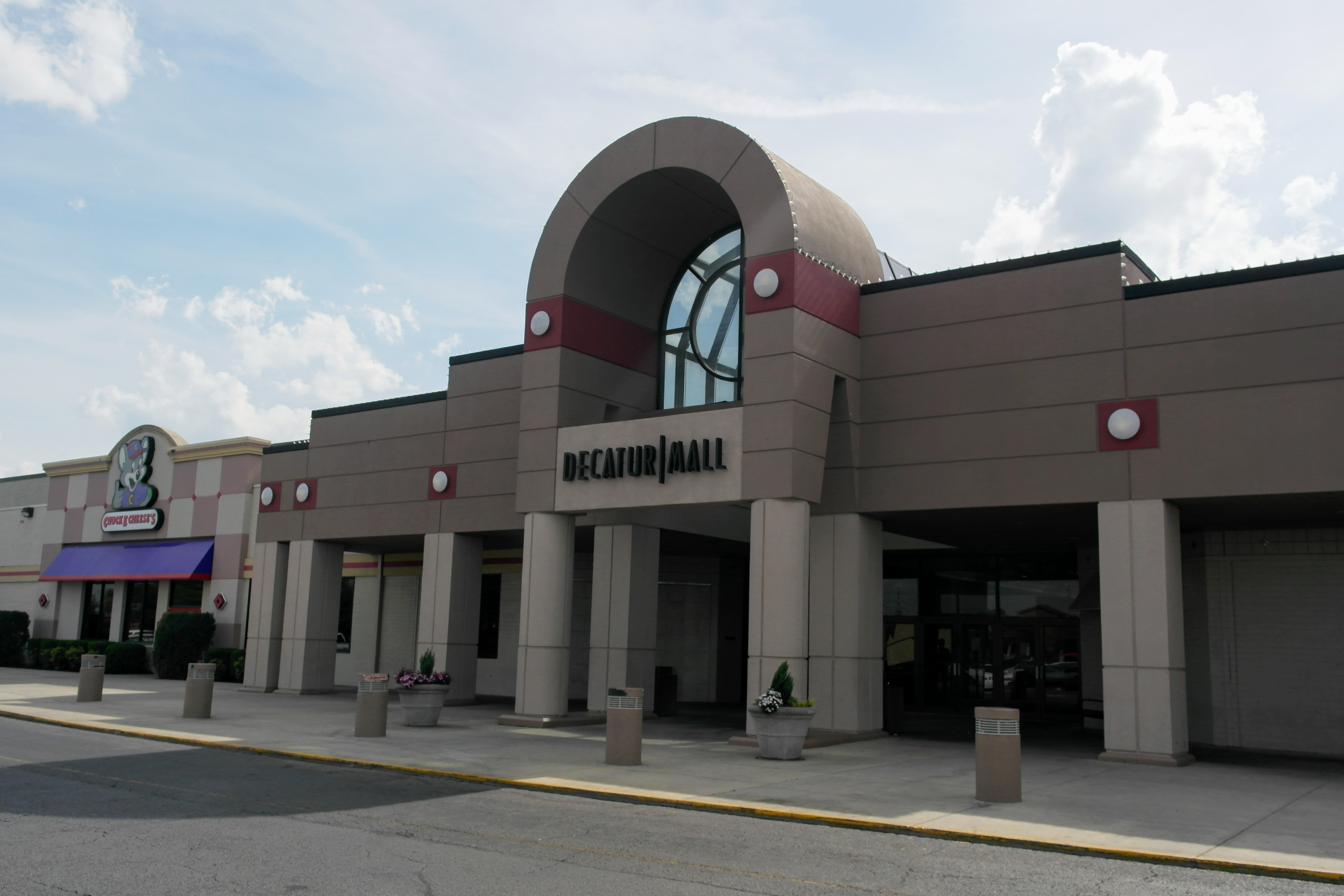
- Entrance to Decatur Mall, 2017
- Location: Decatur, Alabama, United States
- Coordinates: 34°34′21″N 87°01′01″W
- Address: 1801 Beltline Road
- Opened: 1978
- Developer: Bramalea
- Manager: Hull Property Group
- Owner: Hull Property Group
- Num. of stores: 20+ stores, movie theater
- Num. of anchor tenants: 4 (2 open, 2 vacant, 1 additional anchor store demolished)
- Floor area: 575,947 square feet (53,507 m^{2})
- Floors: 1
- Website: shopdecaturmall.com

Decatur Mall (formerly Beltline Mall, River Oaks Center, and Colonial Mall Decatur) is a regional shopping mall located southwest of downtown Decatur, Alabama on State Route 67. The mall is owned and managed by Hull Property Group. It is the only mall in the Decatur Metropolitan Area. Anchor stores include Belk, and Electronic Express. The mall also houses a AMC Theatres and a Chuck E. Cheese's.

== History ==
The Belk store was originally JCPenney until 1987, when JCPenney relocated to a new store and sold the old building to Parisian. Dillard's had two anchors in the mall: one that it acquired from Castner Knott in 1998, and a second which was originally Rogers. Both of these closed in 2011. The former Rogers store was partially demolished and replaced with a Carmike Cinemas movie theater in November 2012, while the former Castner Knott partially became Electronic Express in late 2014 and Bed Bath & Beyond in 2015.

JCPenney announced the closure of all its outlet stores in October 2013. The closure of the Sears store was announced in January 2014.

The vacant Sears building was demolished in early 2017. JCPenney's former space is now closed off to the main corridor of the mall and is currently for sale.

On May 30, 2021, it was announced that Bed Bath & Beyond would be closing on July 31, 2021.
