= Rivergate Mall =

Defunct shopping mall in Goodlettsville, Tennessee, U.S.

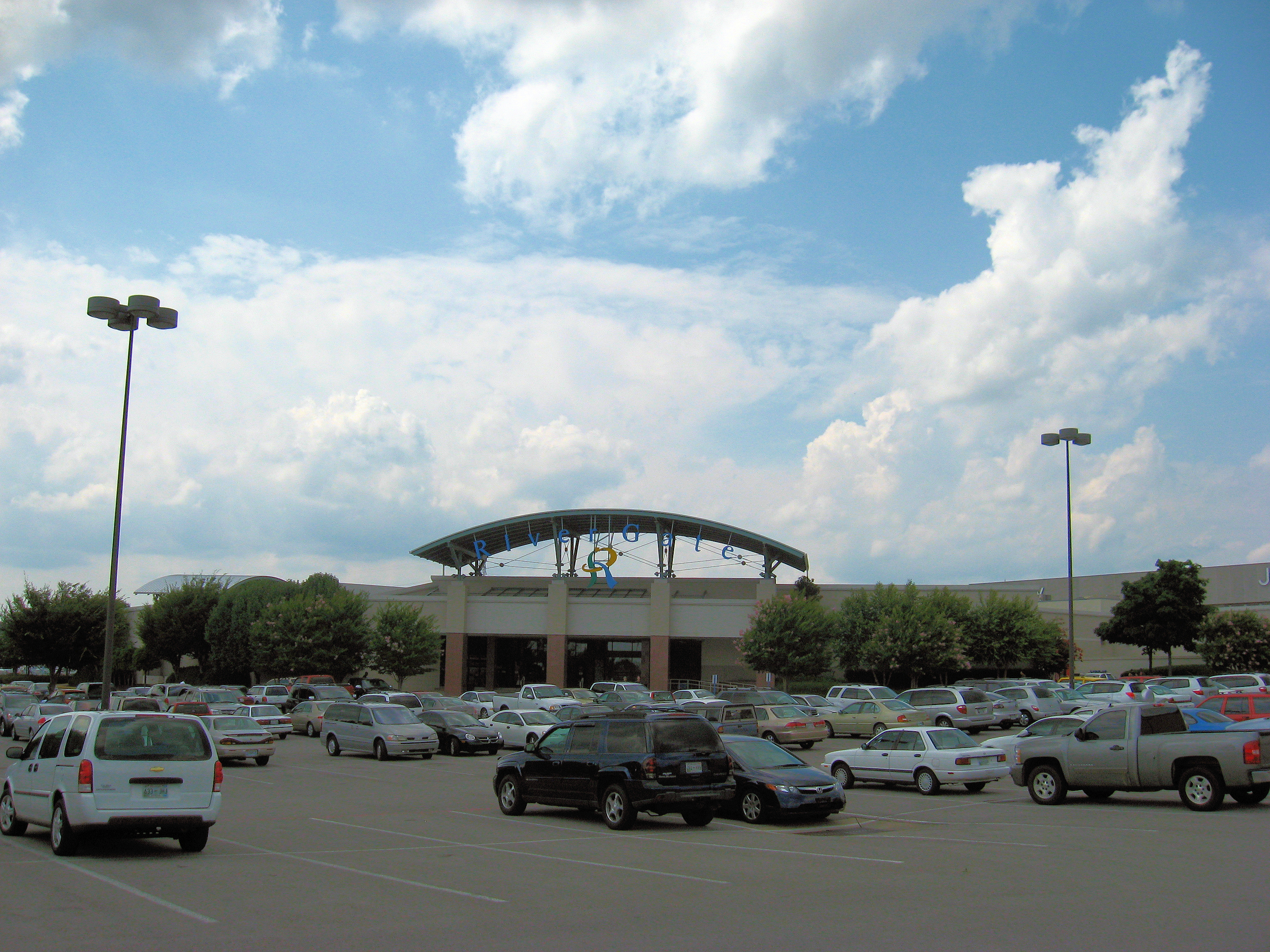
- Rivergate Mall in 2009
- Location: Goodlettsville, Tennessee, United States
- Coordinates: 36.302918°N 86.697901°W
- Address: 1000 Rivergate Parkway
- Opened: October 6, 1971; 55 years ago
- Closed: February 13, 2026; 8 months ago (mall interior)
- Demolished: March 2026 (currently in progress)
- Owner: Merus
- Num. of stores: 0 (formerly 81)
- Num. of anchor tenants: 1 (formerly 4)
- Floor area: 1,129,035 square feet (104,890.8 m^{2}) (GLA)
- Floors: 1 (3 in Dillard's and Macy’s, 2 in Sears and JCPenney)
- Website: rivergate-mall.com (Jan 2026 archive)

Rivergate Mall was a super-regional shopping mall located in Goodlettsville, Tennessee, United States, just outside of Nashville, the state capital of Tennessee. Opened in October 1971, the mall featured 1,129,035 square feet (104,890.8 m^{2}) of gross leasable area. It once held up to 80 stores and restaurants. Rivergate Mall opened with three anchor stores—Cain-Sloan, Castner Knott, and JCPenney—and later expansions added a food court and a new anchor space which was occupied by Sears. The mall underwent a decline in tenancy beginning in the 2000s, with several stores relocating to nearby shopping centers such as Opry Mills and the Streets of Indian Lake. The final interior tenants of the mall closed in December 2025, with the mall itself closing in February 2026. The mall was located in the core of a shopping district that is shared by the city of Goodlettsville and the Nashville neighborhood of Madison. This area is colloquially referred to by locals as "Rivergate," after the mall.

== History ==
=== 1970s to 1980s ===
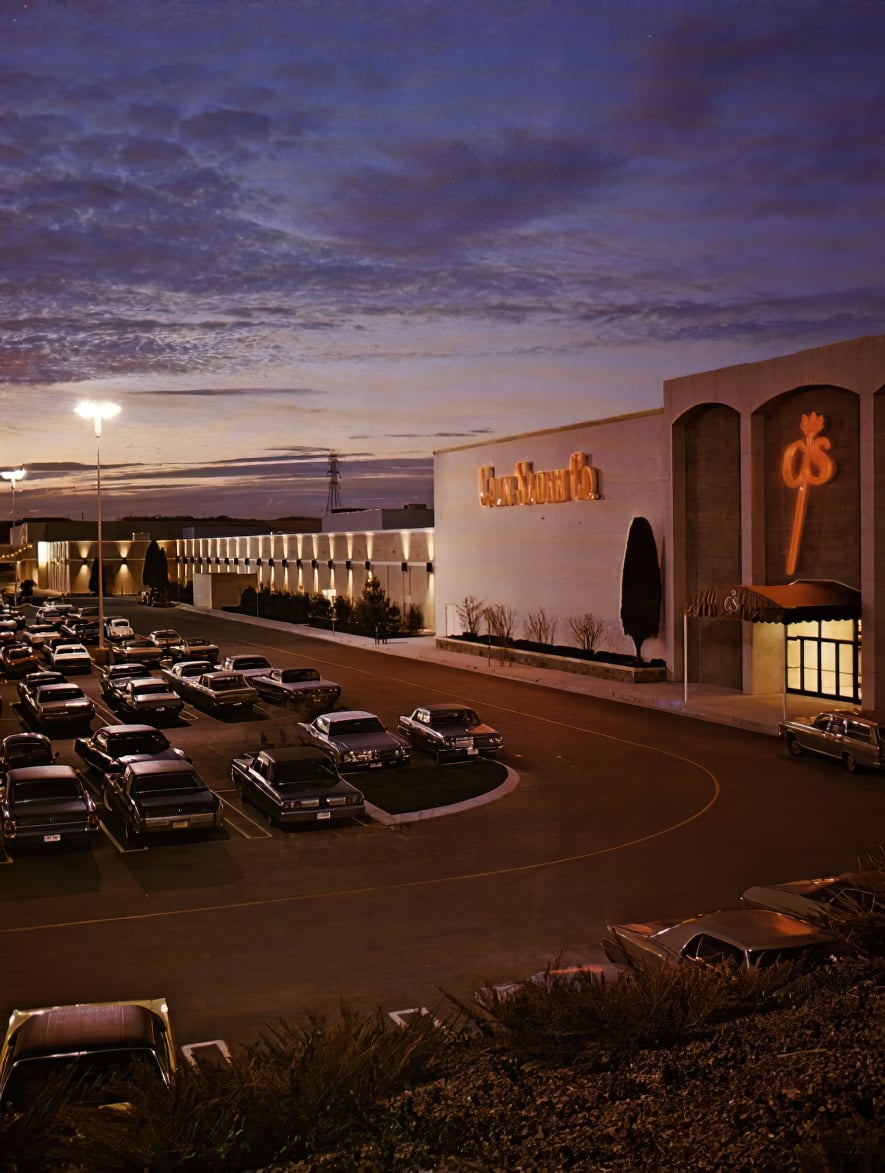
Cain-Sloan at the mall's opening, 1971

Rivergate Mall was built by Retail Planning Corporation, an Atlanta-based mall developer, just outside the state capital of Nashville, Tennessee within Goodletsville along Two Mile Pike. The mall officially opened on October 6, 1971. Upon its opening, Rivergate Mall became the largest mall in Tennessee, a title it would hold until the opening of Hickory Hollow Mall in 1978. The mall originally included three anchor stores: Cain-Sloan, Castner Knott, and JCPenney. Other major tenants at opening included Jo-Ann Fabrics, McCrory, and Walgreens. The mall's first expansion phase opened in November 1978, with a new parking area and 55,000 square feet (5,100 m^{2}) of retail space, which included 22 stores and 74 supporting shops. Journeys opened their first location in the mall in December 1986. Cain-Sloan sold its store to Dillard's in 1987, as a part of deal which included the sale of three Nashville-area locations. A wing featuring Sears, dozens of new parcels, and a food court was added in 1989.

=== 1990s to 2000s ===
During a tornado outbreak on May 18, 1995, part of the Rivergate Mall's roof collapsed, injuring more than a dozen people. The mall was sold to CBL Associates & Properties for $247 million in June 1998. In August of that year, Proffitt's purchased five Nashville-area Castner Knott's from Dillard's. Dillard's had acquired Castner Knott's through their purchase of the parent company Mercantile Stores Company. With the threat of competition from nearby Opry Mills, CBL renovated the mall in 1999, adding new carpeting and a new entranceway. Proffitt's sold its store to Hecht's in March 2001 as part of a deal to sell off nine locations. Linens 'n Things opened a store at the mall in 2003. In 2006, Macy's replaced Hecht's after Federated Department Stores, now Macy's Inc, purchased Hecht's parent company May Department Stores. By 2008, the Streets of Indian Lake was nearing completion in nearby Hendersonville, attracting many upscale retailers, causing a decline in shoppers at the mall. Incredible Dave's, a restaurant and entertainment center, replaced a mall wing in 2012, but closed in 2014.

=== 2010s to 2020s ===
In 2013, CBL sold three of their malls, including the Rivergate Mall, to Atlanta-based Hendon Properties in a partnership with an offshore investor for $176 million. An 11,695-square-foot Guitar Center opened in the mall in the spring of 2017, while existing tenant, teen apparel retailer rue21, opened a larger store with an additional 2,600 sq ft (240 m^{2}) in the summer of 2017. Another existing tenant, shoe retailer Foot Locker, added a new store with an additional 1,000 sq ft (93 m^{2}) in the fall of 2017. Sears closed its store at the mall in March 2019 as part of a plan to close 80 locations nationwide. Following the closure of Macy's in 2020, the anchor store's space was sold to Urban Story Ventures for $4 million. Rivergate Mall was listed for sale for an undisclosed price in March 2024. In January 2025, Cincinnati-based real estate company Merus (formerly known as Al. Neyer) submitted plans to redevelop the entire mall site, including the Macy's anchor building. The final interior tenants of the mall closed on December 31, 2025. Rivergate Mall closed on February 13, 2026, after the property was sold for $33 million. The buyer, Merus, announced they intended to demolish the mall and build a mixed-use real estate project. In March 2026, demolition on the mall officially started at the former Sears. Also in March 2026, JCPenney announced it would shut down its store at the mall that summer, leaving just Dillard’s remaining. As of April 2026, Dillard’s plans to remain open during the redevelopment. JCPenney shut down on June 21, 2026.
