= Stones River Town Centre =

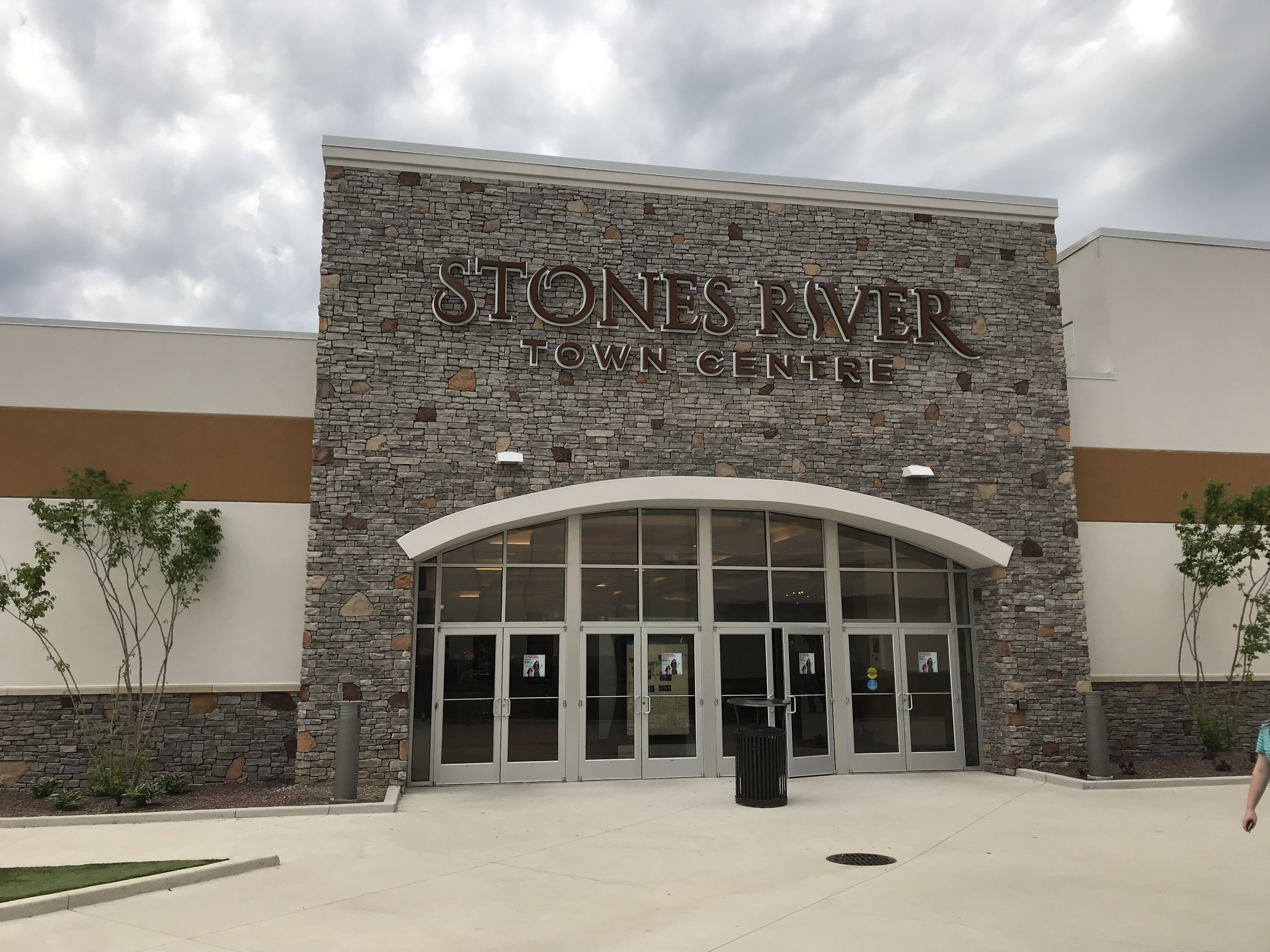
- Southern entrance to the Stones River Town Centre
- Location: Murfreesboro, Tennessee, U.S.
- Coordinates: 35.848505°N 86.418881°W
- Opened: 1992
- Developer: Stones River Real Estate, Aronov Realty
- Manager: Sterling Organization
- Num. of stores: 43
- Num. of anchor tenants: 7
- Floor area: 671,000 square feet
- Floors: 1 (2 in Dillard's)
- Parking: 3,000
- Website: shopstonesriver.com

Stones River Town Centre (formerly Stones River Mall) is a partially enclosed regional shopping mall in Murfreesboro, Tennessee, United States. Built in 1992, it was expanded and renovated in the late 2000s. The mall comprises more than fifty stores. The mall is owned and managed by Sterling Organization. The anchor stores are Shoe Station, Books-A-Million, Electronic Express, AMC Theatres, Strike & Spare, and JCPenney.

== History ==
The mall was first built in 1989, but it sat vacant and was foreclosed on due to the bankruptcy of its original developer. Despite this, both Walmart and Goody's were opened at that point, followed by Sears and Carmike Cinemas in 1990. The mall officially opened for business in 1992, under the ownership of Stones River Real Estate and Aronov Realty. The original layout of the mall included a large central fountain, Aladdin's Castle, a carousel and a small food court.

Walmart moved out of the mall in 1995, with the old location becoming the thirteenth location of local department store Castner Knott a year later. A Home Depot would also open right next to the mall on April 18, 1996. J. C. Penney joined in 1997, and Dillard's acquired the Castner Knott chain a year afterward. The mall was renovated in 1999.

Carmike Cinemas closed in August 2000, when the company filed for Chapter 11 bankruptcy.

Between 2006 and 2008, the mall underwent renovation which included the demolition of the existing JCPenney and Dillard's stores, as well as the former food court wing. The former Dillard's was demolished for an outdoor concourse, while JCPenney became a new food court. The carousel and Aladdin's Castle were removed and the center court fountain was moved to the Lifestyle area. JCPenney opened its new store in 2006 and Dillard's in 2007. Books-A-Million was also added as a junior anchor, while Goody's closed in 2009.

Sterling Organization bought the mall in 2015.

The food court closed in 2017 to make room for a brand new dine in theatre, AMC Stones River 9.

On November 8, 2018, it was announced that Sears would be closing as part of a plan to close 40 stores nationwide. The store closed by February 11, 2019.

The mall was renamed Stones River Town Centre in December 2018.

Strike and Spare bowling center opened in the former Sears location in September 2020.

Dillard's closed their store in mid to late January 2025. This location was the only one in the state of Tennessee that Dillard's leased and did not own outright, so it's speculated that the closure was due to failed lease renewal negotiations between Dillard's and Sterling Organization.
