= Gus Mayer =

Department store in the US

Gus Mayer Stores Inc.

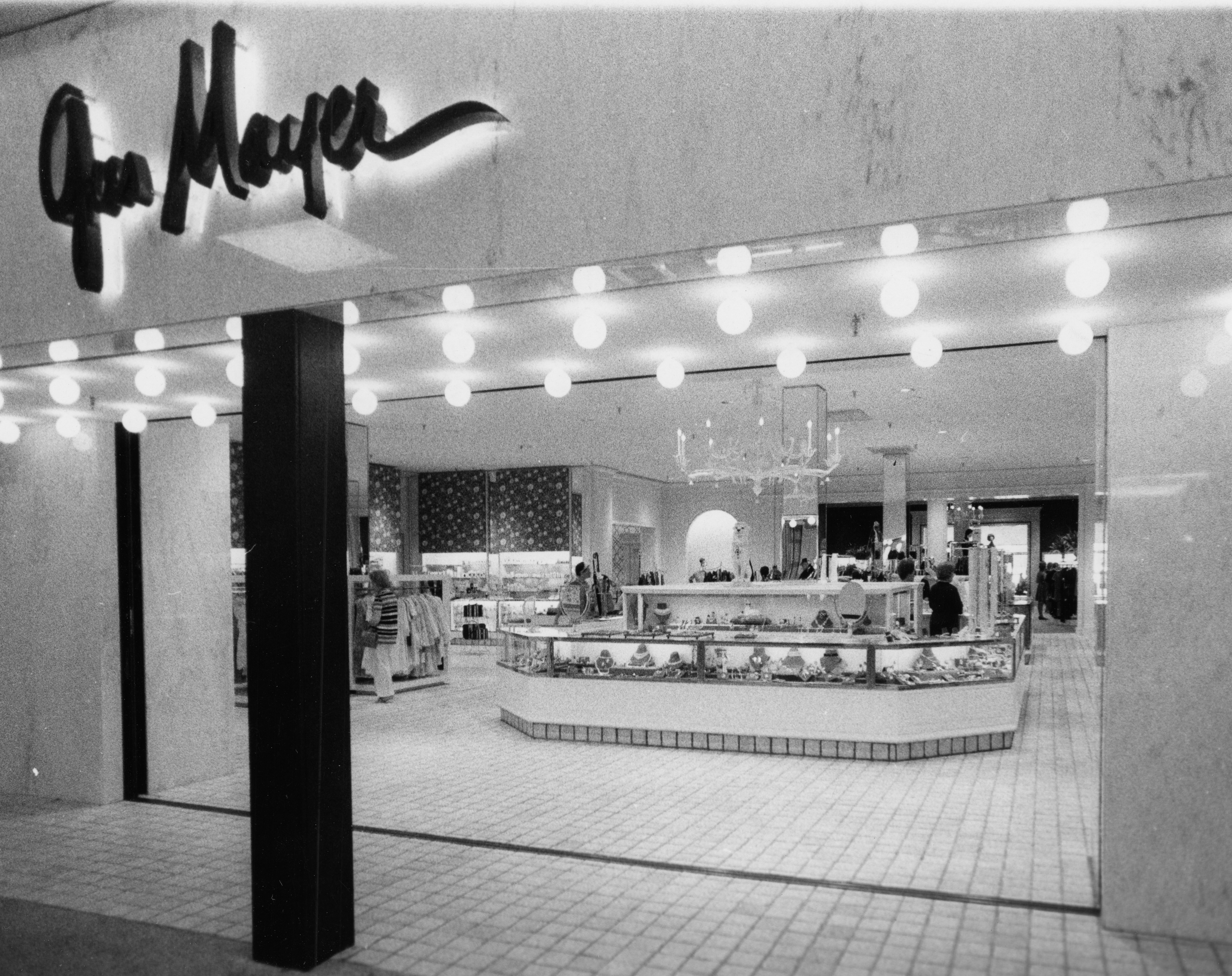
- Former Metaire, Louisiana, location in 1970
- Type: Subsidiary of Pizitz Management Group
- Industry: Retail
- Founded: 1900 (126 years ago)
- Headquarters: Birmingham, Alabama, U.S.
- Products: Clothing, footwear, jewelry and beauty products
- Website: http://www.gusmayer.com/

Gus Mayer Stores Inc. is a Birmingham, Alabama, based, family-owned department store. The two-store chain is owned by the Pizitz Management Group. It has locations at The Summit in the Greater Birmingham area and The Mall at Green Hills in Nashville, both of which are known as high-end retail centers.

Typical brands carried include 7 for all Mankind, Juicy Couture, Dolce & Gabbana, Roberto Cavalli, Gianfranco Ferré, Michael Kors, Zang Toi, Zac Posen, Lela Rose, St. John, Monique Lhuillier, and Burberry.

It was founded in 1900; the original Gus Mayer department store was located on Canal Street in downtown New Orleans. At one time, there were more than 20 Gus Mayer stores across the Southeast and Southwest.

The first Birmingham location opened in 1922 in the Retail Block behind the Molton Hotel on 5th Avenue North. Later the store was located at 2240 Highland Avenue in the Bottega Favorita location, now home to Bottega Restaurant & Cafe. Two years after the Brookwood Village mall opened in 1973 the store moved there.

In 1975, when the stores were being sold off individually, the Pizitz family purchased the Birmingham operation and later added the Nashville location. These two are the only remaining Gus Mayer stores today.

In 2002 the Colonial Brookwood Village store was relocated and expanded along with the renovations to the mall. Hambrecht Oleson Design Associates of New York designed the new 21,000-square-foot (2,000 m^{2}) store with local architects Crawford, McWilliams and Hatcher.

The shoe salons at Gus Mayer, which include a full-line Stuart Weitzman boutique and a Cole Haan concept salon, are owned independently by David Kraselsky, who leases the store space.

In 2010 the Gus Mayer at Colonial Brookwood Village made plans to move to The Summit as part of an updating of the store's merchandising strategy sometime around Valentine's Day, 2011. The new 15,000-square-foot (1,400 m^{2}) store was also designed by Hambrecht Oleson. Bayer Properties petitioned the City of Birmingham for $500,000 in tax abatement incentives for the deal.
