= Bellevue, Tennessee =

- Neighborhood
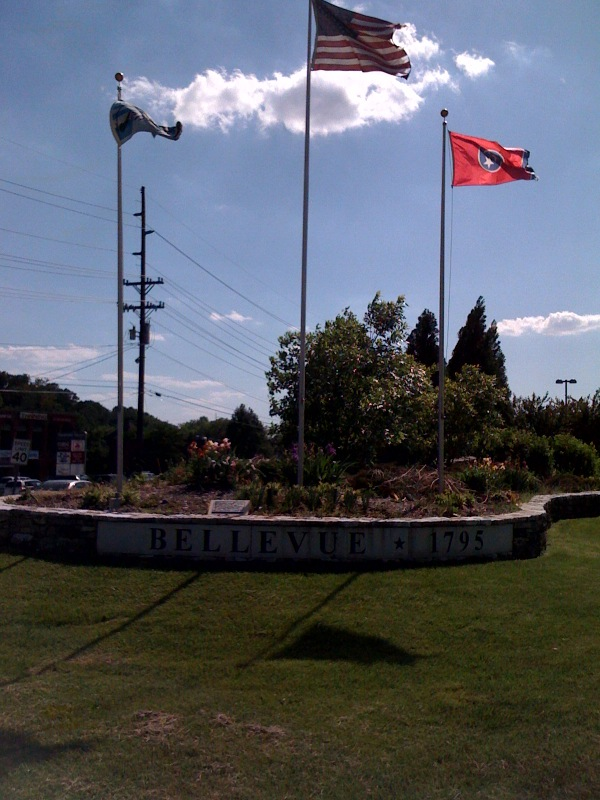

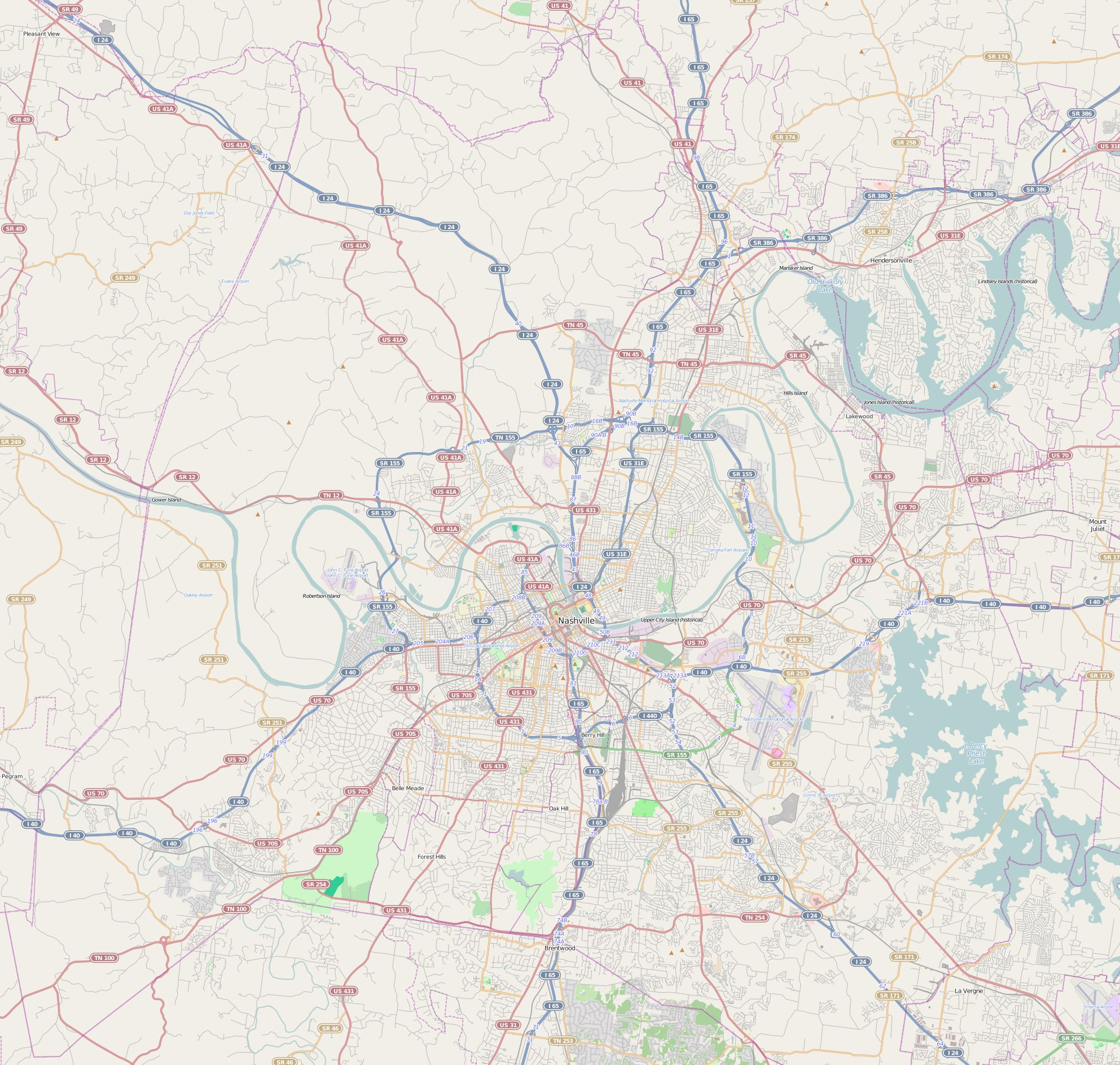
- Location within Nashville
- Coordinates: 36°4′27″N 86°55′24″W
- Country: United States
- State: Tennessee
- County: Davidson
- City: Nashville

Government
  - Councilmember: Sheri Weiner
  - Councilmember: Jason Spain

Population (2013)
  - Total: 79,157
- Time zone: UTC-6 (CST)
  - Summer (DST): UTC-5 (CDT)
- ZIP code: 37221, 37209, 37143
- Area code: 615

Bellevue is a neighborhood of Nashville, situated about 13 miles southwest of the downtown area via Interstate 40. It is served by the Metropolitan Government of Nashville and Davidson County. The 2016 population estimate for Bellevue's two main zip codes was 77,862.

Home to a legally designated "scenic river" segment of the Harpeth River and the massive Warner Parks, Bellevue offers more than 50 acres of park and open space per 1000 residents. It is a popular destination for outdoors and nature lovers, with miles of paved and unpaved trails for hikers and cyclists along the Harpeth River Greenway. Bellevue is also the beginning access point for a multi-state recreational highway known as the Natchez Trace Parkway.

Commercial/retail hotspots in the Bellevue area are near the Highway 70S/I-40 interchange, at the intersection of Highway 70S and Old Hickory Boulevard; and near the intersection of Old Harding Pike and Highway 100. One Bellevue Place is a retail lifestyle center on the property formerly known as Bellevue Center Mall on Highway 70S. This shopping area includes a coffee shop, hotels, and numerous restaurants and retail establishments, anchored by a Sprouts Farmer's Market grocery store, AMC Bellevue 12 theatre, and the Bellevue Community Center and Ford Ice Center.

In the 1950s, Bellevue was a small community which existed primarily to serve the needs of nearby farms. It was mostly along the railroad tracks near the Harpeth River, and had only a few buildings such as a hardware store, post office, and a Masonic lodge hall. I-40 was built through Bellevue in the early 1960s and suburbanization of the community was made official when the United States Postal Service changed the office's designation from "Bellview, Tennessee" to a branch of the Nashville office in the late 1970s.

On May 2, 2010, the Bellevue area was hard-hit by a devastating flood, but in the following decade it rebounded and experienced transformative residential and commercial development.

On February 3, 2014, a passenger plane crashed in the field 30 yards west of the Bellevue YMCA. The four passengers were killed when the plane crashed after experiencing heavy airspeeds and total engine failure.

== Demographics ==
According to the census of 2000, there were 37,062 people and 14,807 households in Bellevue. There were an average of 2.5 persons per household.

In 1990, 76% of people aged 25 or older had a high school education or better. The median income was $40,328.

As of 2016 the population had risen to 77,862.

Notable residents include Ruby Amanfu (recording artist, producer and Grammy, Soul Train and BET Award nominated songwriter), Sam Ashworth (songwriter) (songwriter, producer and recording artist), George Boebecker, Jr. (founder of Crocs), Cecil Branstetter (architect of Metro Nashville Charter and founder of Branstetter, Stranch & Jennings law firm), T. Graham Brown (American country music singer), Luke Combs (American country music artist), Abraham Louis Demoss (Civil War Captain and founder of Bell Vue), Gabe Dixon (keyboard with the Tedeschi Trucks Band, solo artist and former leader of the Gabe Dixon Band), Sylvia Ganier (food policy advocate and founder of Green Door Gourmet farm in Nashville), Bill Evans (saxophonist) (jazz musician who played with Miles Davis and others), Emerson Hart (lead singer of Tonic (band)), Scott Hendricks (record producer), Rasa Hows (builder of Hows-Madden House), Jet Jurgensmeyer (actor/singer), Winston Justice (investment advisor and former NFL player), Noah Liff (businessman and namesake benefactor of Noah Liff Opera Center, home of the Nashville Opera), Col. Littleton (founder of Col. Littleton Leather), Carrie McDowell (child performer and 1980s pop singer), Bo Mitchell (Tennessee Representative), Charlie Peacock (producer and recording artist), Henry Rollins (storyteller, writer, singer and former member of Black Flag), Brenda Stein (wood working artist), Jane Branstetter Stranch (U.S. Court of Appeals Judge), Sylvain Sylvain (rock guitarist and member of the New York Dolls), Bill Wade (former NFL Player), Laura Weber White (country fiddler), Lainey Wilson (songwriter and recording artist), and Jeff Zentner (fiction author).

== Bellevue Public Library ==
Bellevue's first library service was via bookmobile during World War II. The Bellevue Public Library opened in 1984 in the old woodshop/agriculture classroom building of the original Bellevue High School, built in 1931 and torn down in 1981 when the new Bellevue High School was built on the other side of Colice Jeanne Road. The former gymnasium at the back of the school became part of the Bellevue Community Center. Both the woodshop/agriculture building and the gymnasium were added in the 1950s.

The new Bellevue Branch Library opened in January, 2015. The new Bellevue Branch features a children's area, teen area, computer space, café style coffee and vending area as well as meeting room space.

== Red Caboose Park ==
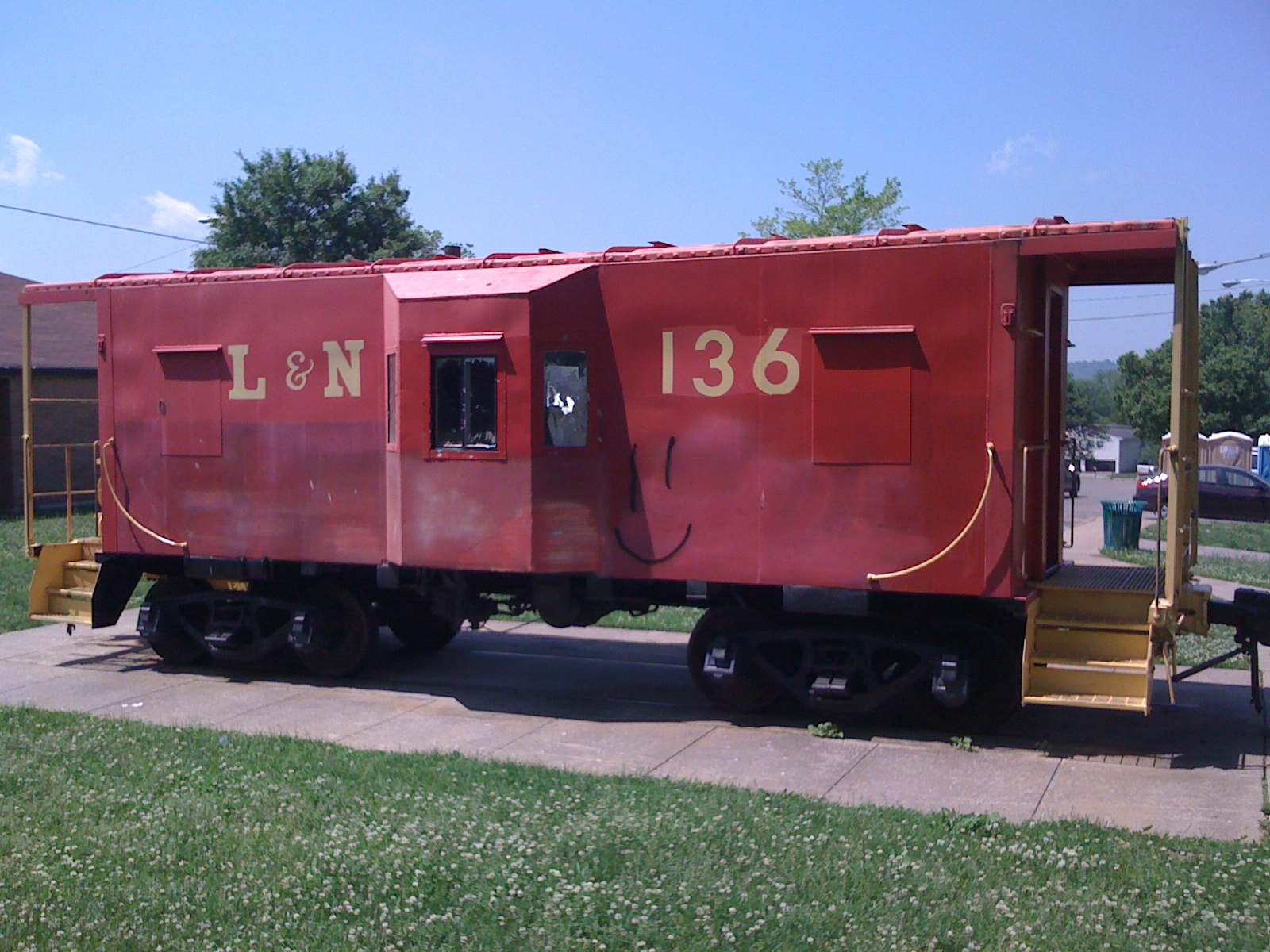
The red caboose of Bellevue Park.

Bellevue Park is located on Colice Jeanne Road in Bellevue across from Bellevue Middle School and next to the Bellevue Branch Library. It is part of the Metro Nashville Parks System. The park is more commonly referred to as Red Caboose Park by locals due to the red caboose that sits on site. On April 1, 2025, Metro Nashville Parks Board approved a name change to officially rename the park as Red Caboose Park, although updated signage and public facing evidence of the name change are not yet apparent. The park also has a log cabin (which was built by the town's founder, Abraham Louis Demoss, prior to 1800, and moved to the park from its original location a couple of miles away in about 2005) onsite. The park features an exercise path for walkers and joggers, as well as a playground originally built by community volunteers in 1996 as part of the Bellevue Bicentennial Celebration. The original playground was replaced with a more modern, fenced playground in 2019. The update was driven by growing maintenance costs of the original, wooden playground as well as an effort to provide enhanced accessibility to play equipment.

Red Caboose Park is the site of the annual Bellevue Community Picnic, which attracts around 20,000 people each year.

== Schools ==
=== Gower Elementary School ===
Gower Elementary was built in 1989 and teaches grades preK-4 and is part of the "Hillwood Cluster". It is located off of I-40 at 650 Old Hickory Boulevard in Bellevue, Nashville, Tennessee. The immediate area was formerly known as the "Gower" or "Gower School" community. The school's enrollment is currently [2014] approximately 650 students.

=== Harpeth Valley Elementary School ===
Harpeth Valley Elementary School was founded in 1939 and teaches grades PreK-4. It is located on the outskirts of Bellevue along State Route 100. The current school was built in 1996 and has enrollment of more than 700 students. Harpeth Valley Elementary School was the inspiration for the title of the hit country song "Harper Valley PTA".

=== Bellevue Middle School ===
Bellevue Middle School is located in the heart of the town on Colice Jeanne Road with the students coming primarily from Bellevue and the immediate surrounding areas. It was founded in 1970 and teaches grades 5 through 8. At the site of the former Bellevue High School, the school was renovated in 2002 and has an enrollment of 680 students.

=== James Lawson High School ===
In Fall 2023, James Lawson High School, a state-of-the-art $140 million, 310,000 square foot educational facility on a 273-acre natural setting tucked off Highway 70S in Bellevue, opened.

=== Private Schools ===
- Nashville Christian School
- Ensworth High School

== Athletics ==
Bellevue is the home of The Bellevue Steelers of the Tennessee Youth Football Alliance, who have been a part of the Bellevue community since 1977. Bellevue is also home of BSAA, Inc. at the Reese Smith Jr. Baseball & Softball Park, which includes Babe Ruth League and Cal Ripken Jr. League Baseball. Thousands of Bellevue's youth have played baseball here from tee ball through high school. The BBA Youth Basketball program also makes its home in Bellevue. The Bellevue Basketball Association has offered a Youth Sports Basketball program to tens of thousands of Nashville's youth since the 1970s. The Harpeth Youth Soccer Association (HYSA) was founded in 1989 in Bellevue. More than 2,000 youth participate in the soccer league each year. The HYSA complex, located on Coley Davis Drive was decimated by the May 2010 Tennessee floods, but reopened in 2011.
