= Electronic Express =

- Company type: Privately held company
- Industry: Retail
- Founded: 1983; 43 years ago
- Headquarters: Nashville, Tennessee, United States
- Number of locations: 23
- Products: Consumer Electronics, home appliance
- Number of employees: 350 (2016)
- Website: electronicexpress.com

Electronic Express is an American family owned and operated business established in 1983 and headquartered in Nashville, Tennessee. It is the largest independent consumer electronics and major appliances retailer in Tennessee. Electronic Express operates 20 stores in Tennessee and Alabama, and in 1999 began online sales.

== History ==
Electronic Express was founded in 1983 inside a small 80 sq ft retail space within Harding Mall in Nashville, TN. The first store sold small electronics such as portable CD players, telephones, and boom boxes before expanding to a larger floor plan with more inventory.

In 2003, Electronic Express became the 12th member of NATM Buying Corporation, the leading buying group for regional retailers in the appliance and electronics industry.

Electronic Express began carrying major appliances in 2008 with the opening of its Cool Springs, Tennessee store.

After the 2009 closure of Circuit City, Electronic Express purchased three of the chain's former locations, including two 20,000 sq ft “The City” format stores in Spring Hill, TN and Cleveland, TN.

Electronic Express began carrying mattresses in 2011 in a single store before slowly adding mattresses to more stores.

In 2011, Electronic Express opened its first store outside of the Middle Tennessee region in Cleveland, TN, and in 2013 opened its first store outside of Tennessee in Decatur, AL in the Decatur Mall.

In November 2015, Electronic Express opened its first stand-alone appliance center adjacent to their Hermitage, TN location. It features a standard appliance inventory and has numerous kitchenettes displaying appliances as they would appear in a home kitchen.

A new Electronic Express store opened in 2017 in the Oak Ridge City Center in Oak Ridge, TN.

In 2019, Electronic Express expanded in the Alabama region with the opening of two new locations: Huntsville and Florence.

In 2020, Electronic Express opened two new stores in middle and Eastern Tennessee. The Chattanooga store opened up in May 2020 in the Hamilton Place shopping district. The 2nd store opened within the Opry Mills Mall as an outlet store in October 2020.
