= CoolSprings Galleria =

Shopping mall in Franklin, Tennessee, U.S.

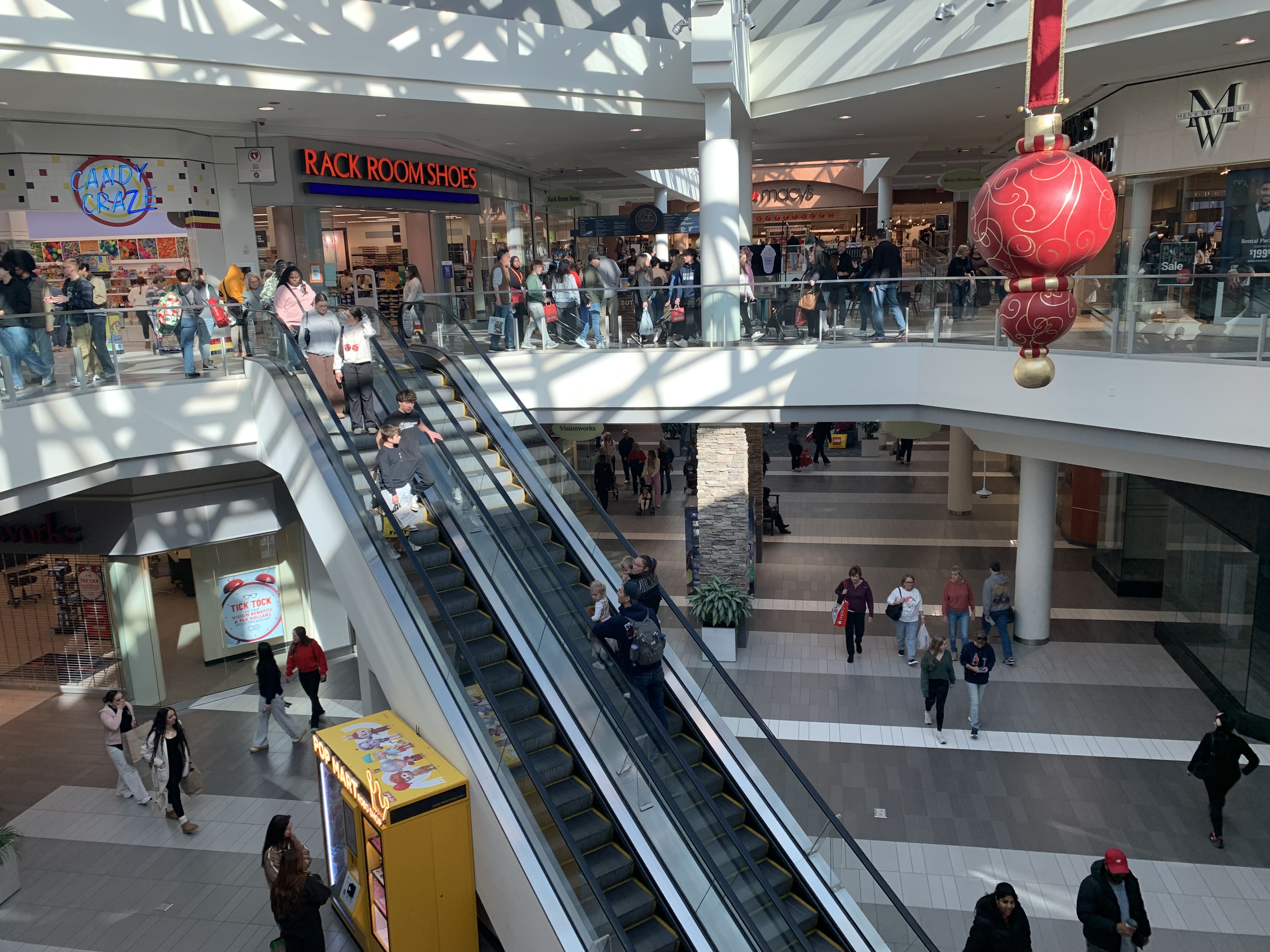
- Northern concourse (November 2025)
- Location: Franklin, Tennessee, U.S.
- Coordinates: 35°57′26″N 86°48′50″W
- Address: 1800 Galleria Boulevard
- Opened: August 7, 1991; 35 years ago
- Developer: CBL & Associates Properties and Edward J. DeBartolo Corporation
- Manager: CBL Properties
- Owner: CBL Properties and TIAA-CREF
- Num. of stores: 150
- Num. of anchor tenants: 9
- Floor area: 1,166,284 square feet (108,351 m^{2})
- Floors: 2
- Parking: 6,500 spaces
- Website: www.coolspringsgalleria.com

CoolSprings Galleria is an enclosed super-regional shopping mall in the Cool Springs commercial and residential corridor between Franklin and Brentwood, Tennessee, 15 miles (24 km) south of Nashville, Tennessee, United States. Opened in 1991, it features 150 stores. The mall's anchor stores are Belk, Dillard's, JCPenney, and Macy's, with other major tenants including American Girl, The Cheesecake Factory, H&M, Primark, and Ulta Beauty. CBL Properties developed the mall in a joint venture with the Edward J. DeBartolo Corporation, and has owned it since its opening; CBL also owns an adjacent power center called CoolSprings Crossing which was developed simultaneously.

== History ==
CBL & Associates Properties (now CBL Properties), a shopping mall developer based in Chattanooga, Tennessee, first announced plans to build a shopping mall in Franklin, Tennessee, in 1989. It would be situated at the interchange of Interstate 65 and Moores Lane (Tennessee State Route 441). CBL developed the mall through a joint venture with the Edward J. DeBartolo Corporation. The original plans for the mall included three anchor stores: Castner Knott (later became Proffitt's/Hecht's/Macy's), and Sears, with additional space for up to two more. Overall it would feature nearly 200 stores in over 1,000,000 square feet (93,000 m^{2}) of retail space. Coinciding with development of the mall, three other stores were confirmed for the surrounding area: Target and Service Merchandise at an adjacent power center called CoolSprings Crossing, and The Home Depot across Interstate 65.

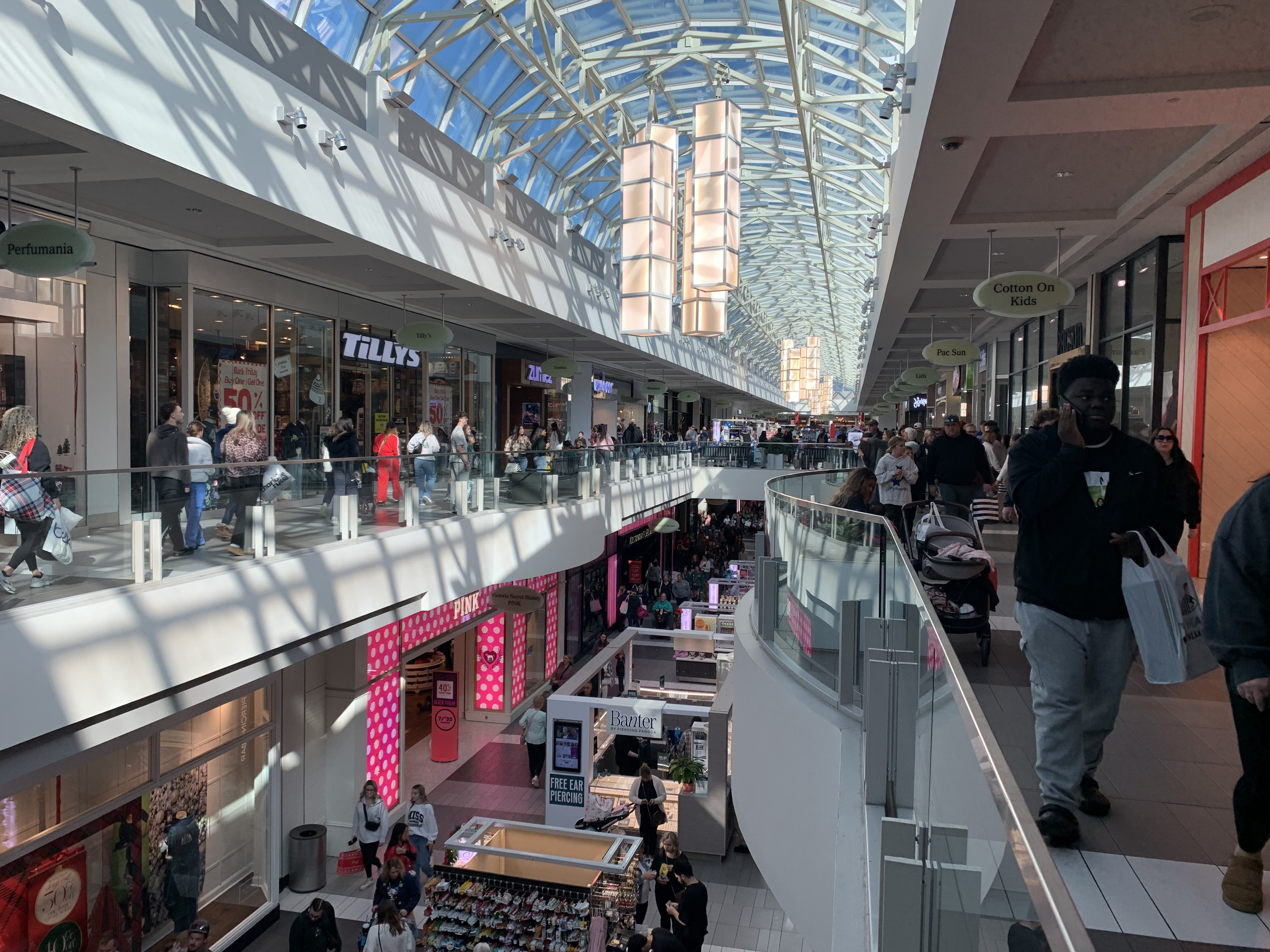
The mall's main concourse in 2025, on the upper level looking north toward Macy's

Entrance to Belk

CoolSprings Galleria opened on August 7, 1991, with Castner Knott, Dillard’s, and Sears as anchors. The mall was over 1.3 million square feet in size and an estimated 70,000 to 80,000 people visited the mall on opening day. JCPenney would open in the following years and on October 24, 1994, Parisian opened a location at the mall, becoming the fifth anchor store.

In May 2011, it was announced that TIAA-CREF would receive 50% ownership of the mall and several other CBL malls in an attempt to reduce CBL's debt. Sears closed its store there in 2013 and sold it to CBL, who redeveloped the space and surrounding site.

On July 1, 2026, it was announced that JCPenney would be closing in the Fall after its lease is expired, and would be replaced by Dick's House of Sport that would be opening in early 2028.
