= The Avenue Murfreesboro =

Coordinates: 35.8584°N 86.4452°W

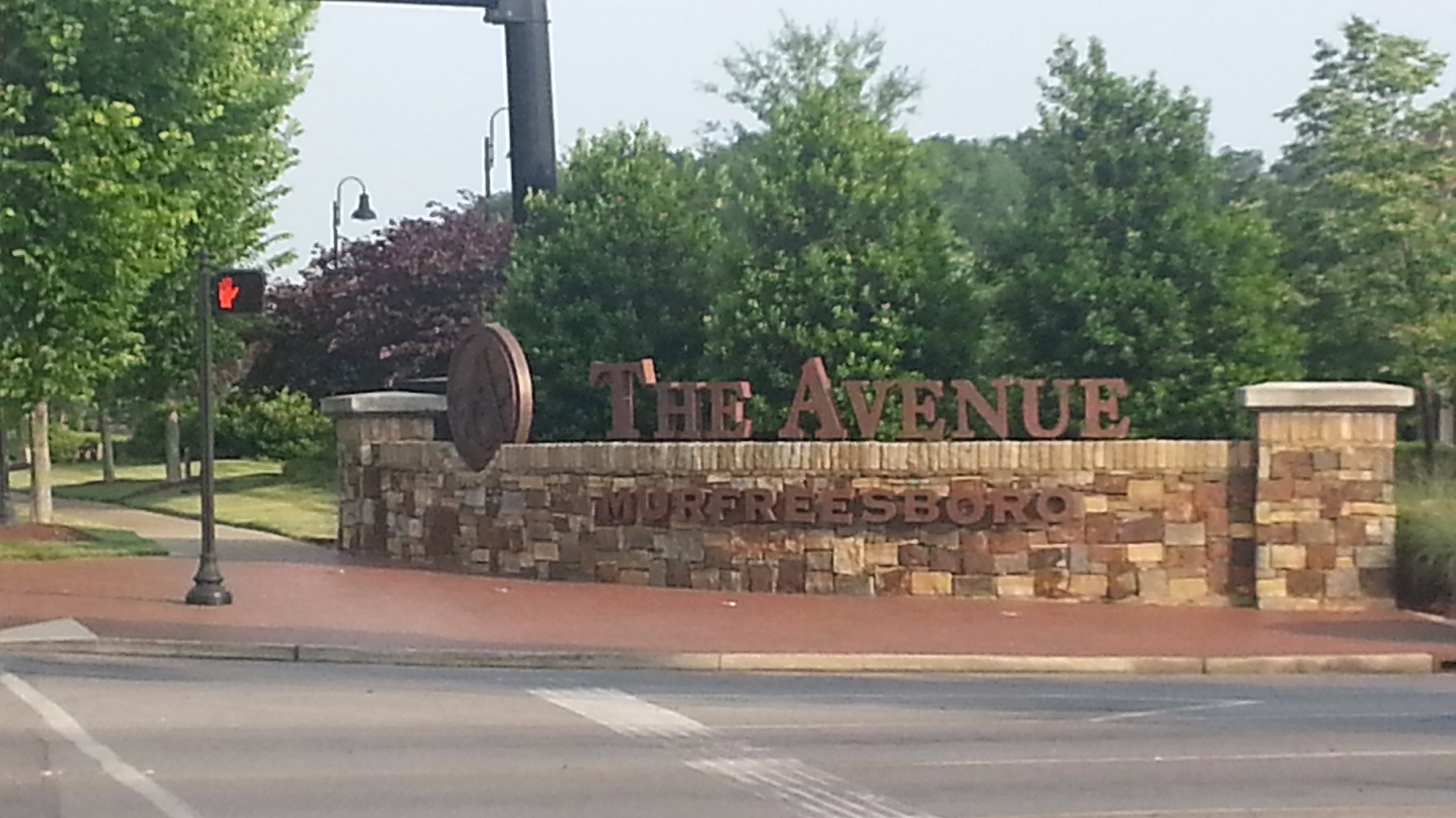
- Main entrance to the shopping complex
- Address: 2615 Medical Center Pkwy; Murfreesboro, Tennessee; United States
- Opened: October 17, 2007
- Developer: Cousins Properties & Faison Enterprises
- Owner: Hines Global REIT Inc.
- Num. of stores: 110
- Floor area: 811,000 sq ft (75,300 m^{2}) GLA
- Public transit: West Side Loop, Murfreesboro Rover
- Website: Official website

The Avenue Murfreesboro is an open-air regional lifestyle shopping center in Murfreesboro, Tennessee, located 27 miles (43 km) southeast of downtown Nashville. More than one hundred stores reside within the complex.

Construction of The Avenue began in July 2006, and the first phase of development opened on October 17, 2007, with 660,000 square feet (61,000 m^{2}) of retail space available. A second phase completed the center with a total of 811,000 square feet (75,300 m^{2}) at US$140 million.

The Avenue was jointly developed and operated by Cousins Properties and Faison Enterprises; however, in August 2013 The Avenue was sold to Houston-based Hines Global REIT Inc. for US$163 million. This was a record price for an open-air, non-mall in Tennessee.

As of June 30, 2013, eighty-five percent of the space had been leased.

== See also ==
- List of shopping malls in Tennessee
