= Centennial Sportsplex =

Sports venue in Nashville, Tennessee

Coordinates: 36°9′1″N 86°48′32″W

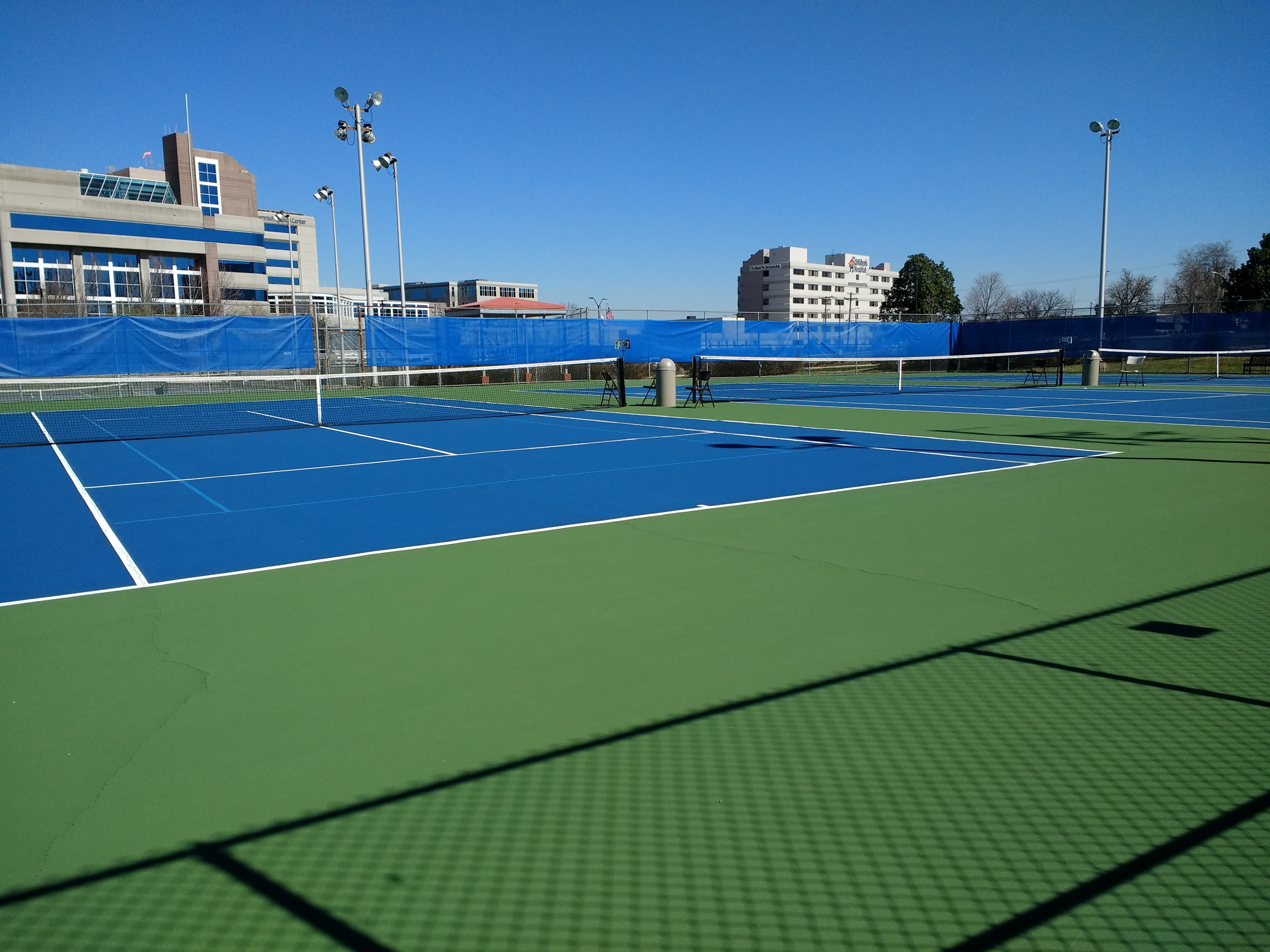
Tennis courts at Centennial Sportsplex

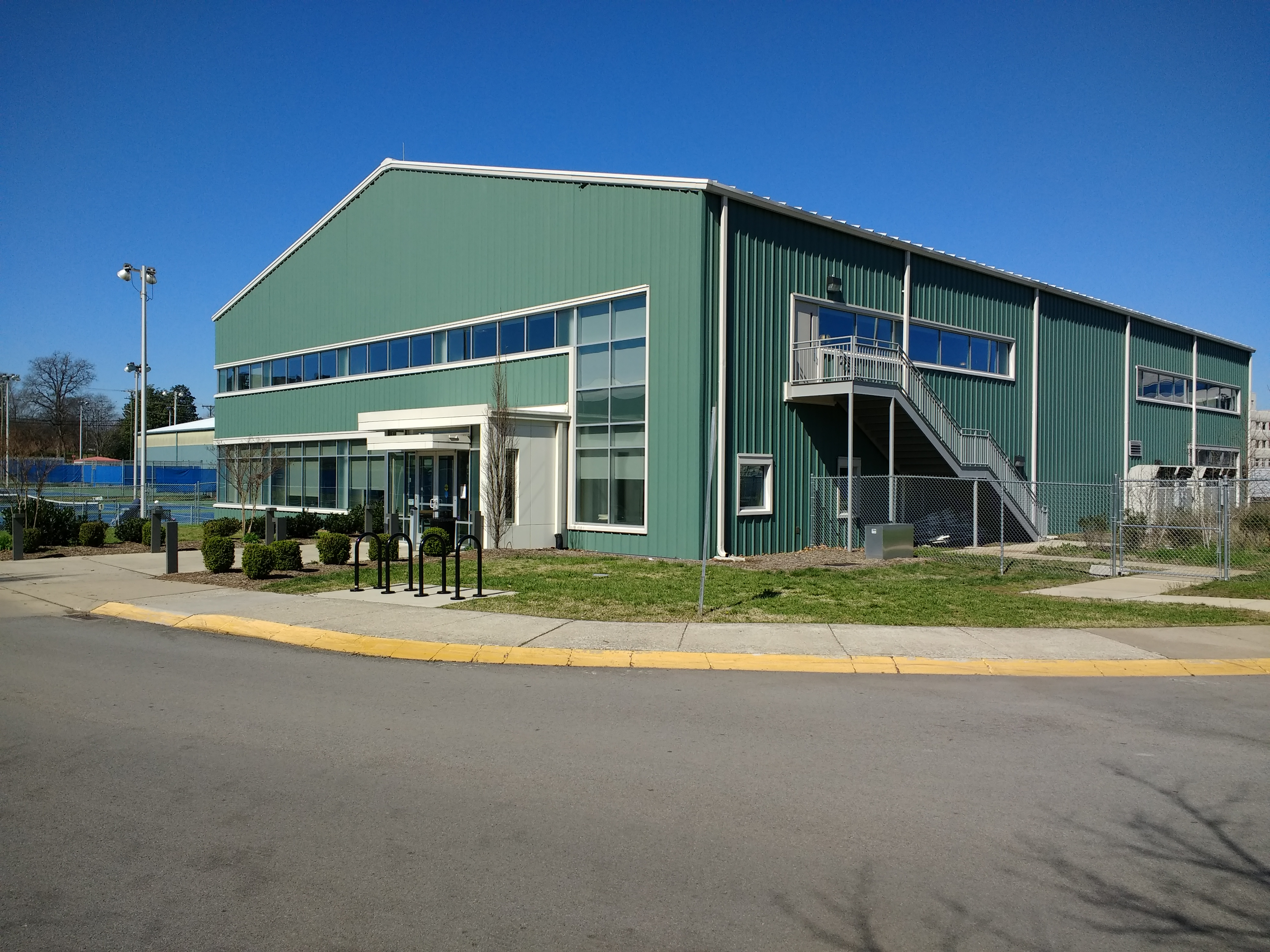
Fitness and Tennis Center

Centennial Sportsplex is a multi-use athletic complex in Nashville, Tennessee. The venue is owned by the Metropolitan Government of Nashville and Davidson County and is operated by Metro Parks, the parks and recreation arm of the government.

The facility is adjacent to Centennial Park, from which it derives its name. It currently features two ice arenas, an Olympic-size swimming pool, a fitness center, and several tennis courts.

The ice arenas are occasionally opened to the public for skating, but are primarily used for organized ice hockey. The west arena is used as the practice facility for the National Hockey League's Nashville Predators. Both arenas also regularly hold youth, high school, college, and club hockey contests. A small hockey equipment store is also located on-site.

Numerous athletic education programs are offered, including classes teaching swimming, aerobics, figure skating, tennis, among others.

Though it is owned by the Metro government, those wishing to use the facility must purchase memberships or "visit passes". Memberships are discounted for residents of Metro Nashville/Davidson County.

It is home to the Nashville Aquatic Club, a swim club. NAC is a USA-Swimming Gold Medal Club that runs programs at the Sportsplex and at the Williamson County Indoor Sports Complex in Brentwood, TN.

== History ==
The land for the Sportsplex was acquired by Metro Parks from Hospital Corporation of America in a 1987 land swap. The facility first opened in 1990 and was expanded and renovated in 1998 and 1999 with the arrival of the Predators.
