= The Mall at Green Hills =

Shopping mall in Tennessee

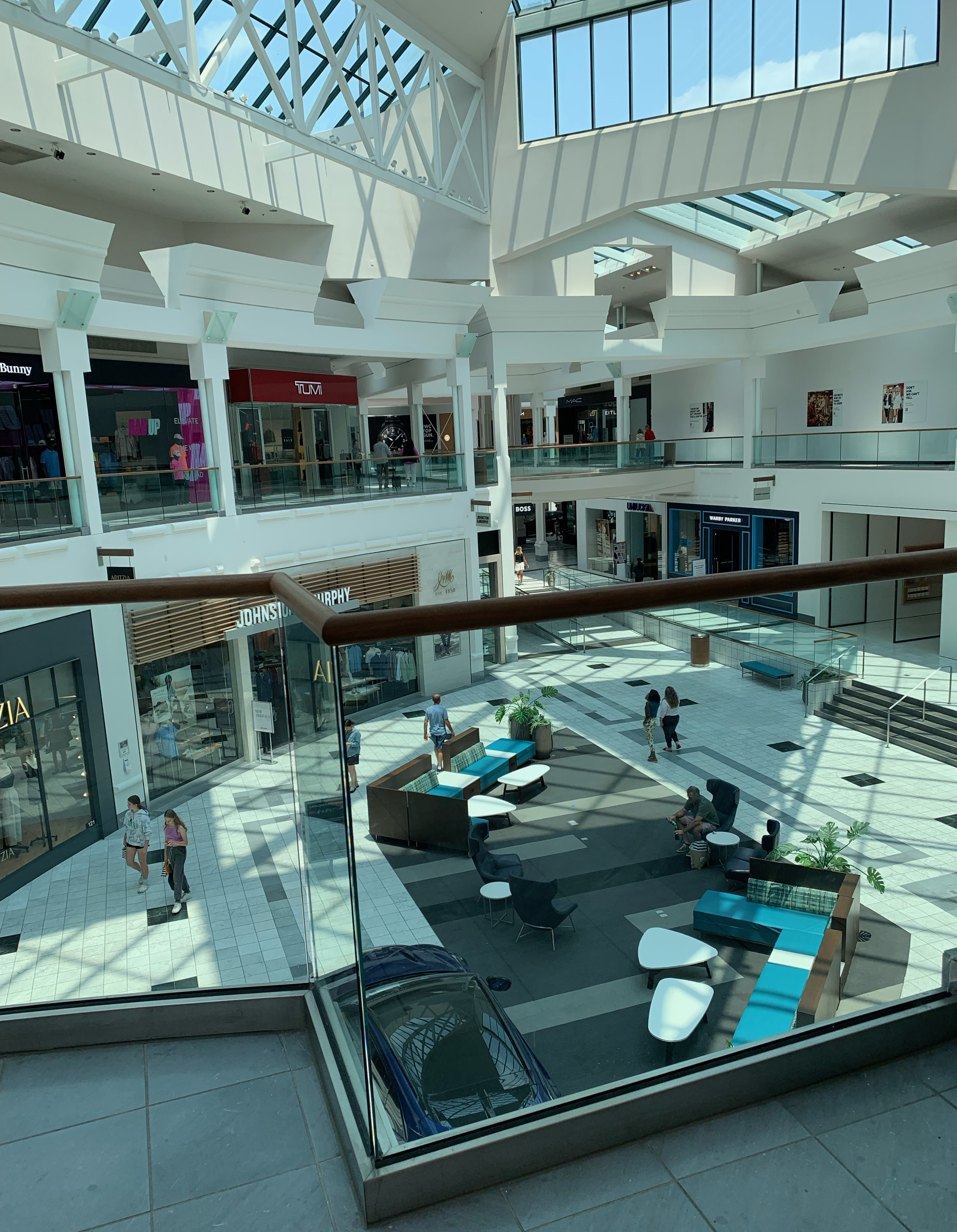
- Interior of The Mall at Green Hills, June 2023.
- Location: Nashville, Tennessee, U.S.
- Coordinates: 36.107422°N 86.815403°W
- Address: 2126 Abbott Martin Road
- Opened: 1955; 71 years ago
- Developer: William C. Weaver Jr. and W.H. Criswell
- Manager: Simon Property Group
- Owner: Simon Property Group
- Architect: Hart Freeland and Roberts
- Num. of stores: 100
- Num. of anchor tenants: 3
- Floor area: 1,053,000 square feet (97,800 m^{2}) (GLA)
- Floors: 2 (3 in Nordstrom and Macy's)
- Website: www.simon.com/mall/the-mall-at-green-hills

The Mall at Green Hills, originally Green Hills Village, is a shopping mall located in Nashville, Tennessee, United States. The mall has more than 100 stores and restaurants on two main floors totaling 1,053,000 square feet (97,800 m^{2}). Nordstrom, Dillard's, and Macy's are the anchor stores. The mall is owned and managed by Simon Property Group, which completed a 100% buyout of the previous owner and manager, Taubman Centers in November 2025.

== History ==
William C. Weaver Jr. and W.H. Criswell, two real estate developers from Nashville, Tennessee, first proposed to build Green Hills Village in 1953. Their plans called for a 25-store shopping mall. The firms selected a site along Hillsboro Pike (US 431) and Abbott Martin Road, an area which their research determined had the most population growth between 1940 and 1950. The original plans were for a 135,000-square-foot (12,500 m^{2}) strip mall with Castner Knott and Gus Mayer department stores. Other tenants included Woolworth and Kroger.

The mall has undergone several renovations and expansions since its opening in 1955 as an open-air strip mall. The original layout contained 112,400 square feet (10,442 square meters) of retail space and included Woolworth and Walgreens. Cain-Sloan (which became Dillard's in 1987) opened a stand-alone store at the west end of the mall.

In 1998, a new development emerged adjacent to the mall, a Regal Cinemas 16-screen megaplex. Regal also opened an indoor amusement park, "FunScape", which closed in 2000 when Regal pulled the plug on the concept. Castner Knott became Proffitt's, and later Hecht's.

A new Hecht's store was built in 2004. Hecht's became Macy's in 2006.

A brand new Nordstrom store, Tennessee's first, opened in 2011 next to Dillard's at the mall's entrance facing Abbott Martin Road.

In 2013, an addition to the mall was announced that would include a new, larger Dillard’s store, as well as 125,000 square feet of new retail space. The project was completed by March 2017, when the new Dillard’s location celebrated their grand opening. The old building was promptly demolished.

In February 2026, Simon announced plans to renovate The Mall at Green Hills and two other centers as part of a $250 million investment.

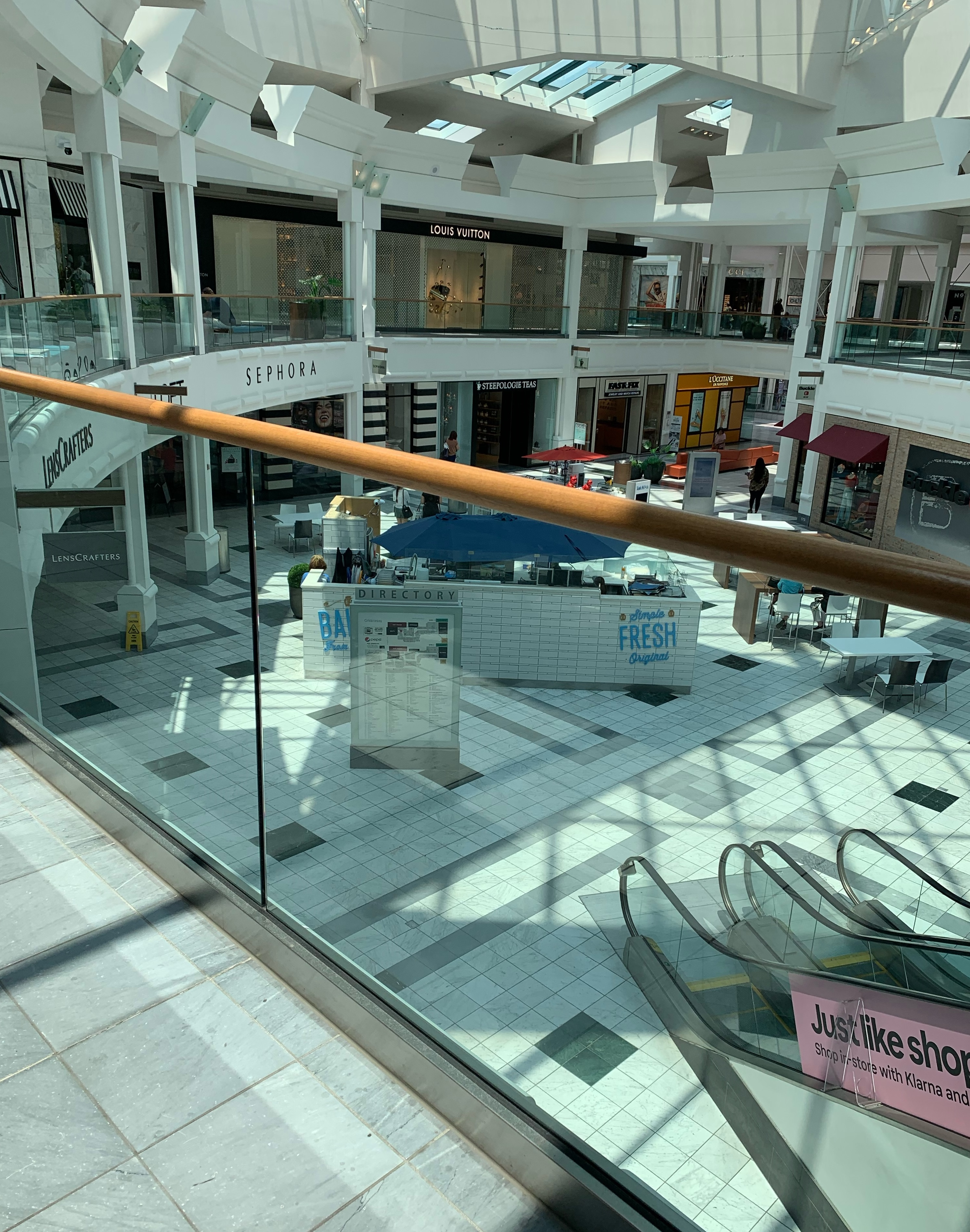
An interior view of The Mall at Green Hills, June 2023.

== See also ==
List of shopping malls in Tennessee
