= Indian Lake Village =

Coordinates: 36.326°N 86.596°W

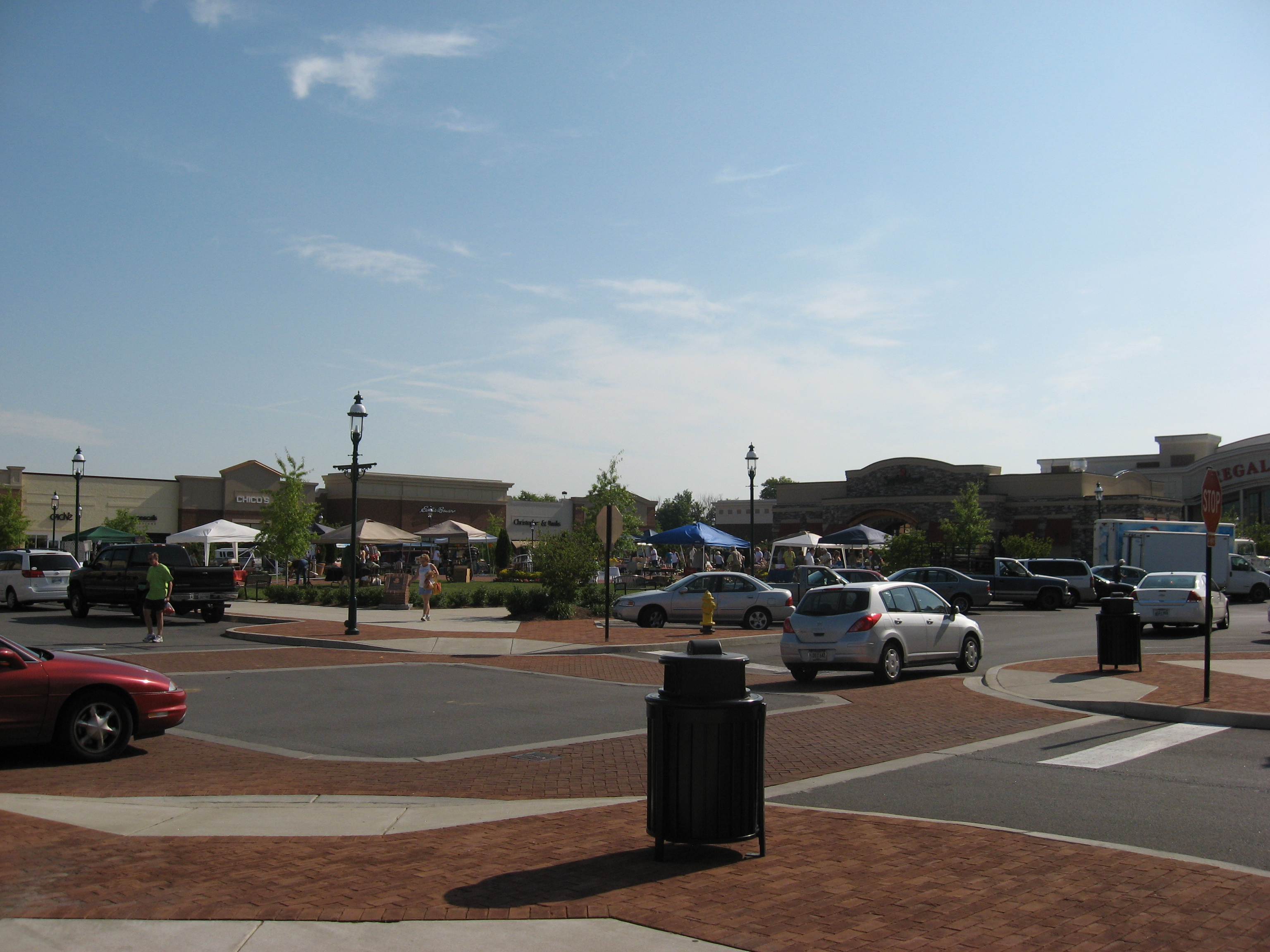
Streets of Indian Lake shopping area

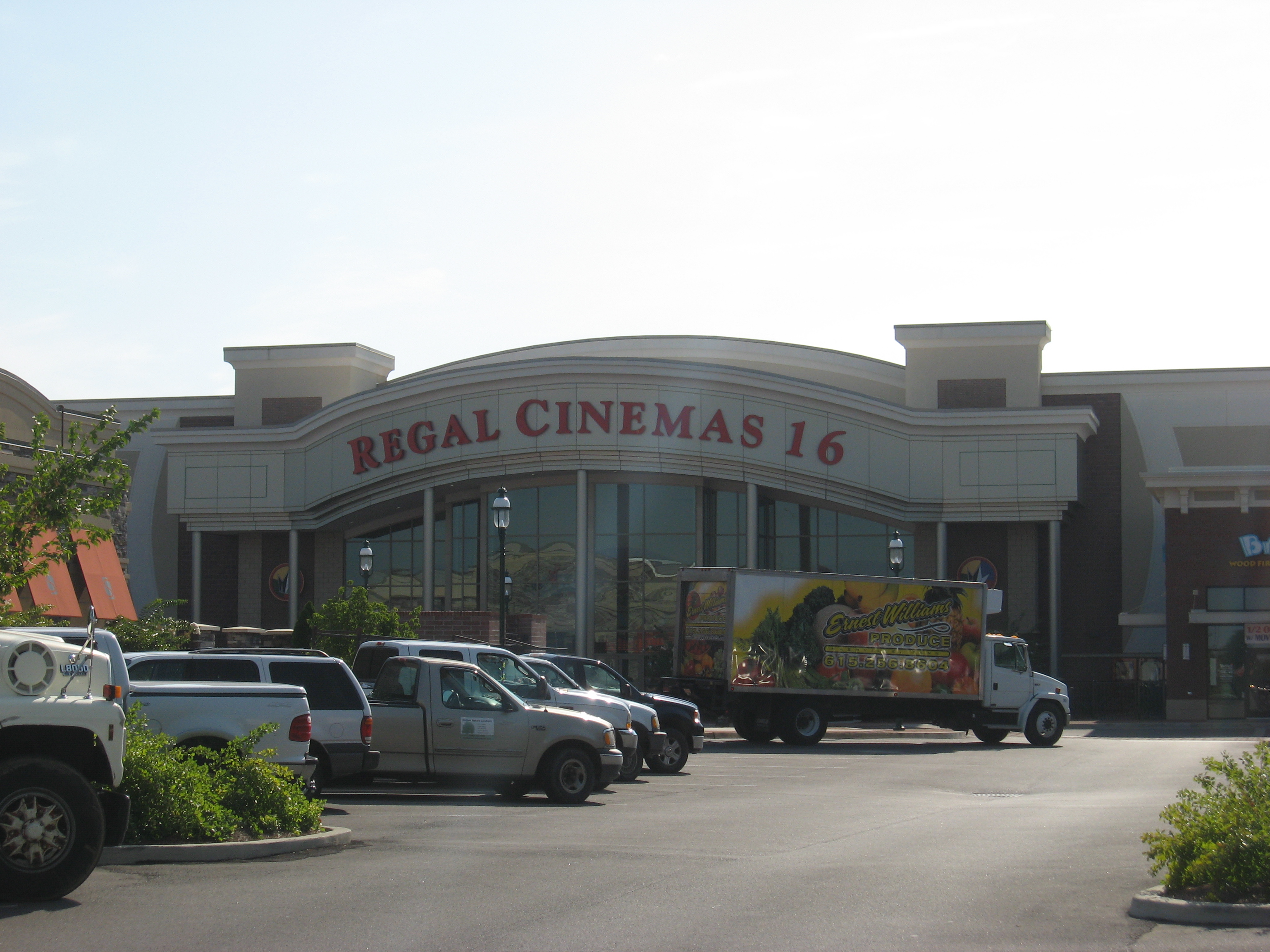
Regal Cinemas at Indian Lake

Indian Lake Village is an upscale retail, office, and residential development located in Hendersonville, Tennessee, United States. The 256-acre (104 ha) development was developed by Halo Properties, and the first phase opened in 2008. Indian Lake Village includes the Streets of Indian Lake, a 500,000 square feet (46,000 m^{2}) square foot outdoor shopping center developed by Continental Real Estate Cos.
