= Cool Springs, Tennessee =

Commercial center in Franklin, Tennessee, US

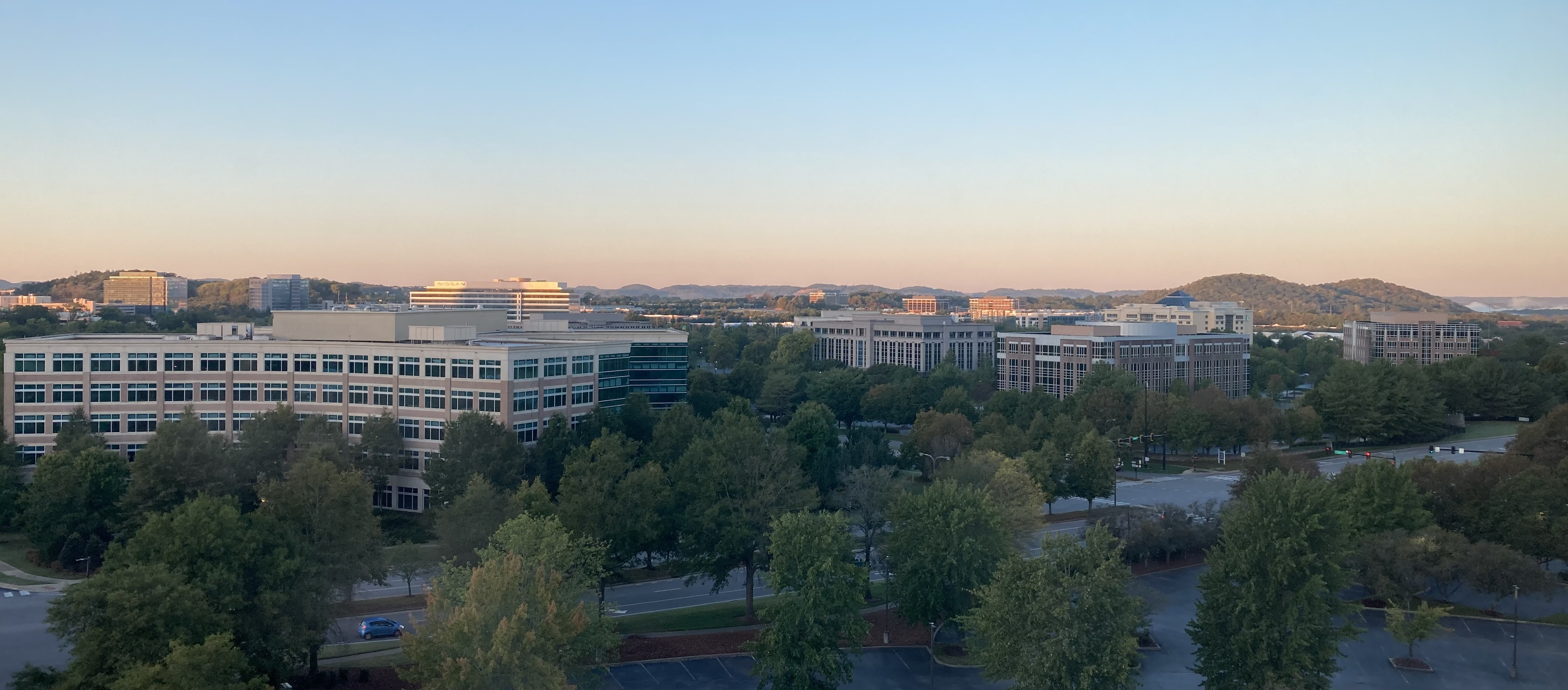
The Cool Springs skyline at dawn

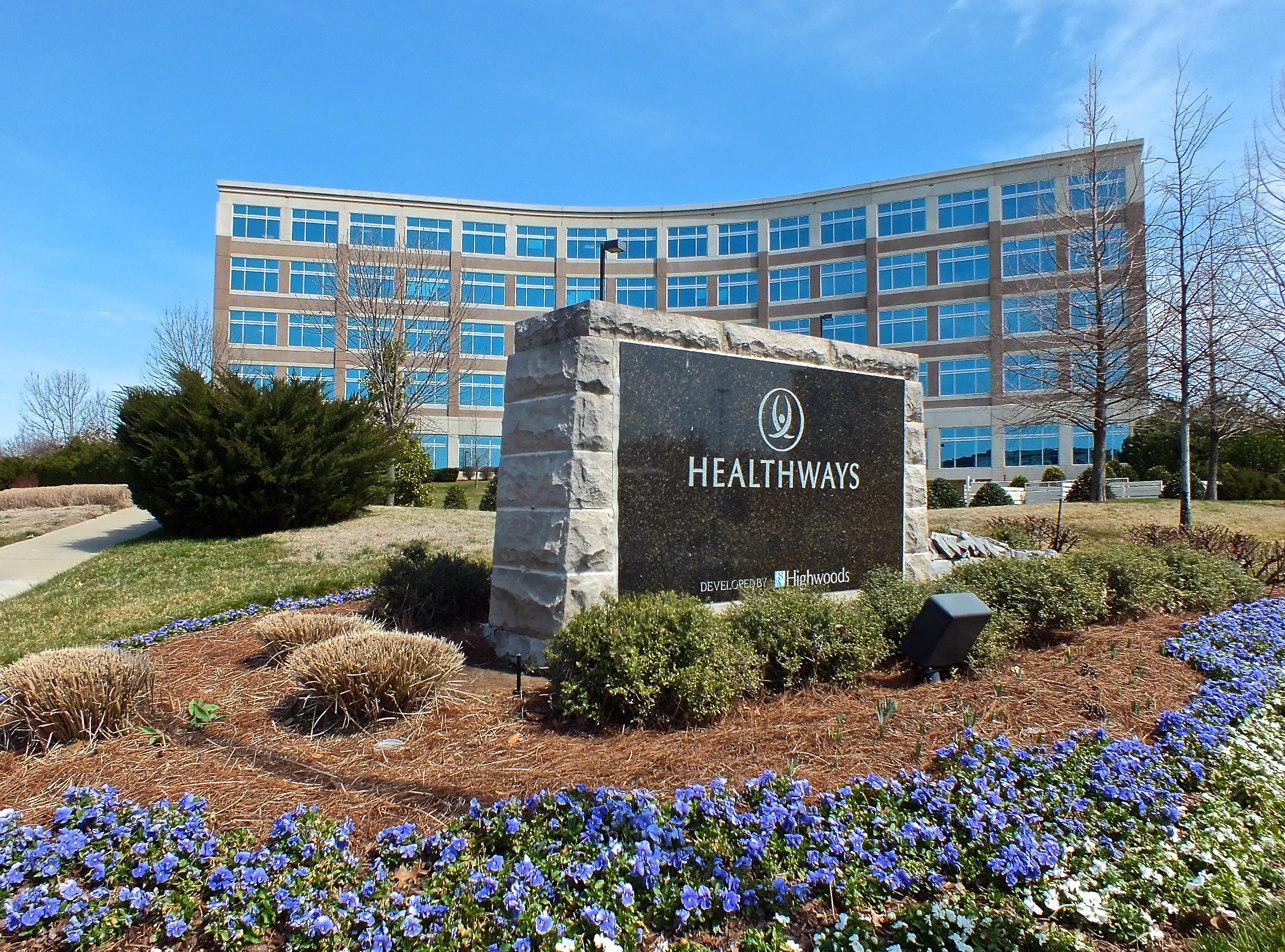
A corporate office building in Cool Springs

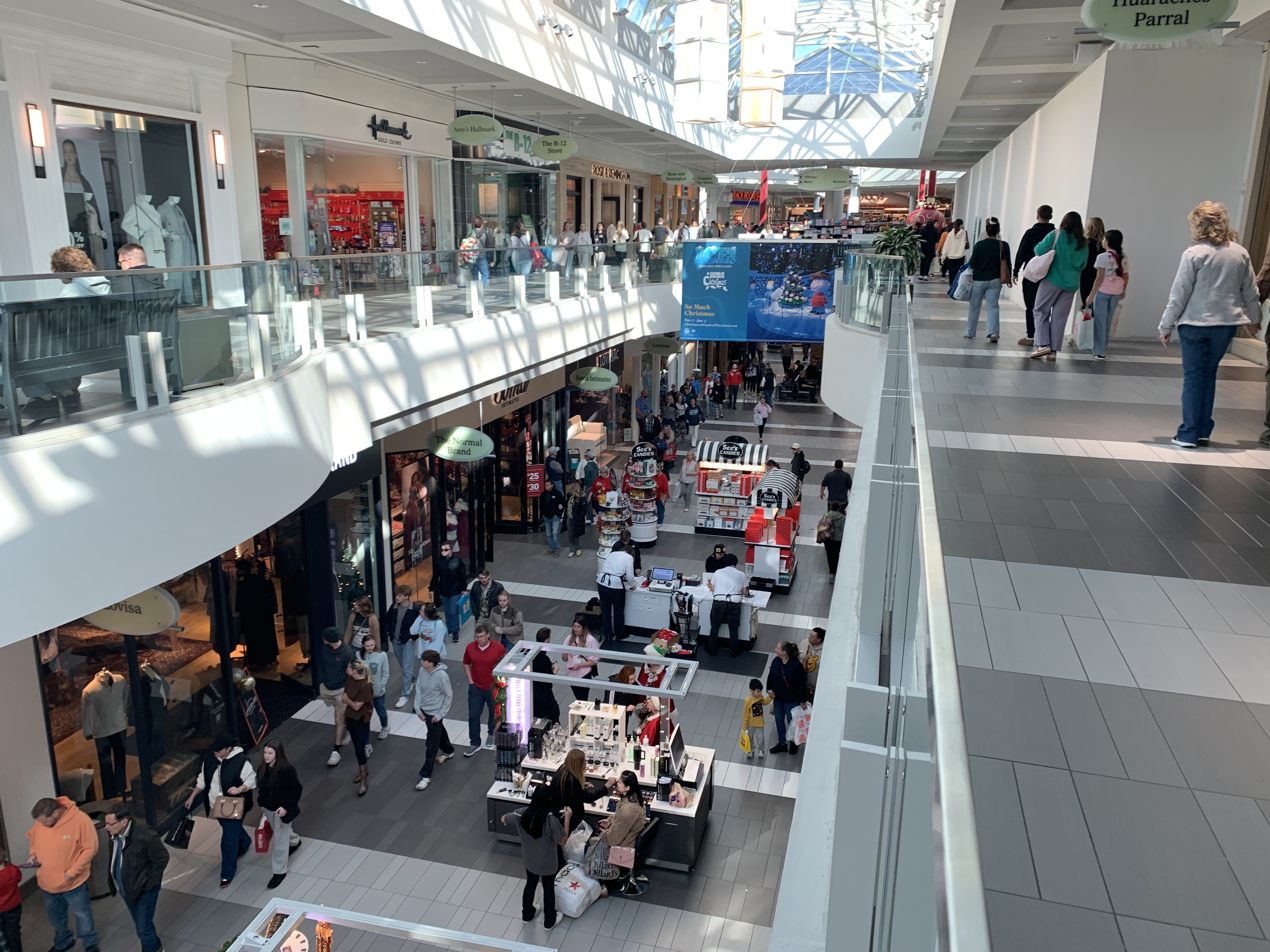
The CoolSprings Galleria mall

Cool Springs is a major commercial center located in Williamson County, Tennessee. Northern portions of Cool Springs fall within the city limits of Brentwood, while the rest is under the jurisdiction of Franklin. This center also serves the southern portions of the Nashville metropolitan area, such as southern Nashville, Nolensville, Thompson's Station, and Spring Hill.

== History ==
This commercial center has developed around the Cool Springs Galleria shopping mall, which opened in August 1991. The center encompasses land on both sides of Interstate 65; it includes a range of businesses: several luxury hotels, strip malls, business parks, mid-rise office buildings, big-box retailers, low-rise apartments, condominiums, restaurants, and car dealerships. Cool Springs is bordered by Brentwood to the North and Franklin to the South.

It is bordered by Mack C. Hatcher Parkway to the west, Carothers Parkway to the east, Moore's Lane to the north, and Liberty Pike to the south. The main roads through the area are Cool Springs Boulevard and Mallory Lane. Traffic has been recorded on these roads of more than 33,000 and 20,000 cars daily, respectively.

The Cool Springs area is home to many major companies, including Tivity Health, Nissan North America, MedSolutions, UBS, CKE Restaurants, Community Health Systems, Mars, and Tasti D-Lite. The center has more than 200 restaurants, ranging from fast food to high end.
