= Castner Knott =

US department store chain

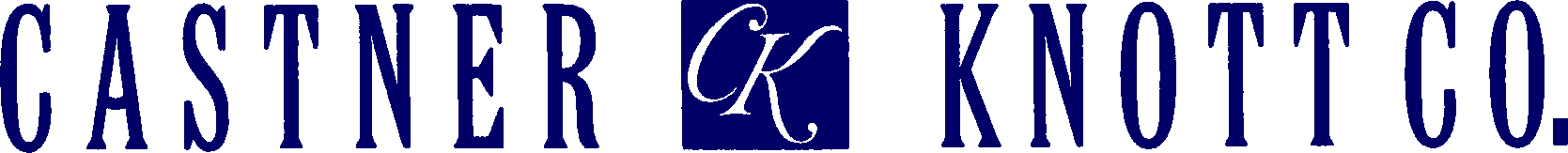
Castner Knott logo.

Castner Knott was a Nashville, Tennessee-based regional department store chain which operated stores in Alabama, Kentucky, and Tennessee. The chain was in business for a century from 1898 to 1998, in its later years as a division of Mercantile Stores Company.

Castner Knott's historic flagship location on Nashville's Church Street closed in 1996, while the remaining stores were among those sold to Little Rock, Arkansas-based Dillard's, when it acquired Mercantile in 1998. The five high-volume mall stores (Bellevue Center, CoolSprings Galleria, Hickory Hollow Mall, The Mall at Green Hills and Rivergate Mall) in the greater Nashville area, where Dillard's already had locations, were sold to Proffitt's. The stores were then sold again in 2001 to May Company, who, in turn, rebranded these locations as Hecht's. In 2006, those stores were converted to the Macy's name as a result of the May Company-Federated Department Stores merger. Macy's would eventually close the Bellevue Center and Hickory Hollow Mall locations, following the decline of those malls as a whole.

The original Castner-Knott Company building, located in downtown Nashville, was sold to Shmerling Clearbrook Holdings in the late 1990s for roughly $1.5 million. On February 3, 2020, the building and adjoining parking garage was sold to a New York real estate firm for $27.2 million.

== See also ==
- List of department stores converted to Macy's
- List of defunct department stores of the United States
