= Rodney N. Powell =

American physician

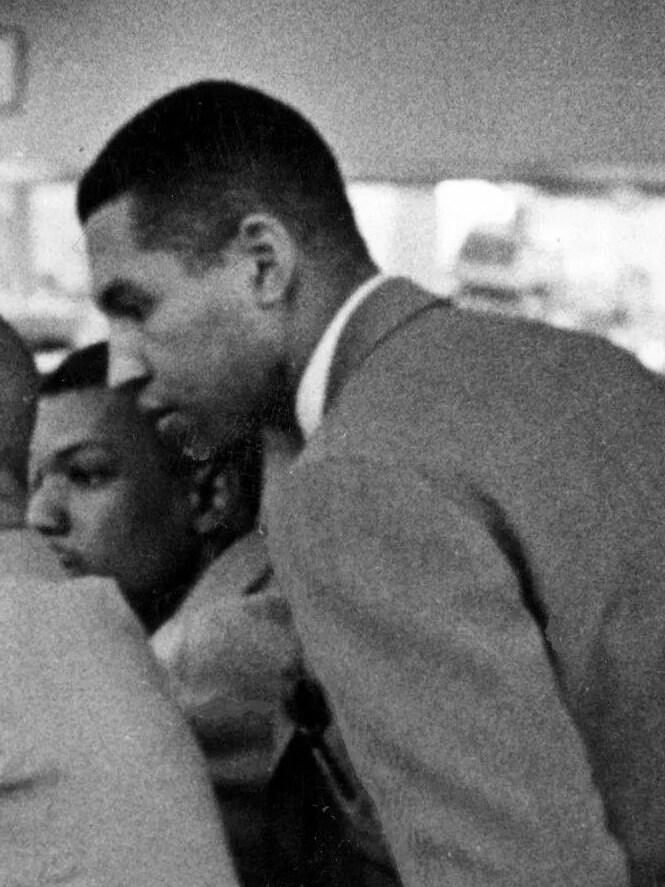
- Powell at a 1960 Nashville sit-in
- Born: 1935 (age 90–91); Philadelphia, Pennsylvania, USA
- Education: Saint Joseph's University; Meharry Medical College
- Known for: LGBTQ rights and Civil Rights advocacy
- Spouse: Gloria Johnson (div. 1975)
- Partner: Bob Eddinger
- Children: 3

Rodney Norman Powell (born 1935) is a former civil rights leader in the Nashville Student Movement and an activist for LGBTQ rights.

== Early life and education ==
Born to Raymond and Norma Powell in Philadelphia, Pennsylvania, Rodney spent his childhood in poverty. His father circled through chauffeuring, carpentry, and laboring jobs while his mother was prohibited from doing any domestic jobs. She took up seamstressing to help with the household income. Raymond was raised with three other siblings, but he held the responsibility to become the academic success in their family. He took odd jobs such as making deliveries for a Jewish delicatessen to save up money for college. Around 10 years old, Powell says he knew he was gay and struggled to understand it. He spent his youth committed to the Boy Scouts and playing the violin. Heading home from school with his violin one day, Powell recalled being confronted by a group of kids and was "not nonviolent", using his violin case in self defense to fight them off. He attended the Catholic school, Saint Joseph's University, for his undergraduate and graduated with honors. He then attended the all-black HBCU Meharry Medical College, seeking out a "more authentic black experience". It was, however, not what he had expected. He sought to join the Civil Rights Movement, but felt the school was not promoting the movement and the students were more interested in socialite activities.

== Civil Rights Movement ==
Powell's civil rights activism began after he moved to Nashville, Tennessee, in 1957. Alongside other civil rights leaders Diane Nash, James Bevel, and Bernard Lafayette, Powell began training in nonviolent resistance under the guidance of James Lawson and in accordance with Martin Luther King Jr.'s nonviolent teachings. This group became known as the Nashville Student Movement, which began the Nashville sit-ins. These sit-ins led to the desegregation of lunch counters in Nashville, making it one of the first major cities to do so. During these protests Powell found it increasingly difficult to maintain nonviolence as he got aggravated. When this occurred, Reverend C. T. Vivian requested he "[g]o back to church and renew yourself to nonviolence." He and his future wife, Gloria Johnson, even made a commitment to not work on the same protests together in fear of not being able to maintain their nonviolence if the other got assaulted. Powell continued to work closely with Diane Nash to provide much of the organization to the 1961 Freedom Rides, however, due to threats from his school he was not able to participate without risking his medical degree. Martin Luther King Jr. had once explained to their group the importance of them finishing their education, because there was a dire need for black doctors in their community.

After their involvement in the Civil Rights Movement, Johnson and Powell joined the Peace Corps to go to Africa.

== LGBTQ rights ==
Equality Ride Bus used in the Equality Rides organized by SoulForce

It was not until he received motivation from Susan Ford Wiltshire that Powell began to advocate for LGBTQ rights. He was soon introduced to Soulforce, an LGBTQ organization inspired by King's teachings. Renewed in his activism, Powell contacted his peers from the Civil Rights Movement for help. However, he was turned down by most. This caused turmoil for Powell, feeling ostracized by the African-American community for his sexuality leading him to leave the NAACP. In 2005 he helps Soulforce organize the Equality Ride which were modeled after the Freedom Rides. During these rides he traveled to various military and religious institutions that promoted anti-homosexual agendas. Powell was seen as a mentor among Soulforce members as Mel White, founder of Soulforce, recalled how Powell pushed them to see their actions to the end and would scold them if they took bail due to it decreasing the impact of their actions. Powell now serves on the board of directors for Faith in America, an LGBTQ organization that seeks to transform organizations that discriminate toward LGBTQ members on the basis of religion.

== Personal life ==
Powell met Gloria Johnson, whom he married, at Meharry. They had three children: April Powell-Willingham, Allison Powell, and Daniel Powell. Later in their marriage, Powell came out as gay which his children accepted, but Johnson expressed trouble adjusting to this information. They divorced five years later in 1975. Afterwards, Powell left for Hawaii, so he could live as an openly gay man and was able to meet his current partner Bob Eddinger, a zoologist. He worked at John A. Burns School of Medicine.

Powell continues to advocate for LGBTQ rights, but has taken a more relaxed role in his activism. Powell is now retired from medicine, living in Honolulu with Eddinger.
