= Electoral history of Dick Gephardt =

List of elections featuring Dick Gephardt as a candidate

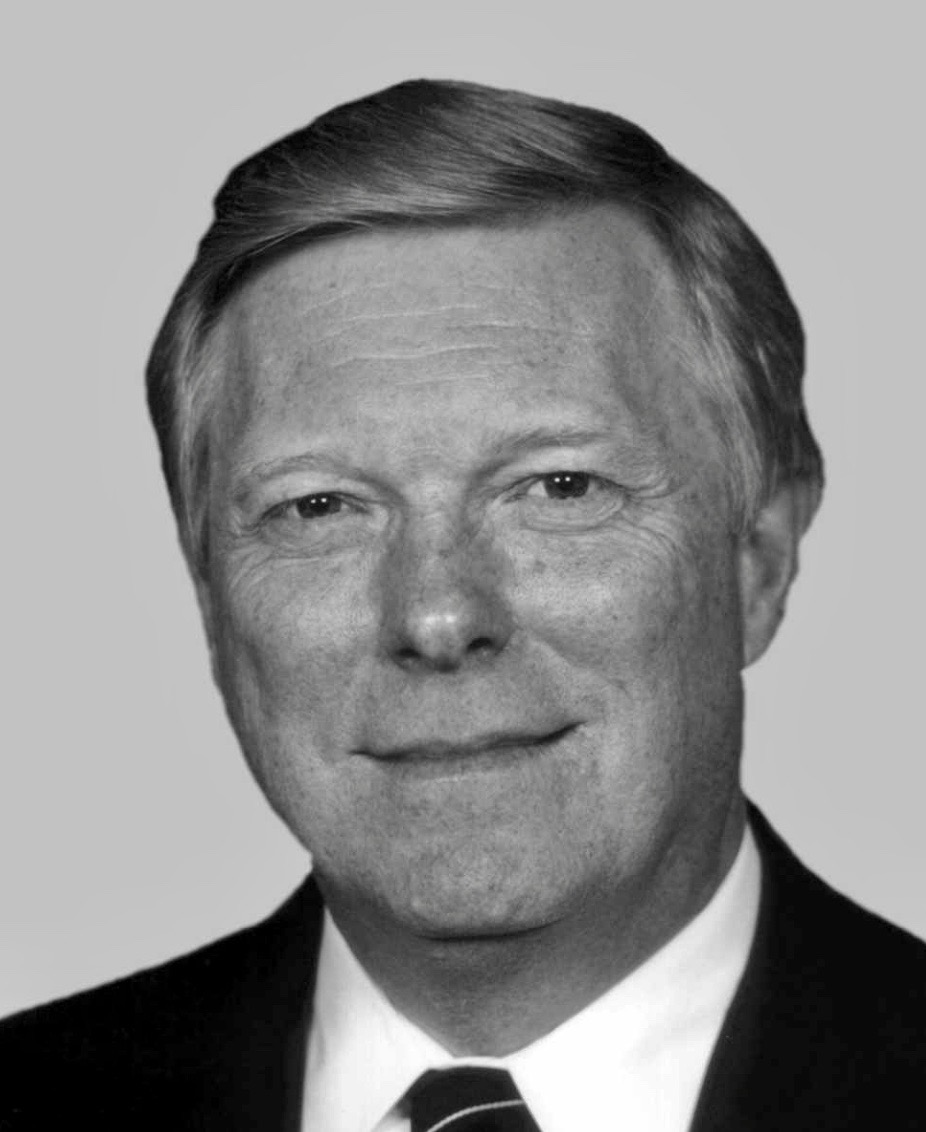
Rep. Dick Gephardt (D-MO)

Electoral history of Dick Gephardt, United States Representative from Missouri (1977-2005), Majority Leader of the United States House of Representatives (1989-1995), Minority Leader (1995-2003) and a candidate for 1988 and 2004 Democratic presidential nominations

== U.S. House of Representatives ==
=== Congressional elections ===
Missouri's 3rd congressional district, 1976 (Democratic primary):
■ Dick Gephardt – 48,874 (55.98%)
■ Donald J. Gralike – 32,791 (37.56%)
■ Victoria Schmidt – 2,960 (3.39%)
■ Marie S. Nowak – 2,680 (3.07%)

Missouri's 3rd congressional district, 1976:
■ Dick Gephardt (D) – 115,109 (63.69%)
■ Joseph L. Badaracco (R) – 65,623 (36.31%)

Missouri's 3rd congressional district, 1978:
■ Dick Gephardt * (D) – 121,565 (81.89%)
■ Lee Buchschacher (R) – 26,881 (18.11%)

Missouri's 3rd congressional district, 1980:
■ Dick Gephardt * (D) – 143,132 (77.62%)
■ Robert A. Cedarburg (R) – 41,277 (22.38%)

Missouri's 3rd congressional district, 1982:
■ Dick Gephardt * (D) – 131,566 (77.87%)
■ Richard Foristel (R) – 37,388 (22.13%)

Missouri's 3rd congressional district. 1984:
■ Dick Gephardt * (D) – 193,537 (100.00%)

Missouri's 3rd congressional district, 1986:
■ Dick Gephardt * (D) – 116,403 (68.97%)
■ Roy Amelung (R) – 52,382 (31.04%)

Missouri's 3rd congressional district, 1988:
■ Dick Gephardt * (D) – 150,205 (62.82%)
■ Mark Hearne (R) – 86,763 (36.29%)
■ Lloyd Sloan (L) – 2,128 (0.89%)

Missouri's 3rd congressional district, 1990:
■ Dick Gephardt * (D) – 88,950 (56.80%)
■ Mack Holekamp (R) – 67,659 (43.20%)

Missouri's 3rd congressional district, 1992:
■ Dick Gephardt * (D) – 174,000 (64.01%)
■ Mack Holekamp (R) – 90,006 (33.11%)
■ Robert Stockhausen (L) – 7,828 (2.88%)

Missouri's 3rd congressional district, 1994 (Democratic primary):
■ Dick Gephardt * – 54,582 (76.96%)
■ Leif O. Johnson – 11,619 (16.38%)
■ Lee Lehmuth – 4,718 (6.65%)

Missouri's 3rd congressional district, 1994:
■ Dick Gephardt * (D) – 117,601 (57.67%)
■ Gary Gill (R) – 80,977 (39.71%)
■ Bradley Ems (L) – 5,362 (2.63%)

Missouri's 3rd congressional district, 1996 (Democratic primary):
■ Dick Gephardt * – 45,619 (75.16%)
■ Joseph C. Keller – 12,390 (20.41%)
■ Leif O. Johnson – 2,690 (4.43%)

Missouri's 3rd congressional district, 1996:
■ Dick Gephardt * (D) – 137,300 (58.99%)
■ Debbie Wheelehan (R) – 90,202 (38.75%)
■ Michael H. Crist (L) – 3,966 (1.70%)
■ James E. Keersemaker (NL) – 1,287 (0.55%)

Missouri's 3rd congressional district, 1998 (Democratic primary):
■ Dick Gephardt * – 28,440 (73.85%)
■ Steven G. Bailey – 10,070 (26.15%)

Missouri's 3rd congressional district, 1998:
■ Dick Gephardt * (D) – 98,287 (55.81%)
■ Bill Federer (R) – 74,005 (42.03%)
■ Michael H. Crist (L) – 2,275 (1.29%)
■ Joseph C. Keller (TP) – 1,532 (0.87%)

Missouri's 3rd congressional district, 2000 (Democratic primary):
■ Dick Gephardt * – 40,111 (100.00%)

Missouri's 3rd congressional district, 2000:
■ Dick Gephardt * (D) – 147,222 (57.84%)
■ Bill Federer (R) - 100,967 (39.67%)
■ Mary Maroney (GP) – 3,266 (1.28%)
■ Michael H. Crist (L) – 2,245 (0.88%)
■ Anthony J. Windisch (RP) – 839 (0.33%)

Missouri's 3rd congressional district, 2002 (Democratic primary):
■ Dick Gephardt * – 44,535 (73.55%)
■ Michael Bram – 16,014 (26.45%)

Missouri's 3rd congressional district, 2002:
■ Dick Gephardt (D) (inc.) – 122,181 (59.06%)
■ Cathy S. Enz (R) – 80,551 (38.94%)
■ Daniel Byington (L) – 4,146 (2.00%)

=== Party leadership elections ===
Majority leader, 1989:
■ Dick Gephardt – 181 (70.16%)
■ Edgar Jenkins – 76 (29.46%)
■ Lee H. Hamilton – 1 (0.39%)

Majority leader, 1990:
■ Dick Gephardt * - Unanimous consent

Majority leader, 1992:
■ Dick Gephardt * – Unanimous consent

Minority leader, 1994:
■ Dick Gephardt – 150 (75.00%)
■ Charlie Rose – 50 (25.00%)

Minority leader, 1996:
■ Dick Gephardt * – Unanimous consent

Minority leader, 2000:
■ Dick Gephardt * – Unanimous consent

=== Speaker of the House elections ===
Election for Speaker, 1995:
■ Newt Gingrich (R) – 228 (52.54%)
■ Dick Gephardt (D) – 202 (46.54%)
■ present – 4 (0.92%)

Election for Speaker, 1997:
■ Newt Gingrich * (R) – 216 (50.83%)
■ Dick Gephardt (D) – 205 (48.24%)
■ Jim Leach (R) – 2 (0.47%)
■ Robert Michel (R) – 1 (0.23%)
■ Robert S. Walker (R) – 1 (0.23%)

Election for Speaker, 1999:
■ Dennis Hastert (R) – 220 (52.00%)
■ Dick Gephardt (D) – 205 (48.00%)

Election for Speaker, 2001:
■ Dennis Hastert * (R) – 222 (51.50%)
■ Dick Gephardt (D) – 206 (47.80%)
■ John Murtha (D) – 1 (0.23%)
■ present – 2 (0.47%)

== Presidential elections ==
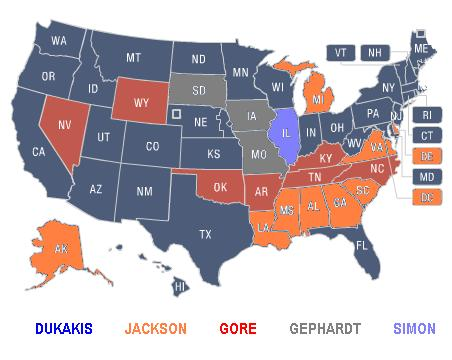
1988 Democratic presidential primaries by state results; Gephardt won in Iowa, Missouri and South Dakota

=== 1988 ===
1988 Democratic presidential primaries:
■ Michael Dukakis – 9,898,750 (42.46%)
■ Jesse Jackson – 6,788,991 (29.12%)
■ Al Gore – 3,185,806 (13.67%)
■ Dick Gephardt – 1,399,041 (6.00%)
■ Paul M. Simon – 1,082,960 (4.65%)
■ Gary Hart – 415,716 (1.78%)
■ Unpledged – 250,307 (1.07%)
■ Bruce Babbitt – 77,780 (0.33%)
■ Lyndon LaRouche – 70,938 (0.30%)
■ David Duke – 45,289 (0.19%)
■ Jim Traficant – 30,879 (0.13%)
■ Douglas Applegate – 25,068 (0.11%)

1988 Democratic National Convention presidential nomination vote tally:
■ Michael Dukakis – 2,877 (70.09%)
■ Jesse Jackson – 1,219 (29.70%)
■ Richard H. Stallings – 3 (0.07%)
■ Joe Biden – (0.05%)
■ Dick Gephardt – 2 (0.05%)
■ Lloyd Bentsen – 1 (0.02%)
■ Gary Hart – 1 (0.02%)

=== 2004 ===
2004 Democratic presidential primaries:
■ John Kerry – 9,930,497 (60.98%)
■ John Edwards – 3,162,337 (19.42%)
■ Howard Dean – 903,460 (5.55%)
■ Dennis Kucinich – 620,242 (3.81%)
■ Wesley Clark – 547,369 (3.36%)
■ Al Sharpton – 380,865 (2.34%)
■ Joe Lieberman – 280,940 (1.73%)
■ Uncommitted – 157,953 (0.97%)
■ Lyndon LaRouche – 103,731 (0.64%)
■ Carol Moseley Braun – 98,469 (0.61%)
■ Dick Gephardt – 63,902 (0.39%)
■ Scattering – 63,902 (0.39%)
