= Jacob Reitan =

American activist

Jacob "Jake" Reitan (born 1982) is an LGBT activist who founded the Soulforce Equality Ride.

== Early life and education ==
Reitan was born in 1982 in Mankato, Minnesota, into a Lutheran family and is one of four siblings. He has described being the target of anti-gay harassment as early as seventh grade, and first found his anxieties about his sexual orientation eased in the tenth grade when his English teacher Gwen Walz announced her classroom was "a safe space for gay and lesbian students@. He came out to his sister, then Gwen Walz, and then his parents while a junior at Mankato West High School. He came out to his classmates during the summer of 1999, as senior year approached. After experiencing harassment during his senior year, he told the school principal he planned to come out and found a gay-straight alliance before graduation. To serve as faculty advisor to that organization, the principal chose geography teacher and football coach Tim Walz, a future Minnesota governor and the Democratic Vice Presidential candidate Tim Walz He graduated magna cum laude from Northwestern University in Evanston, Illinois, majoring in Communication Studies and Political Science. He received his masters from Harvard Divinity School and his J.D. degree from the University of Minnesota Law School.

== Career ==
After some experimentation in 2005, he and Haven Herrin launched Soulforce's Equality Ride Project in 2006. He was arrested for trespassing at Liberty University in March where he said: "We want to come to the school today to say, 'learn from history.' We have a right to be here, because this school teaches that being gay is being sick and sinful. We have a right to question and to show how we are children of God." A few weeks later at West Point, just before being arrested, he said that "We're going to take this country by storm and in five years' time, it's going to be a different country because of us." When he, Herrin and a third friend attempted to enlist in the Minnesota National Guard to protest the military's "Don't ask, don't tell" policy, he was not immediately rejected, but told his arrest at West Point would need to be resolved first. Advocate Magazine named him as one of its People of the Year for 2006 and Out Magazine named him one of the Out 100 people of 2006.

Reitan is featured in the documentary film about the 2006 Equality Ride, Equality U.

He wrote a regular column called "Faith in Action" that appeared in Lavender, a Minnesota LGBTQ news magazine. He and his family appeared in the documentary For the Bible Tells Me So.

On December 22, 2010, at the invitation of the White House, Reitan joined other LGBTQ rights activists to witness the signing of the Don't Ask, Don't Tell Repeal Act of 2010.

When questioned in 2024 about his dealings with Tim Walz while in high school, Reitan praised him work both in supporting LGBTQ students and confronting bullies. In support of Walz, Reitan appeared briefly along with several other of Walz's students in a video shown at the 2024 Democratic National Convention.

Currently, Reitan works as an attorney at Reitan Law Office with offices in Mankato, Chaska and Minneapolis, Minnesota. He represents clients in the areas of a personal injury, Social Security disability and worker's compensation.
