= Mel White =

American clergyman and author (born 1940)

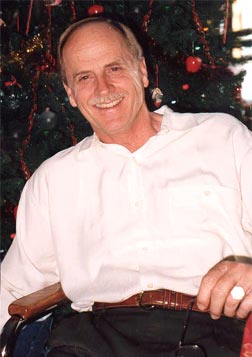
- White in 1995
- Born: James Melville White; June 26, 1940 (age 86); Santa Clara, California, U.S.
- Education: Warner Pacific College; University of Portland
- Occupations: Author; clergyman; activist
- Spouses: Lyla Lee Loehr (m. 1962; div. 1982) Gary Nixon (m. 2008; died 2024)
- Children: 2, including Mike White

James Melville White (born June 26, 1940) is an American clergyman and author. White was a behind-the-scenes member of the Evangelical Protestant movement through the 1960s, 1970s, and 1980s, writing film and television specials and ghostwriting autobiographies for televangelists such as Jerry Falwell, Pat Robertson, and Billy Graham. After years of writing for the Christian right, he came out as gay in 1994 and devoted himself full-time to minister to lesbians, gays, bisexuals, and transgender people, also writing extensively on the subject of gay Christians.

== Life and career ==
White was born in Santa Clara, California, the son of Faythe Alvera (Rear) and Olin "Carl" White. White graduated from Warner Pacific College and married Lyla Lee Loehr. They had two children, one of whom is the actor and filmmaker Mike White.

After receiving his BA from Warner Pacific College, then graduating with an MA in communications from the University of Portland, White followed with graduate work in communications and film at University of Southern California, UCLA, and Harvard. He received his Doctorate of Ministry from, and was a professor of communications and preaching for over a decade at Fuller Theological Seminary. During this time he also worked as an evangelical pastor.

After their marriage, White admitted to his wife that he had always been attracted to men. He embarked on a long process of attempted 'cures' for his homosexuality, including psychotherapy, prayer, electroconvulsive therapy, and exorcism. None of these techniques changed his attraction to men, and after he attempted suicide, he and his wife agreed to an amicable divorce. His son Mike is bisexual.

In 1984, White began dating Gary Nixon. In 1994, White wrote his autobiography, Stranger at the Gate: To Be Gay And Christian In America, which detailed his former career in the Religious Right and his struggle coming to terms with his sexuality. His ex-wife wrote the foreword to this book. His latest book, Holy Terror: Lies the Christian Right Tells To Deny Gay Equality was released in hardback as Religion Gone Bad: Hidden Dangers from the Christian Right.

After coming out, White transferred his clergy credentials to the gay-affirming Metropolitan Community Church.

In 1997, White was awarded the American Civil Liberties Union's National Civil Liberties Award for his efforts to apply the "soul force" principles of Mahatma Gandhi and Martin Luther King Jr. to the struggle for justice for sexual minorities. He founded Soulforce, a gay advocacy group, in 1998.

On June 18, 2008, White and Nixon were the first same-sex couple legally married at All Saints Episcopal Church (Pasadena, California) following the May 16, 2008 action of the Supreme Court of California overturning the state's ban on same-sex marriage. Nixon died on August 12, 2024.

== Writings and works ==
White ghostwrote several books for fellow evangelicals, including Billy Graham (Approaching Hoofbeats), Pat Robertson (America's Date with Destiny), and Jerry Falwell (Strength for the Journey and If I Should Die Before I Wake).

Since 1993, he has devoted himself full-time to minister to lesbians, gays, bisexuals, and transgender people, working on their behalf in the media, in the political process, and with fellow religious leaders.

White's autobiography, Stranger at the Gate: To be Gay and Christian in America (1994), is still being read widely, especially by LGBTQ people, their families and friends struggling to reconcile faith with sexual orientation. White's latest book, Religion Gone Bad: Hidden Dangers from the Christian Right (2007), is called "A consciousness-raising, must-read book" by Bishop John Shelby Spong. It was reissued later in revised form with the title Holy Terror: Lies the Christian Right Tells Us to Deny Gay Equality.

He has produced, written, and directed 53 documentary films and television specials on spirituality.

He is also an author; among his 16 books (nine bestsellers), he wrote Aquino, a book about the Philippines' Ninoy and Corazon Aquino, Deceived about the Jonestown tragedy, David about David Rothenberg (a child burned by his father, later depicted in the film David), and Lust: The Other Side of Love.

He was talk-show host/producer in When the Going Gets Tough.

== In popular culture ==
In 2009, White appeared on the fourteenth season of The Amazing Race along with his son Mike. The two completed seven legs of the race before being eliminated in sixth place in Phuket, Thailand. The team subsequently participated in The Amazing Race: Unfinished Business, an edition featuring eleven returning teams. They were the second team eliminated and finished in 10th place in Yokosuka, Japan at the end of the third leg. Mel and Mike were eliminated after being hospitalized with hypothermia.

White is also a contributor to the DVD program Living the Questions, an introduction to Progressive Christianity. Dr. White is also featured in the documentary For the Bible Tells Me So. Dr. White is also prominently featured in the documentary True Believer (2024) by Kristen Irving.

The Cambodian NGO New Future for Children is supported by White.

== Books and stories under his own name ==
- White, Mel (1978). Lust: The Other Side of Love. Fleming H. Revell. p. 191. ISBN 0-8007-0932-2.
- White, Mel (1979). Deceived. Spire Books. ISBN 978-0-8007-8367-9.
- Sam Clemens and the Notable Mare (1993) (collected in Mike Resnick's alternate history anthology Alternate Warriors)
- White, Mel (April 1995). Stranger at the Gate: To Be Gay and Christian in America. Penguin Group (USA). p. 325. ISBN 0-452-27381-1.
- White, Mel (September 2006). Religion Gone Bad: Hidden Dangers from the Christian Right. Penguin Group (USA). p. 384. ISBN 1-58542-531-1.
