= Equality Ride =

LGBTQ rights bus tour by Soulforce

The first Equality Ride bus showing part of its slogan, "Learn from History: End Religion-Based Oppression."

The Equality Ride is a periodic LGBT rights bus tour made for young adults and sponsored by Soulforce, a national LGBT nonprofit organization. They seek to debate LGBT issues with students at conservative Christian colleges and military academies and secular universities.

== Early Rides ==
Jacob Reitan, a 23-year-old Christian activist from Minnesota and director of youth programs for Soulforce, initiated the rides. In 2005, he conducted trial runs at Liberty University in the spring and at the U.S. Naval Academy in the fall. At Liberty University he spoke informally to students. According to organizers, they tried without success to donate books about homosexuality to the library. Reitan said they asked the University to designate some place on campus where students could talk about being gay without fear of being expelled or having their parents informed. They were also unable to turn over to Jerry Falwell, the university's founder and chancellor, anonymous letters written, they said, by gay Liberty students. When asked about the school's policies toward gay students, a spokesman said, "We follow Scripture."

== 2006 Ride ==
From March 10 to and April 26, 2006, a group of about 35 people all under the age of 26, half of whom were Christian, went on the first Equality Ride bus tour. Inspired by the Freedom Rides of the 1960s, the Riders traveled to 19 colleges and universities, including sixteen faith-based institutions in the Christian tradition, two military academies, and one secular university with an ROTC program. Equality Ride contacted the schools in advance and, if they were unable to agree on a format for dialogue, planned to hold a demonstration. Before leaving, they met with Congressman John Lewis, a participant in the original 1961 Freedom Rides and a leader of the Student Nonviolent Coordinating Committee (SNCC). He told them: "My mother told me growing up, 'Don't get in the way; don't get in trouble.' I'm so glad I got in the way and got in trouble." He urged the Equality Riders to "make good trouble." Some 35 Riders also met with officials of the Council for Christian Colleges and Universities in Washington, D.C., who said they took the arrival of the Riders as a chance, according to one report, "to replace the stereotype of the intolerant conservative Christian with a more compassionate 'Christ-centered' response–albeit a response that still views homosexuality as a sin."

Azusa Pacific University organized a program for the Riders that included a breakfast, a chapel service, and a panel discussion. In advance of their arrival, the dean of students said: "The conversation is coming into the open. We don't need to go into a holy huddle." An official said: "We believe it is our responsibility as Christ-followers to demonstrate loving, scriptural treatment of our guests while maintaining an unwavering commitment to our policy statement, which prohibits homosexual activity at the university." At Liberty University, Riders attempted to cross into campus property after being warned not to. Some 24 were arrested for trespass. Its president Falwell said that following the group's visit in 2005 "Several of the Soulforce delegation later professed faith in Christ and abandoned the homosexual lifestyle. However, it is now our firm belief that Soulforce is ... simply trying to use such encounters on Christian college campuses as a media attraction and for their ultimate purpose of fundraising."

The Equality Riders also rallied outside a conference of the Council for Christian Colleges and Universities in Dallas on March 31. The ex-gay ministry Exodus International sent teams to some of the colleges in anticipation of the Equality Riders' visit. Its president, Alan Chambers, said Christians needed to prepare for greater activism on the part of homosexual activists, educate themselves, and then "go out in the public square and begin countering the lies ... with the truth." At California Baptist University in early April, Riders and students challenged each other with Bible verses and their personal histories,

On April 10, Brigham Young University allowed the Equality Riders to come onto campus property and speak to students individually, but prohibited public forums or displays on campus property. The University stated that this was general procedure for any group visiting the campus. At one point the Riders were asked to leave campus for holding what was deemed a public forum and several were later arrested for holding a protest on campus property and refusing to leave.

On April 14, Riders were admitted to the grounds of the United States Air Force Academy as members of the general public, allowed to access public areas, but not private housing or secured cadet areas. Lawful demonstrators were allowed to protest, while 10 who violated the rules by handing out literature or speaking with a portable sound system were arrested for disorderly conduct. On April 26, 21 were arrested in similar circumstances at the U.S. Military Academy.

Reitan said he had bigger plans for the next year's Ride: "We're going to bring it to rural Alabama and Gary, Indiana, and Mankato, Minnesota, to Small Town, USA. And we're going to humanize and localize this issue for the American people."

=== Documentary ===
A film crew documented the 2006 Equality Ride. Their feature-length film, Equality U, follows 34 Soulforce members and their meetings with and presentations to college groups. One review described the participants as "like a gaggle of Real World stars," said the film "focuses on a handful of the riders, showing their ups and downs on the road," and found it "hard to imagine being ... on a bus for two months" with Reitan "bringing a little too much enthusiasm to the plan". Another noted its focus on how "disagreements about strategy cleave the Riders almost from the start" and added: "Yet train a camera on humans long enough — especially in such hothouse conditions — and they will surprise even a viewer who has seen scores of documentaries about gay culture."

== 2007 Ride ==
The 2007 Equality Ride lasted from March 1 to April 30. Two buses visited 33 schools. One toured the eastern United States, visiting 18 schools, and the other toured the western, visiting 15 schools.

Dordt College in Sioux Center, Iowa, invited Equality Riders on campus for two days of classroom presentations, dialogue, meals with students, Bible study, and community meetings. Equality Riders gave a presentation on "Loving Like Jesus" and passed out informational pamphlets titled "What the Bible Says and Doesn't Say About Homosexuality." The Equality Riders' bus was vandalized with graffiti and the school denounced the activity and washed the graffiti off of the bus.

Later in March 2007, a Baylor University official e-mailed faculty and students the day before the Riders' arrival, stating that the university would not allow a dialogue to take place on campus. Six Equality Riders were arrested by university police on charges of criminal trespass when they refused to stop chalking sidewalks with what they called "messages of love and hope". Baylor administrators said they were in violation of university policy that allows only school-affiliated organizations to write messages on sidewalks after completing an online application.

In early April 2007, Bruce Voyles, dean of students at Covenant College, expressed disappointment that the Riders did not accept his college's guidelines for a visit. He told newspaper reporters: "You have to wonder if they were really interested in dialogue or were just making some sort of statement." Twenty-six Riders arrived at the campus entrance and were warned by college administrators that they would be arrested if they set foot on school property. For nearly three hours, dozens of Covenant students prayed and read the Bible with the Riders and gave them boxed lunches and water. Four Equality Riders entered school property and read a statement to "encourage Covenant College to become an environment that reflects the wideness of God's grace and diversity of the body of Christ." Dade County police arrested them on charges of criminal trespass.

On April 16, 2007, the Equality Riders visited Brigham Young University-Idaho. They had been told not trespass on the school's property. Marc Stevens, a spokesman for BYU-Idaho, explained that "BYU-Idaho is a private university that can't be used by any outside group to advocate its position." Eight Riders were peacefully arrested after attempting to enter university grounds. At an earlier visit to BYU, Riders had made an issue of the school's honor code, which condemned homosexuality in general terms, including advocacy and "any behaviors that indicate homosexual conduct, including those not sexual in nature". Following the Riders' 2007 visit, the school amended the code to more clearly ban those who engaged in homosexual acts rather than those with an LGBT sexual orientation. Officials said the change was under consideration before the Riders' 2007 visit.

At Calvin College, administrators cited Christian Reformed Church instructions to create a better understanding of homosexuality. Vice President for student life Shirley Hoogstra said: "We have conversations about human sexuality on campus and the Equality Ride would fit into that series of conversations. Also a hallmark of a Calvin education is that we are willing to listen to other points of view, even those with which we are in disagreement, and we also appreciate opportunities to share our points of view." The school held several events in advance of the Riders' April 24 visit. Her assessment afterwards was: "Equality Ride reminded us that silence on issues of injustice cannot be tolerated. We stand with them on that issue. But there were also significant places where we had vigorous debate."

At Oklahoma Baptist University, five riders were arrested after attempting to enter chapel services that day to engage in dialogue with students about LGBTQ issues within their school and within the Christian religion. Additionally, the group tries to affect change on campus through the establishment of advocacy groups and safe places for students and non-discrimination and anti-bullying policies through the schools’ administrations. The Green Book, OBU's student handbook which includes its code of student conduct, explicitly condemns homosexual relations (along with all forms of non-marital sex). While there are no possible recriminations concerning celibate homosexuals, self-avowed practicing homosexuals could undergo counseling or face probation or expulsion. During the 2006 visit, the riders promised a return visit the next year and asked OBU officials for permission to begin a forum on campus and for the ability to hand out flyers and literature. However, OBU administrators turned down all proposals and the Riders were asked not to enter campus grounds in any fashion. The Riders would be permitted to stand on the public right-of-way on MacArthur Street, which cuts through OBU's campus. According to the group's press release, "In addition to the harsher policy since our last visit to the OBU campus in 2006, a student’s request to include LGBT students in the university’s anti-discrimination policy was rejected this past year. The rejection came in spite of the university’s previous promise to add sexual orientation and gender identity to the list of protected groups," said Co-Director of Soulforce, Jarrett Lucas. When the five attempted to enter Raley Chapel, they were promptly detained by OBU security and later arrested by Shawnee police. Their fines were $109 each, which were paid by donations to their cause.

The Riders also visited and were denied access to Central Bible College and Colorado Christian University.

== Later Rides ==
The 2008 Ride included stops at Southwestern Baptist Theological Seminary in Fort Worth, Dallas Baptist University, where a lunch and discussion were scheduled, and a dozen more.

Baylor was anticipating the arrival of another Equality Ride in April 2010. The university granted the Riders access to the student union and campus food court, and the Riders planned not to chalk as they had on a previous visit. Vice president of student life Kevin Jackson: "Our desire is that our campus will show the care and compassion of our Christian faith. And in doing so, what we would hope is that individuals on campus would not feel compelled to protest." The stop was part of a 16-college tour that included Hardin–Simmons University and Abilene Christian University.

The 2012 Ride was scheduled to leave from Philadelphia on March 3 and visit 12 cities.

== See also ==
- LGBT-welcoming church programs
- Right to Serve Campaign, a Soulforce campaign that grew out of the Equality Ride
- Rodney N. Powell
