= Chrissy Gephardt =

American activist

Christine Gephardt
- Education: Northwestern University; Washington University in St. Louis
- Occupations: LGBT rights activist, social worker
- Spouse: Christina
- Father: Dick Gephardt

Christine Leigh Gephardt is an American LGBT rights activist and former social worker who campaigned for her father Dick Gephardt during the 2004 U.S. presidential election.

== Biography ==
Gephardt worked on her father's political campaigns as a child in St. Louis, Missouri. She later became a social worker after graduating from Northwestern University. In her practice as a social worker, she helped abused and mentally ill women in Washington, D.C. She married Marc Alan Leibole in 1997, a man she later called "my best friend", according to the Los Angeles Times. In the early 2000s, she attended Washington University, where she met Amy Loder.

Gephardt came out to her family as a lesbian in April 2001. She had fallen in love with another woman, Loder, while in graduate school at the George Warren Brown School of Social Work. She first came to public attention when NBC announced that she was gay. She had been married to Marc Alan Leibole for three years before she fell in love with a woman, and came out to her husband and to her father. She was subsequently featured on the cover of The Advocate.

In 2003, Gephardt quit her job as a social worker to campaign for her father full-time. According to the Knight Ridder Tribune, Gephardt is the first prominent LGBT relative to promote a major political campaign in the United States. Out magazine called her inclusion "a sea change in presidential campaigns: Not only are gay family members no longer considered a potential liability (see Mary Cheney), we are in fact a coveted constituency worth fighting for." In 2004, she helped start up chapters of the Stonewall Democrats in Washington, D.C. She is an activist.

Gephardt was raised in a Catholic household. She identifies as a Christian.

== Appearances ==
She appeared on the Showtime reality show American Candidate in 2004. Gephardt said that the "show is giving me opportunities to express myself. I wanted to inspire gays and lesbians, women and other minority groups, and basically everybody who gets left out of the process." She also appeared on the February 1, 2007 (episode #1030), episode of The Daily Show. She is interviewed in the 2007 documentary For the Bible Tells Me So, along with her parents, where she describes her life and the encouragement she received from her parents after coming out. The film's director, Daniel Karslake, wanted to feature the Gephardts because her "family really espouses the values of loving your children no matter what," according to Curve. Gephardt was also featured on a cover of Curve in 2007.
