= Donald J. Gralike =

American politician (1929–2015)

Member of the Missouri Senate from the 1st district
- In office 1972–1976

Personal details
- Born: October 22, 1929 St. Louis County, Missouri
- Died: December 6, 2015 (aged 86) Missouri, United States
- Party: Democratic
- Spouse: Rita J. Simeone
- Children: 4
- Education: Washington University
- Occupation: politician, teacher, soldier, union president

Donald J. Gralike (October 22, 1929 – December 6, 2015) was an American politician who served in the Missouri Senate and the Missouri House of Representatives. He served in the U.S. Army with the 185th Engineer Combat Battery during the Korean War from January 1952 until January 1954. Gralike was previously elected to the Missouri House of Representatives in 1962, serving until 1972 and previously as House majority whip. He also served as a local president for the International Brotherhood of Electrical Workers. In 1976, Gralike ran against future U.S. House Minority Leader Dick Gephardt to represent the Missouri's 3rd congressional district, losing 56% to 38%. He later served as vice chairman of the Missouri Veterans Commission until November 2, 2003. He died after a short illness in 2015.
