= Tonia Poteat =

- Born: North Carolina, USA

Academic background
- Education: BA, Biology, 1991, Yale University MMSc., 1995, Emory School of Medicine Physician Assistant Program MPH, Behavioral Science, 2007, Rollins School of Public Health; PhD, Johns Hopkins Bloomberg School of Public Health
- Thesis: The role of stigma and discrimination in health care utilization and HIV risk among transgender adults (2012)

Academic work
- Institutions: University of North Carolina; Johns Hopkins Bloomberg School of Public Health

Tonia C. Poteat is an American epidemiologist. She is an associate professor of Social Medicine at the University of North Carolina where she focuses on HIV, having previously worked at the Johns Hopkins Bloomberg School of Public Health.

== Early life and education ==
Poteat was born in North Carolina to ministers Brenda and David Poteat and raised devoutly Christian. She earned her Bachelor of Science degree from Yale University, subsequently becoming the first person in her family to finish college. From there, she enrolled at the Emory School of Medicine Physician Assistant Program and subsequently enrolled in the Rollins School of Public Health for her Master of Public Health and completed her PhD in International Health from Johns Hopkins Bloomberg School of Public Health. She chose to return to school for her PhD after her mother returned to school to finish her bachelor's degree in her late 50's. When Poteat came out to her parents as a lesbian, they supported her in spite of their religious beliefs. Their story is shared in the 2007 film For the Bible Tells Me So, directed by Daniel G. Karslake.

During her time in Emory University's Physician Assistant Program, she served as a National Health Service Corps Scholar and provided care at a methadone clinic and community health center in New York and a family practice in Kansas City following graduation. In 2003, she travelled to South Africa and became involved in the international AIDS movement. Upon returning to North America, she accepted a position with the Global AIDS Program at the Centers for Disease Control and Prevention.

== Career ==
Upon graduating with her PhD in 2012, Poteat served as the Senior Technical Advisor for Key Populations in the Office of the U.S. Global AIDS Coordinator for two years. After leaving office, she returned to her alma mater and accepted an assistant professor position at Johns Hopkins Bloomberg School of Public Health (JHU). In her first year at JHU, she received one of their 2014 Individual Diversity Awards from the Bloomberg School of Public Health.

In 2018, Poteat joined the University of North Carolina's Department of Social Medicine as an assistant professor and as a core faculty member in the UNC Center for Health Equity Research. In this role, she continued to study HIV and LGBT health disparities and health and well-being of transgender communities. One of the ways she conducted research into biological and psychosocial stress of transgender communities was through a study involving 200 participants. Over 24 months, the participants answered survey questions and provided saliva and blood samples as a way for Poteat to study their biomarkers of stress, which could then be linked to mental illness and cardiovascular disease risks. As a result of her research, she was appointed to the National Academies of Science Consensus Panel on the Well-Being of Sexual and Gender Minorities.

== Selected publications ==
- Burden of HIV among female sex workers in low-income and middle-income countries: a systematic review and meta-analysis (2012)
- Worldwide burden of HIV in transgender women: a systematic review and meta-analysis (2013)
