= Soulforce =

American social justice group

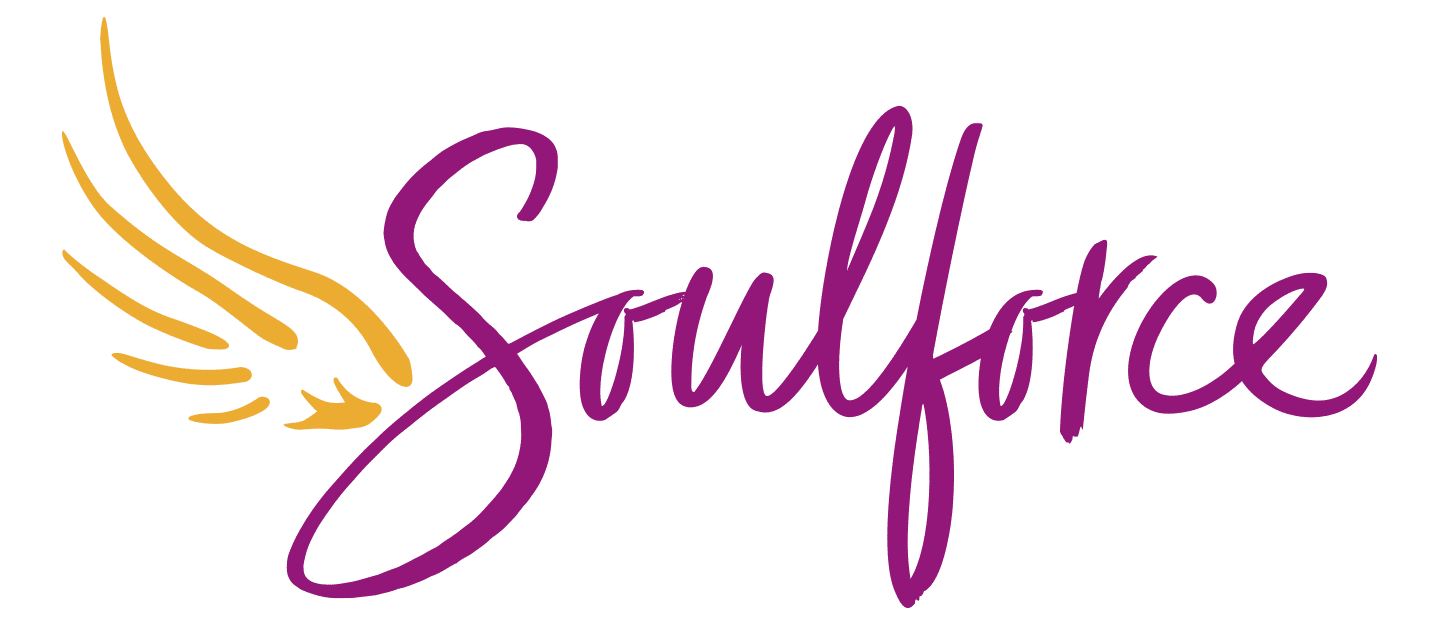
- Formation: November 1997
- Founder: Rev. Mel White; Gary Nixon
- Type: Nonprofit (501(c)(3))
- Legal status: 501(c)(3) organization
- Purpose: Ending religious and political oppression of LGBT people through Nonviolent resistance
- Headquarters: Abilene, Texas
- Region served: Worldwide
- Methods: Nonviolent resistance Direct action Advocacy; Education
- Executive Director: Rev Alba Onofrio
- Website: soulforce.org

Soulforce is a US-based 501(c)(3) nonprofit social justice organization that is working to end the religious and political oppression against LGBTQIA+ people through nonviolent resistance. It is led by Reverend Alba Onofrio.

Soulforce operates transnationally to create cultural shifts that reduce spiritual violence, including religious abuse and spiritual terrorism related to the misuse of religious teachings. It also challenges ideologies associated with white Christian supremacy and advocates reclaiming faith as a positive resource for healing and justice.

== History ==
Soulforce was founded in November 1997 by married life partners Rev. Mel White and Gary Nixon, based on principles of nonviolent resistance. Prior to co-founding the organization, Mel White worked for evangelical Christians as a pastor, seminary professor, filmmaker, and communications consultant, including work as a ghostwriter for several leaders of the Religious Right. After publicly identifying as a gay man in 1994, he published an autobiography titled Stranger at the Gate: To Be Gay and Christian in America. He subsequently began organizing protests aimed at challenging the positions and practices of Religious Right leaders regarding their treatment of LGBTQ+ people.

In October 1999, Soulforce gained national attention by organizing a historic meeting in Lynchburg, Virginia, between 200 LGBTQ Christian volunteers led by White and 200 members of Rev. Jerry Falwell’s Baptist church.

Following Lynchburg, Soulforce pursued a strategy of nonviolent direct action at sites of religious or political conflict over LGBTQ rights. In May 2000, Soulforce coordinated a large protest at the United Methodist Church General Conference in Cleveland, where the denomination was debating LGBTQ inclusion. The protest culminated in 191 people (including one bishop) being peacefully arrested after blocking exits to urge the church to stop treating “God’s lesbian, gay, bisexual and transgendered children” as second-class. White and Soulforce activists similarly demonstrated at other church conventions, such as Presbyterian and Southern Baptist meetings, whenever policies against LGBTQ clergy or unions were on the agenda. This wave of civil disobedience was dubbed as the “Stop Spiritual Violence” campaign.

In January 2001, a Soulforce/DignityUSA delegation even traveled to the Vatican to protest Catholic teachings on homosexuality; although barred from demonstrating inside Vatican City, they staged prayerful actions just outside St. Peter's Square wearing shirts reading “God’s Gay Children Bring Gifts – Bless Them”.

By the mid-2000s, Soulforce had broadened its activism beyond church assemblies to target influential organizations perpetuating anti-LGBTQ ideologies. In May 2005, Soulforce organized a high-profile protest at Focus on the Family’s headquarters in Colorado Springs, drawing hundreds of LGBTQ people and allies.

== Programming ==
=== Culto Cuir ===
Soulforce's Culto Cuir (Church of the Queerly Beloved) is a community-centered collaborative ritual space that focuses on spiritual healing and reclamation within Queer and Trans communities. It has been hosted in Bogotá, Colombia (July 2023), Quito, Ecuador (September 2023), Durham, North Carolina (June 2024), and Mexico City, Mexico (October 2024). Each experimental performing-arts gathering is organized with local community activist groups, LGBTQ performers, and affirming religious leaders, using a theological framework developed by Soulforce and co-adapted for each local context. Services typically include the traditional elements of prayer and music, but center drag performances, spoken-word poetry, and other LGBTQIA+ artists. The gatherings also feature specific re-imagined Christian rituals led by LGBTQIA+ clergy, such as the Trans Baptism and Name-Change Ceremony, a Communion of milk and honey, and a reverse Altar Call that responds to LGBTQIA+ experiences of spiritual violence at the hands of faith leaders, therapists and the mental-health and religious institutions they represent.

=== Somos Muchxs! Summit on Queer and Trans Theology ===
In late 2024, Soulforce and the Teología Sin Vergüenza community organized a transnational summit for Queer/Trans and feminist theologians, faith leaders, and religious activists in Mexico City. Somos Muchxs! (“We Are Many!”) was a three-day event that brought together participants from 13 countries to exchange ideas, build solidarity, and coordinate collective action in support of human rights and social justice.

=== The Institute on Spiritual Violence, Healing, and Social Change ===
The Institute on Spiritual Violence, Healing, and Social Change is a bilingual, transnational, and interdisciplinary initiative that researches and organizes against institutionalized violence rooted in religion and spirituality. It brings together social scientists, activists, survivors, theologians, and other civil-society members across the Americas. The institute aims to support communities free from spiritual and physical violence and to foster power relations founded on equality and respect for human dignity.

=== Teología Sin Vergüenza ===
Teología Sin Vergüenza (loosely translated as Shameless Theology) is a transnational, interdisciplinary media platform founded by Queer Latinx feminist theologians. It was developed in response to the dominance of Christian fundamentalist perspectives in Spanish-language religious media in Latin America and the United States. The platform brings together Queer and Trans Latinx scholars, faith leaders, and activists who explore the intersections of Gender, sexuality, and religion within academic, ecclesial, and activist movements.

=== Spirit Resource Library ===
Soulforce's Spirit Resource Library provides free online booklets in seven languages. These political and theological resources examine and critique fundamentalist ideologies while offering alternative perspectives on the Bible and Christian theology.

== Past programming ==
=== Equality Ride ===
The Soulforce Equality Ride was a social-justice program led by young adults who visited colleges and universities across the United States that discriminated against lesbian, gay, bisexual, transgender, and queer (LGBTQ) people through policy or culture. The program ran from 2006 to 2012 and involved over 100 participants visiting 101 Christian colleges and universities, aiming to facilitate dialogue about LGBTQIA+ issues and support affected students. During these visits, Equality Ride participants often represented the first openly affirming LGBTQIA+ perspectives invited onto these campuses to discuss issues at the intersection of faith and sexuality. The initiative provided both an educational and spiritual experience for participants and campus communities. Despite differing theological views, many institutions acknowledged the program's role in fostering constructive dialogue and greater understanding.

The Equality Ride was the subject of an award-winning 2008 documentary, Equality U, directed by Dave O’Brien. The film, which chronicled the experiences of the young riders on the inaugural 2006 bus tour, won the Emerging Talent Award for its director at Outfest (the Los Angeles Gay and Lesbian Film Festival) and a Special Programming Award for Freedom at NewFest in New York.

=== Give Back IX ===
The Soulforce Give Back IX was a campaign focused on promoting fairness, inclusion, and solidarity in the context of gender justice and sports. The campaign originated from concerns expressed by LGBTQIA+ staff and students at conservative Christian institutions, who believed that addressing high-profile areas like athletics and related financial investments was essential to achieve meaningful change. The campaign's title references Title IX, a U.S. federal law enacted to protect women and LGBTQIA+ individuals from discrimination in educational institutions. Title IX has historically faced controversy, particularly from conservative Christian colleges and universities, some of which have used religious exemptions to avoid compliance. While Title IX addresses a wide range of issues, it is most commonly associated with sports, particularly due to the public debates surrounding gender equality in funding for men's and women's athletics.

=== Right to Serve ===
In 2006. Soulforce organized the Right to Serve Campaign, the first nationally organized youth effort to bring attention to the "don't ask, don't tell" policy of the United States Armed Forces. Youth in 30 cities across the country were recruited to organize events in which openly lesbian, gay and bisexual youth attempted to enlist in the United States Armed Forces while stating their sexual orientation. Headed by Jacob Reitan and Haven Herrin, it took place in 30 cities from late summer and fall of 2006.

In May, in Roseville, a suburb of Minneapolis, two men and a woman tried to enlist in the Minnesota National Guard. One application was rejected immediately and the others put on hold. On August 30, in Madison, Wisconsin, an Army recruiter turned away three men, one a college graduate and the others college students. One of them said: "We're not here as a publicity stunt. I want to serve alongside my fellow Americans. That's why we're here." Two men turned away by recruiters in Chicago on September 12, 2006, returned the next day and staged a sit-in. A University of Maryland sophomore was turned away when she tried to enlist on September 26. Other events, some including arrests, occurred in New York; Austin, Texas; and Greensboro, North Carolina. In New York City, the recruitment center was closed, but the Right to Serve protesters staged a seven-hour sit-in.

== See also ==
- LGBT-welcoming church programs
