= Dick Gephardt =

American attorney, lobbyist and politician (born 1941)

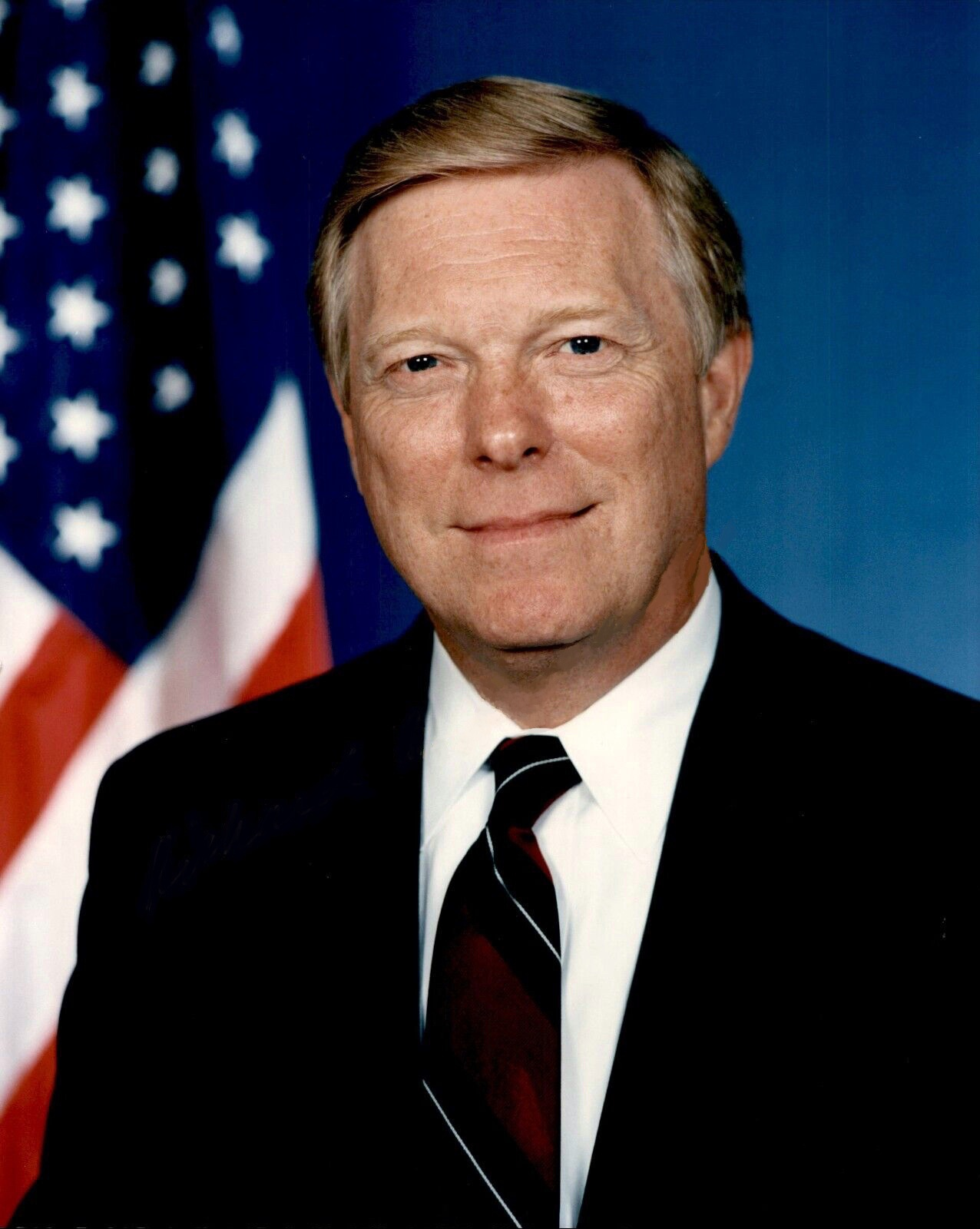
- Official portrait, 1997

House Minority Leader
- In office January 3, 1995 – January 3, 2003
- Whip: David Bonior; Nancy Pelosi
- Preceded by: Robert H. Michel
- Succeeded by: Nancy Pelosi

Leader of the House Democratic Caucus
- In office January 3, 1995 – January 3, 2003
- Preceded by: Tom Foley
- Succeeded by: Nancy Pelosi

House Majority Leader
- In office June 6, 1989 – January 3, 1995
- Speaker: Tom Foley
- Whip: William H. Gray; David Bonior
- Preceded by: Tom Foley
- Succeeded by: Dick Armey

Chair of the House Democratic Caucus
- In office January 3, 1985 – January 3, 1989
- Leader: Tip O'Neill; Jim Wright
- Preceded by: Gillis William Long
- Succeeded by: William H. Gray

Member of the U.S. House of Representatives from Missouri's 3rd district
- In office January 3, 1977 – January 3, 2005
- Preceded by: Leonor Sullivan
- Succeeded by: Russ Carnahan

Personal details
- Born: Richard Andrew Gephardt; January 31, 1941 (age 85) St. Louis, Missouri, U.S.
- Party: Democratic
- Spouse: Jane Gephardt (m. 1966; died 2024)
- Children: 3, including Chrissy
- Education: Northwestern University (BS); University of Michigan (JD)

Military service
- Allegiance: United States
- Branch/service: United States Air Force
- Years of service: 1965–1971
- Unit: Missouri Air National Guard
- Dick Gephardt's voice Dick Gephardt on legislation sanctioning Russia for missile exports to Iran. Recorded June 9, 1998

Richard Andrew Gephardt (/ˈɡɛphɑːrd/; born January 31, 1941) is an American attorney, lobbyist, and politician who represented Missouri's 3rd congressional district in the United States House of Representatives from 1977 to 2005. A member of the Democratic Party, he was House majority leader from 1989 to 1995 and minority leader from 1995 to 2003. He ran unsuccessfully for the Democratic nomination for President of the United States in 1988 and 2004. Gephardt was mentioned as a possible vice presidential nominee in 1988, 1992, 2000, 2004, and 2008.

Since his retirement from politics, Gephardt has become a lobbyist. He founded a Washington-based public affairs firm, Gephardt Government Affairs; an Atlanta-based labor consultancy, the Gephardt Group; and a direct primary care group, SolidaritUS Health. He also consults for DLA Piper, FTI Consulting and Goldman Sachs, and is a member of the ReFormers Caucus of Issue One and co-chair of Issue One's Council for Responsible Social Media with former Massachusetts lieutenant governor Kerry Healey.

== Early life ==
Gephardt was born in St. Louis, Missouri, on January 31, 1941, the son of Loreen Estelle (née Cassell) and Louis Andrew Gephardt, a Teamster milkman; part of his ancestry is German. He graduated from the former Southwest High School in 1958. Gephardt is an Eagle Scout and recipient of the Distinguished Eagle Scout Award from the Boy Scouts of America. He earned his B.S. at Northwestern University in 1962 where he was president of Beta Theta Pi, the student senate, and his freshman class. He earned his J.D. at the University of Michigan Law School in 1965.

In 1965, Gephardt was admitted to the Missouri Bar. He then entered the Missouri Air National Guard, where he served until 1971. He and his wife Jane have three grown children, Matt, Katie, and Chrissy. His brother, Donald L. Gephardt, was the Dean of The College of Fine and Performing Arts at Rowan University in Glassboro, New Jersey. Gephardt was a Democratic committeeman (precinct captain) for the 14th ward in St. Louis from 1968 through 1971.

== St. Louis Board of Aldermen (1971–1976) ==
Gephardt was the 14th ward alderman (city councilor) on the St. Louis Board of Aldermen from 1971 to 1976. On the council, he was part of a group of young aldermen known informally as "The Young Turks."

== U.S. House of Representatives (1977–2003) ==
=== Early tenure ===
In 1976, Gephardt was elected to Congress from the St. Louis–based 3rd district, succeeding 24-year incumbent Leonor Sullivan. He was elected 13 more times, opting not to run for reelection in 2004. For most of his Congressional career, Gephardt's National Political Director was St. Louis–based political consultant Joyce Aboussie. Gephardt voted in favor of the bill establishing Martin Luther King Jr. Day as a federal holiday in August 1983 but did not vote on the Civil Rights Restoration Act of 1987 (or the vote to override President Reagan's veto in March 1988).

=== 1988 presidential campaign ===
campaign logo

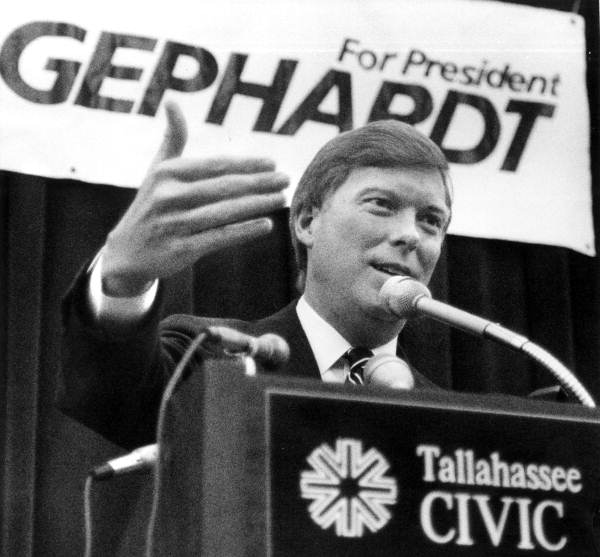
Gephardt campaigning for president in Tallahassee, Florida, 1987

Gephardt was an unsuccessful candidate for the Democratic nomination in the 1988 presidential election. He was one of the first to announce his candidacy that cycle in February 1987, over 100 days in Iowa. He was stuck in low double digits in polls, but began moving ahead in Iowa in late December 1987 after running an ad that criticized trade barriers by Korea and Japan as unfair. He won the Iowa caucuses and South Dakota primary in February while finishing a strong second in New Hampshire, making him a serious contender for the nomination.

Gephardt's early victories did not translate into support in other states, though, and he was not able to raise adequate funds to compete in the Southern primaries. His campaign ran out of money after losing badly in the March "Super Tuesday" primaries, when he won only the Missouri primary. An ad aired by Governor Michael Dukakis's campaign focused on Gephardt's "flip-flopping" voting record and showed a Gephardt look-alike doing forward and backward flips for the camera. Many felt the ad killed any chance Gephardt had of winning the nomination. Gephardt dropped out after winning only 13% in Michigan, despite support from the United Auto Workers. Dukakis considered selecting Gephardt as his vice presidential running mate but instead chose Texas Senator Lloyd Bentsen.

=== House leadership ===
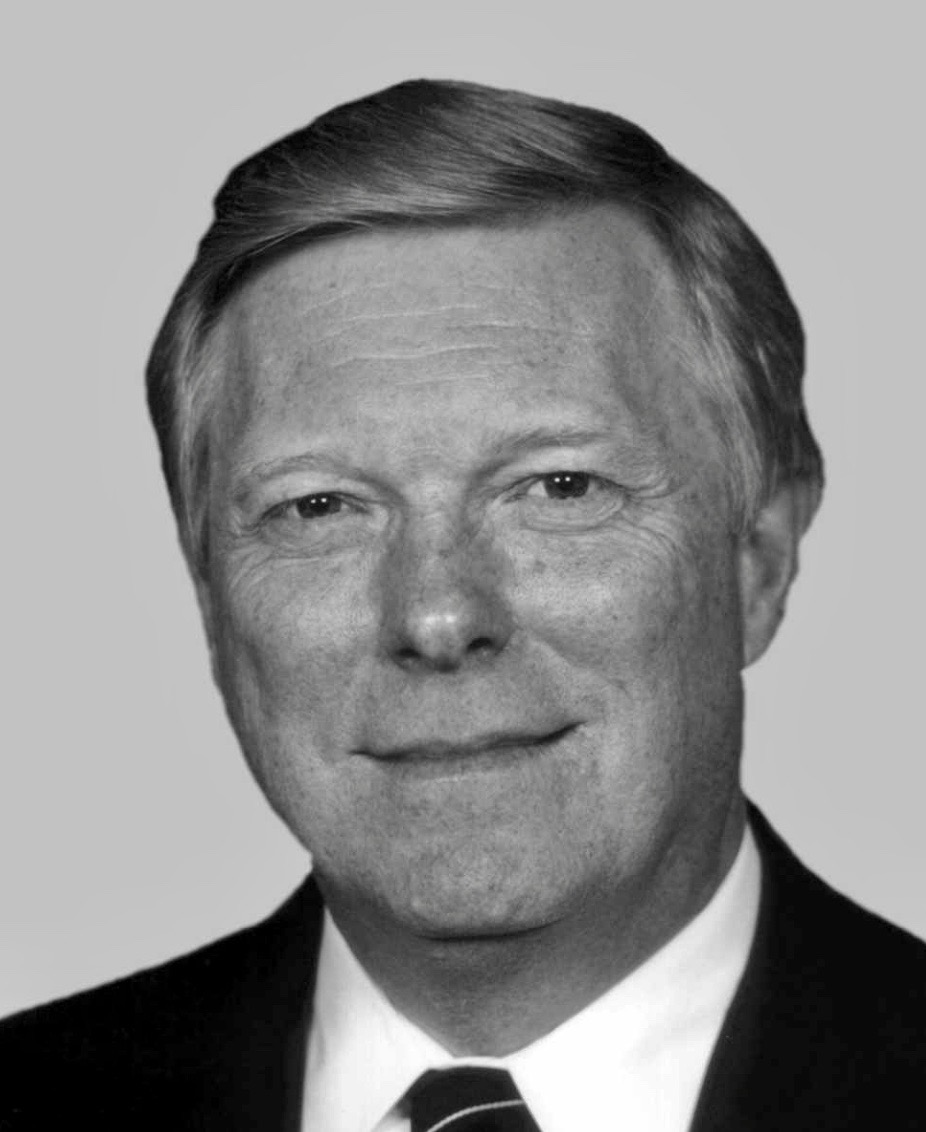
Portrait of Gephardt from the 1997 Congressional Pictorial Directory

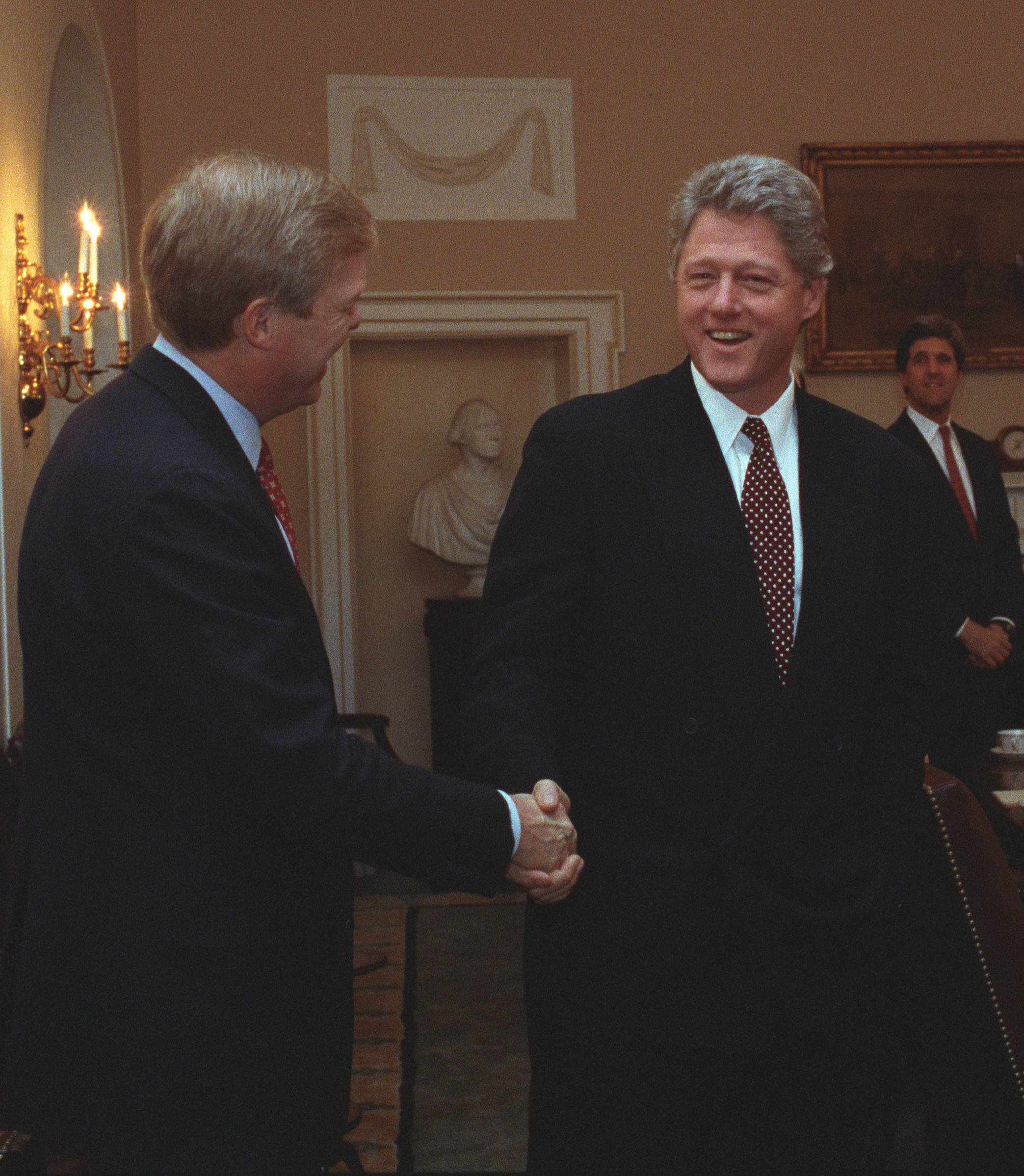
Gephardt greeting President Bill Clinton in February 1993

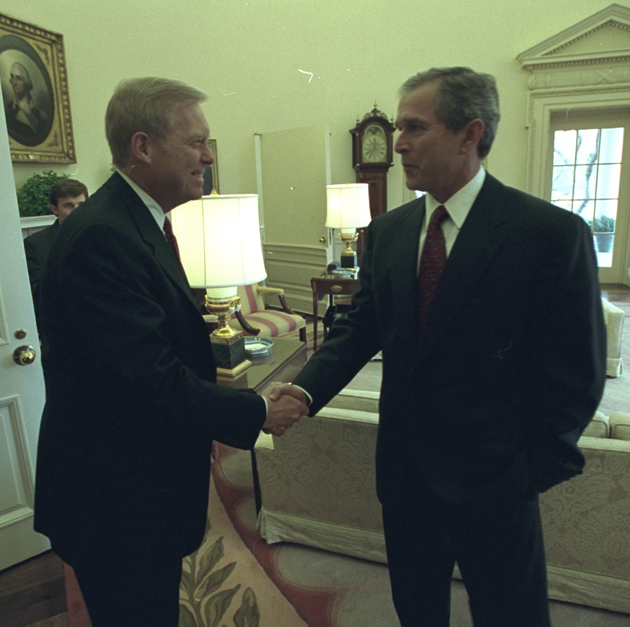
Gephardt greeting President George W. Bush in January 2001

In part due to the visibility gained from his 1988 presidential bid, Gephardt was elected majority leader by his House colleagues in June 1989, making him the second-ranking Democrat in the House, behind then-Speaker Tom Foley. Gephardt served in that position until January 1995.

After Foley was unseated in the Republican landslide of 1994 that gave the Republicans a 52-seat majority, Gephardt became the leader of the House Democrats, as minority leader, initially opposite Newt Gingrich and then, from 1999 onward, Dennis Hastert. When Gingrich faced a coup within his own party in 1997, Gephardt could have become Speaker if there had been a floor vote and he gained the support of Republican members dissatisfied with Gingrich, but Gingrich refused to resign and no vote occurred. In the 1996, 1998, and 2000 elections, Gephardt led the Democrats to gains in the House, although they did not retake the majority until 2006, after Gephardt had left Congress. Therefore, he is the first House Democratic leader who has not served as Speaker since Finis J. Garrett.

Gephardt became a prolific financial supporter of Democrats around the country in the early 1990s, assembling a team of top fundraising staff who helped him support hundreds of candidates for local and federal office. Although Gephardt worked hard for many of President Bill Clinton's programs, he and his union supporters strongly opposed NAFTA and other "free trade" programs, so Clinton relied on Republican support to pass those initiatives. During the impeachment proceedings of President Clinton, Gephardt led a walkout in the House after a censure motion was ruled irrelevant to the impeachment debate.

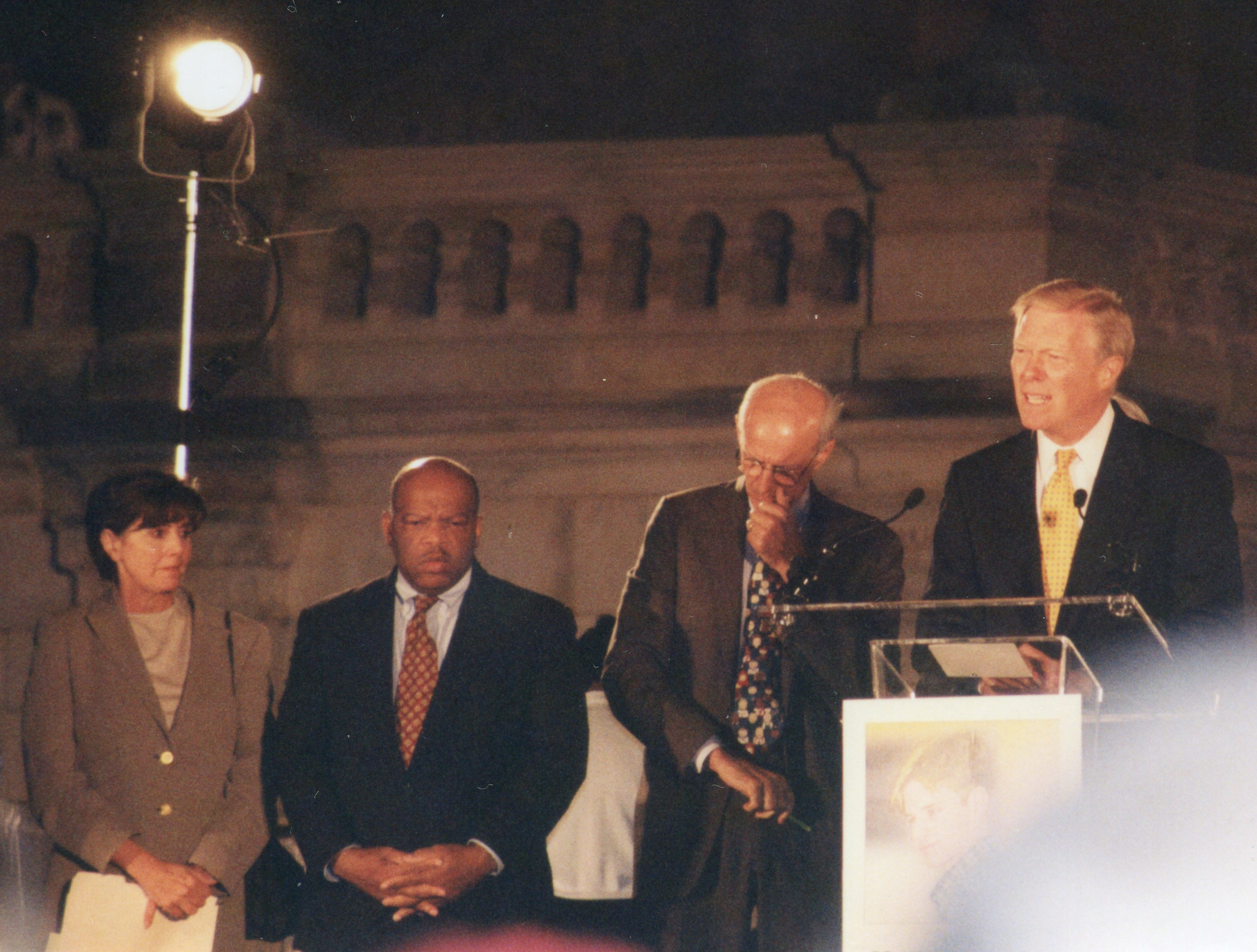
Gephardt speaking at a vigil for Matthew Shepard in 1998

In 2000, Vice President and Democratic presidential nominee Al Gore named Gephardt to his short list of possible vice presidential candidates. The other names on the short list were Indiana Senator Evan Bayh, North Carolina Senator John Edwards, Massachusetts Senator John Kerry, Connecticut Senator Joe Lieberman, and New Hampshire Governor Jeanne Shaheen. Gore eventually selected Lieberman.

In the 2002 Congressional midterm elections, Gephardt campaigned on the economy and Social Security, but the continuing resonance of the September 11 attacks, the momentum for military action against Iraq, and President George W. Bush's popularity lead to Republican gains, with the Democrats losing four House seats. Harold Ford Jr. of Tennessee called the results an "absolute blowout" and called upon Gephardt to step down, saying that it was time for "new ideas and new faces". Due to his previous success, it has been said that Gephardt would have been easily returned as Minority Leader if he had decided to stay on. However, Gephardt, who was planning to run for president in 2004, did not run for reelection as House Minority Leader, stepping down in January 2003. His leadership position was contested by the centrist Martin Frost, the outgoing Democratic Caucus Chair, and the liberal Nancy Pelosi, the Minority Whip, who was elected as Gephardt's successor. No longer having Congressional leadership duties freed Gephardt up to concentrate on a 2004 presidential bid.

=== 2004 presidential campaign ===
Gephardt announced his second run for president on January 5, 2003. His successor as Minority Leader, Nancy Pelosi, endorsed him. His campaign was notable for the high-profile coming out of his daughter Chrissy in People magazine, while she was helping him on the campaign trail, a subject they also discussed in interviews for the 2007 documentary film For the Bible Tells Me So; he has continued to be an outspoken advocate for gay rights since the campaign.

Although Republicans considered him a formidable candidate, Gephardt was seen by many as too old-fashioned and unelectable. His fundraising efforts were behind those of former Vermont Governor Howard Dean and Senators John Kerry and John Edwards, and tied with Joe Lieberman. Gephardt's support of the Iraq War resolution hurt him among liberal activists. He promoted a form of universal health care, and was backed by 21 labor unions, but did not have enough support to receive the AFL–CIO's endorsement.

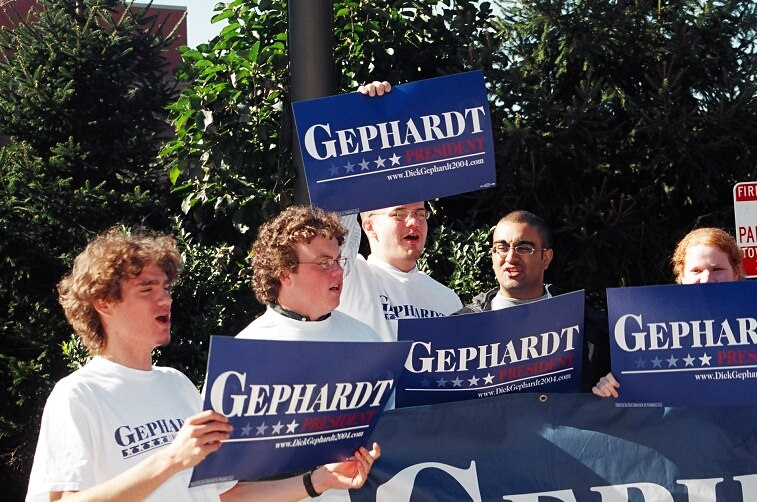
Supporters of Gephardt's campaign in 2003

Throughout early 2003, Gephardt was ahead in polling for the Iowa caucus, but by August Dean had taken the lead, his campaign fueled by antiwar activists. The Gephardt campaign was embarrassed by an early August St Louis Post-Dispatch article that revealed that 11 of the 33 "Gephardt team leaders" listed on his Iowa campaign's website actually supported other candidates or were neutral.

The race between Gephardt and Dean became negative, and took an ugly turn in October when a Gephardt staffer reportedly pushed a Dean staffer out of a meeting while calling him a "faggot". Many press at the event claimed the Dean staffer was picking a fight and that the Gephardt staffer did not make the hurtful comment. Dean chairman Joe Trippi (who worked for Gephardt in 1988) and Gephardt chairman Steve Murphy became involved in a war of words over the incident, as well as Murphy's allegation that the Dean campaign was bringing in out-of-state non-residents to participate in the caucus. In the final days of the Iowa campaign, both Dean and Gephardt faded, and they finished third and fourth, respectively. Gephardt ended his presidential campaign after that disappointing result.

After he dropped out of the presidential race, Gephardt was mentioned as a possible running mate for John Kerry. On March 7, 2004, New Mexico Governor Bill Richardson, also seen as a strong contender for the position, endorsed Gephardt for Vice President. Richardson said of Gephardt in an interview with the Associated Press, "I think he's the best candidate. There's a good regional balance with Kerry and Gephardt." Kerry announced on July 6, 2004, that he had chosen John Edwards as his running mate. On the same day, the New York Post published a headline stating that Gephardt had become Kerry's running mate. The headline was compared to the 1948 "Dewey defeats Truman" headline in the Chicago Tribune that incorrectly reported the presidential election results that year. In 2007, it was revealed in Kerry campaign adviser Bob Shrum's book No Excuses: Concessions of a Serial Campaigner that Kerry wanted to choose Gephardt but was convinced by Shrum and others to choose Edwards.

Dick Gephardt 2004 presidential campaign endorsements

Senators

- Former Senator Jean Carnahan of Missouri

Representatives

- House Minority Leader Nancy Pelosi of California
- House Minority Whip Steny Hoyer of Maryland
- Former House Majority and Minority Whip David Bonior of Michigan
- Representative Rob Andrews of New Jersey
- Representative Howard Berman of California
- Representative Sherrod Brown of Ohio
- Representative Lois Capps of California
- Representative Ben Cardin of Maryland
- Representative Jerry Costello of Illinois
- Representative Jim Clyburn of South Carolina
- Representative Chet Edwards of Texas
- Representative Lane Evans of Illinois
- Representative Bart Gordon of Tennessee
- Representative Gene Green of Texas
- Representative Joe Hoeffel of Pennsylvania
- Representative Tim Holden of Pennsylvania
- Representative Patrick J. Kennedy of Rhode Island
- Representative Jim Langevin of Rhode Island
- Representative Nita Lowey of New York
- Representative Robert Matsui of California
- Representative Karen McCarthy of Missouri
- Representative Mike McNulty of New York
- Representative Jack Murtha of Pennsylvania
- Representative Dave Obey of Wisconsin
- Representative Ed Pastor of Arizona
- Representative Silvestre Reyes of Texas
- Representative Dutch Ruppersberger of Maryland
- Representative Max Sandlin of Texas
- Representative Ike Skelton of Missouri
- Representative John Spratt of South Carolina
- Representative John Tanner of Tennessee
- Former Representative Norman D'Amours of New Hampshire
- Former Representative Butler Derrick of South Carolina
- Former Representative Ed Feighan of Ohio

Governors and Lt. Governors

- Former Governor Robert Evander McNair of South Carolina
- Former Lieutenant Governor Bob Kerr III of Oklahoma

State Legislatures leaders

- New Hampshire House of Representatives Minority Leader Peter Burling
- Rhode Island House of Representatives Majority Leader Gordon Fox

Organizations

- South Carolina Conference of Black Mayors
- American Maritime Officers
- International Association of Machinists
- International Brotherhood of Teamsters
- International Iron Workers Union
- International Longshoremen's Association
- International Union of Bricklayers
- Seafarer's International Union
- Transportation Workers Union

== Political views ==
After his election to the U.S. House in 1976, Gephardt's political views gradually moved to the left. Originally, Gephardt was strongly anti-abortion and was viewed as a social conservative. He was initially extremely critical of the U.S. Supreme Court landmark Roe v. Wade ruling that legalized abortion. He wrote on the subject in 1984:

Life is the division of human cells, a process that begins with conception. The (Supreme Court's abortion) ruling was unjust, and it is incumbent on the Congress to correct the injustice... I have always been supportive of pro-life legislation. I intend to remain steadfast on this issue.... I believe that the life of the unborn should be protected at all costs.

In 1987, when Gephardt decided to run for president, he announced that he would no longer support legislation to restrict abortion rights. He told the National Right to Life Committee; "I now do not support any Constitutional amendment pertaining to the legality of abortion." Gephardt's views on economic policy also changed over the years. He voted for Ronald Reagan's tax cuts in 1981; in the 2000s, he became a staunch opponent of similar tax cuts by President George W. Bush, saying that the enormous surplus created during the administration of Bill Clinton should have been spent on health care instead. Gephardt is widely viewed as an economic populist. He supports universal health coverage, fair trade, and progressive taxation. Although he once chaired the centrist Democratic Leadership Council, Gephardt in his later years in Congress distanced himself from the organization, finding his pro-labor views at odds with the DLC's pro-business positions.

On October 10, 2002, Gephardt was among the 81 House Democrats who voted in favor of authorizing the invasion of Iraq. He was an early supporter of the war, and cosponsor of the authorization resolution. However, three years later Gephardt said of his support for the war that "It was a mistake ... I was wrong."

== Post-congressional career ==
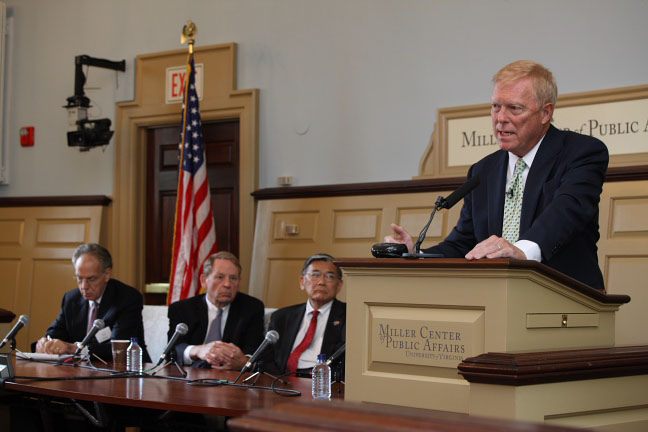
Gephardt speaking in 2009

On January 3, 2005, Gephardt's three-decade political career ended with the expiration of his 14th term in the House of Representatives. That month, Gephardt started a consulting and lobbying firm, Gephardt Group, of which he is president and CEO. Gephardt also joined the international law firm DLA Piper as strategic advisor in the government affairs practice group from June 2005 to December 2009.

In his new role as a Washington lobbyist, Gephardt, on behalf of the Republic of Turkey, had been actively lobbying against the House resolution condemning the Armenian genocide of 1915 in the Ottoman Empire. While supportive of the resolution while in Congress, he later contended in his new role that facts needed to be better known before any position could be taken on this historical controversy. Gephardt served on the board of directors of the Embarq Corporation from June 2007 to July 1, 2009, when he became a member of the board of directors of CenturyLink, Embarq's successor corporation. Gephardt also serves as a director of Centene Corporation, Ford Motor Company, Spirit Aerosystems Holdings, Inc., and United States Steel Corporation. He joined Ford's board in 2009.

In July 2007, Gephardt endorsed Hillary Clinton for president, leading some to speculate that he was interested in running for vice president in 2008. DLA Piper become a major donor to Clinton's campaign, donating about $190,000. Gephardt was mentioned during the summer of 2008 as a possible vice-presidential choice for eventual nominee Senator Barack Obama. A collection of Gephardt's congressional documents, dating from 1994 to 2004, was processed from 2006 to 2007 by the Missouri Historical Society for academic use, with a grant through the Institute of Museum and Library Services. In 2005, Washington University in St. Louis inaugurated the Richard A. Gephardt Institute of Public Service (now the Gephardt Institute for Civic and Community Engagement), which educates students for life-long engaged citizenship and civic leadership. Since 2005, Gephardt has been a consultant to Goldman Sachs and DLA Piper. Since 2007 he has been a consultant to FTI Consulting.

In 2007, Gephardt began serving on the advisory board of the Extend Health insurance company, and then became a member of its board of directors. In 2009, Gephardt advised UnitedHealth Group, one of America's largest private insurers, in waging a strong campaign against a public option for national health care. In 2010, Gephardt was elected chair of the Board of Trustees of The Scripps Research Institute, a nonprofit institute focusing on biomedical research.

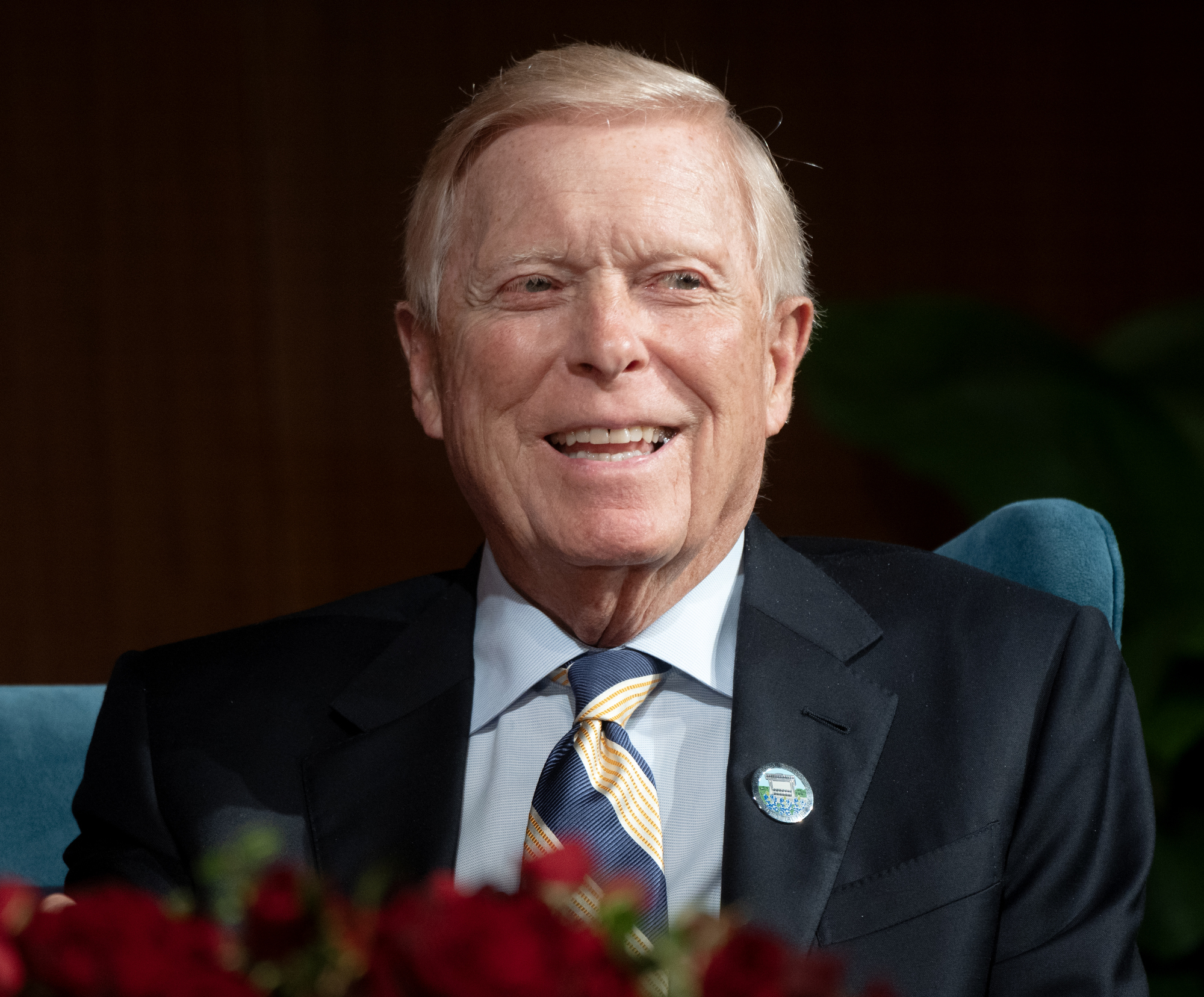
Gephardt at the LBJ Presidential Library in 2024

Gephardt has been significantly involved with the pharmaceutical and healthcare industries. In addition to a large lobbying contract with the Medicines Company, he serves as chair of the Council for American Medical Innovation (CAMI), formed by and affiliated with PhRMA. In this capacity he hired his own firm to lobby for the organization, to push to extend patents and block generic drugs from the market. In 2016, Gephardt also co-founded a Direct primary care group called SolidaritUS Health, with the goal of increasing the accessibility of quality healthcare to working families.

Gephardt has also served as a lobbyist for Boeing. He is a labor consultant for Spirit Aerosystems and sits on its board of directors. In these roles, Gephardt has presided over an aggressive anti-union campaign that has bewildered many of his traditional political allies. In July 2011, Spirit Aerosystems walked out of negotiations with the union that represents its engineering, technical and professional workforce. The union subsequently voted down the company's last contract offer, with 96.5% voting no. The company did not change its contract offer significantly after this rejection and relations with its workforce have been contentious ever since. With negotiations at a standstill, production schedules for 2011 and 2012 were threatened. Around mid-2023 Spirit Aerosystems agreed to a new contract with its workers at the Wichita, Kansas plant. Key provisions in the contract include increased pay, workers being allowed to keep their current health plans, and removal of mandatory overtime requirements.

In October 2022, Gephardt, along with Republican former Massachusetts Lt. Gov. Kerry Healey, launched the Council for Responsible Social Media, a project of nonprofit organization Issue One, which he had already been involved with as a member of its ReFormers Caucus. Gephardt and Healey serve as co-chairs of the project, which focuses on addressing the harmful influence social media can have on children, communities, and national security. In May 2024, Gephardt gave the commencement address and received an honorary degree at Iona University in New Rochelle, New York.

== See also ==
- Electoral history of Dick Gephardt
- Revolving door (politics)

U.S. House of Representatives
Preceded by Leonor Sullivan	Member of the U.S. House of Representatives from Missouri's 3rd congressional district 1977–2005	Succeeded by Russ Carnahan
Preceded by Tom Foley	House Majority Leader; 1989–1995	Succeeded by Dick Armey
Preceded by Bob Michel	House Minority Leader; 1995–2003	Succeeded by Nancy Pelosi
Party political offices
Preceded by Gillis Long	Chair of the House Democratic Caucus; 1985–1989	Succeeded by Bill Gray
New office	Chair of the Democratic Leadership Council; 1985–1986	Succeeded by Chuck Robb
Preceded by Tom Foley	House Democratic Deputy Leader; 1989–1995	Succeeded by David Bonior
Preceded by Tom Foley	House Democratic Leader; 1995–2003	Succeeded by Nancy Pelosi
Preceded by Susan Collins; Bill Frist	Response to the State of the Union address 2001, 2002; Served alongside: Tom Daschle (2001)	Succeeded by Gary Locke
U.S. order of precedence (ceremonial)
Preceded by Kevin McCarthy as Former Speaker of the U.S. House of Representatives	Order of precedence of the United States as Former House Majority Leader	Succeeded by Dick Armey as Former House Majority Leader
