= For the Bible Tells Me So =

- Promotional film poster
- Directed by: Daniel G. Karslake
- Written by: Daniel G. Karslake; Nancy Kennedy
- Produced by: Daniel G. Karslake
- Edited by: Nancy Kennedy
- Music by: Scott Anderson
- Distributed by: First Run Features
- Release date: October 5, 2007
- Running time: 98 minutes
- Country: United States
- Language: English
- Box office: $312,751

For the Bible Tells Me So is a 2007 American documentary film directed by Daniel G. Karslake about homosexuality and its perceived conflict with Christianity, as well as various interpretations of what the Bible says about sexual orientation. The film premiered at the 2007 Sundance Film Festival.

== Overview ==
The film includes lengthy interview segments with several sets of religious parents (including former House Majority Leader Dick Gephardt and his wife, Jane, and the parents of Bishop V. Gene Robinson) regarding their personal experiences raising homosexual children, and also interviews with those (adult) children.

The film features an animated segment, "Is Homosexuality a Choice?", in which a summary of the then-current scientific theories about sexual orientation is given, such as homosexual behavior in animals and sexual orientation being caused by genes. It is directed by Powerhouse Animation Studios and narrated by Don LaFontaine in one of his last non-trailer narration roles.

== People profiled in film ==
- Gene Robinson
- Jake Reitan
- Chrissy Gephardt
- Tonia Poteat
- Mary Lou Wallner

== Critical reception ==
The film received positive reviews from critics. The review aggregator, Rotten Tomatoes, reported that the film received 98% positive reviews, based on 43 reviews. Metacritic reported the film had an average score of 73 out of 100, based on 11 reviews.

Following its premiere in competition at the Sundance Film Festival, For the Bible Tells Me So went on to win several prestigious festival awards, including the Katherine Bryan Edwards Human Rights Prize at the Full Frame Documentary Film Festival, and the Best Documentary Audience Awards at the Seattle International Film Festival the Provincetown International Film Festival, Outfest, the Milwaukee Film Festival, and many others.

On November 19, 2007, For the Bible Tells Me So was named by the Academy of Motion Picture Arts and Sciences as one of 15 films on its documentary feature Oscar shortlist. However, it did not make the final list of five nominated films as announced on January 22, 2008.
