= American Center for Voting Rights =

American non-profit organisation

- Formation: March 2005
- Dissolved: May 2007
- Founder and general counsel: Mark F. "Thor" Hearne
- Executive director: Robin DeJarnette
- Chairman: Brian Lunde
- Board member: Pat Rogers
- Website: www.ac4vr.com

The American Center for Voting Rights (ACVR) was a non-profit organization founded by Mark F. "Thor" Hearne that operated from March 2005 to May 2007 and pushed for laws to reduce voter intimidation and voter fraud, and supported requiring photo ID for voters.

== Overview ==
ACVR was founded in Midlothian, Virginia, as "a non-partisan 501(c)(3) legal and education organization committed to defending the rights of voters and working to increase public confidence in the fairness and outcome of elections" and declared that it did not "support or endorse any political party or candidate."

Its lobbying arm, the American Center for Voting Rights Legislative Fund, was chartered as a 501(c)(4) non-stock corporation.

Election law expert Richard L. Hasen noted that it was "the only prominent non-governmental organization claiming that voter fraud is a major problem," and called the center a Republican Party front group whose support of a photo ID requirement was intended to suppress the minority vote.

The ACVR was dissolved in May 2007, after an extensive investigation by the United States Department of Justice found no appreciable voter fraud. The web pages ac4vr.com and AmericanCenterForVotingRights.com were taken down.

== Leadership ==
ACVR's officers included:

- Mark F. "Thor" Hearne, founder and general counsel. Former vice president and director of election operations for the Republican National Lawyers Association. Served as national election counsel to George W. Bush's 2004 campaign and Missouri counsel to his 2000 campaign. Founded ACVR with encouragement from Karl Rove and the White House. Helped Missouri Senator Delbert Lee Scott draft Missouri's voter ID law, which was later ruled unconstitutional.
- Robin DeJarnette, executive director. Founder and executive director of the Virginia Conservative Action PAC.
- Brian Lunde, chairman. A former executive director of the Democratic National Committee who ran Democrats for Bush in 2004.
- Alex Vogel, a former Republican National Committee lawyer whose consulting firm was paid $75,000 for several months' service by Vogel as the center's Executive Director.
- Pat Rogers, board member. An attorney from New Mexico who had handled Federal civil rights cases, he pushed Justice Department officials to fire U.S. Attorney David Iglesias for inattention to voter fraud. This dismissal fell under scrutiny as part of a larger, allegedly improper pattern of political influence.

== Activities ==
ACVR endorsed the September 2005 recommendations of the Commission on Federal Election Reform, which was co-chaired by former president Jimmy Carter and former Secretary of State James Baker. Among its publications on the topic of voter fraud were "Democrat operatives far more involved in voter intimidation and suppression in 2004 than Republicans," "Vote Fraud, Intimidation & Suppression - The 2004 Presidential Election," and "Ohio Election Activities and Observations."

On March 22, 2005, a few days after the organization was formed, ACVR officials were called to testify by Republican members of Congress before a House Administration Committee hearing held by Rep. Bob Ney (R-OH). Hearne was called as a witness to discuss election reform issues and the implementation of the federal Help America Vote Act during the 2004 Presidential election. U.S. Senator Kit Bond (R-Missouri), who described the group as a non-partisan, voting rights advocacy group, testified and submitted the ACVR's report on 2004 election irregularities in Ohio, which documented, among other incidents, the registration of voters named "Mary Poppins", "Dick Tracy", and "Jive F. Turkey." According to court records in the criminal prosecution of Chad Staton in Defiance County, Ohio, individuals registering these fictional voters were paid money and in at least one instance, crack cocaine. The organization involved in this effort was called "Project Vote," and the fraud was perpetrated by a registrations volunteer.

== Dissolution and controversies ==
The ACVR was dissolved in May 2007, and the web pages ac4vr.com and AmericanCenterForVotingRights.com were taken down.

The dissolution of ACVR came several weeks after the Election Assistance Commission issued a report that said the pervasiveness of fraud was open to debate. "The DoJ devoted unprecedented resources to ferreting out polling-place fraud over five years and appears to have found not a single prosecutable case across the country," Slate reported.

Several states have adopted laws requiring voters to provide some form of government-issued identification before casting a ballot. The strictest of these requirements is the Indiana photo-ID requirement which was challenged by the Indiana Democratic Party and the American Civil Liberties Union. This law was upheld by the U.S. Court of Appeals for the Seventh Circuit.

The U.S. Supreme Court upheld an Arizona voter ID law against a similar challenge. Similar laws have been upheld by state courts in Pennsylvania, but struck down in Missouri and Georgia.
