= Susan Ford Wiltshire =

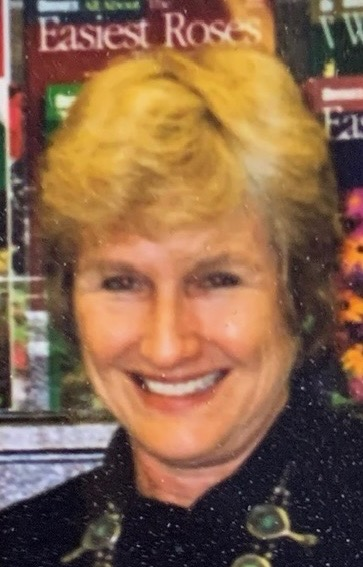
- Wiltshire in 2004
- Born: 1941 (age 84–85)

Academic background
- Education: University of Texas, Austin (BA), Columbia University (MA), Columbia University (Ph.D.)
- Thesis: Poetry in the Consolatio Philosophiae of Boethius (1967)

Academic work
- Discipline: Classical Studies
- Sub-discipline: Latin Poetry, Classical Reception
- Website: https://susanfwiltshire.com/

Susan Ford Wiltshire (born 1941) is an American classical scholar, poet, and essayist. Her academic work focuses on Latin poetry, particularly that of Vergil, and Classical Reception Studies, particularly in the early United States and the American South. President Bill Clinton appointed Wiltshire to the advisory council of the National Endowment for the Humanities, on which she served from 1997–2002.

== Education ==
Wiltshire received her Ph.D. in Greek and Latin from Columbia University in 1967. Her doctoral thesis was entitled "Poetry in the Consolatio Philosophiae of Boethius." Wiltshire received a master's degree from Columbia in 1964 and her BA in Latin from the University of Texas, Austin in 1963.

== Career ==
Wiltshire taught Classics at the University of Illinois, Urbana-Champaign for two years before becoming the director of the Honors Program and Assistant Professor of English at Fisk University in 1969. In 1971 she became Assistant Professor of Classics at Vanderbilt University, where she became Full Professor in 1989. She retired in 2007. Besides serving on the advisory council of the National Endowment for the Humanities, Wiltshire received numerous fellowships, including a Woodrow Wilson Fellowship and two research grants from the National Endowment for the Humanities, as well as awards for her teaching and service at Vanderbilt and an honorary doctorate of Humane Letters from Kenyon College in 1998.

Wiltshire has written three academic monographs, a memoir of her brother's AIDS diagnosis and eventual death, and several books of essays, fiction, and poems. Her first book was Public and Private in Vergil's Aeneid (1989), which assesses how the poet maintains the tension between personal and civic life that is essential for the common good. Also among her notable publications is her book Greece, Rome, and the Bill of Rights, which traces the influence of Greek and Roman civic ideals on the first ten amendments to the United States Constitution (1992). Classical Nashville: Athens of the South (1996), which Wiltshire and co-authors Christine Kreyling, Wesley Paine, and Charles W. Waterfield, Jr. published for the bicentennial of the state of Tennessee, surveys the influence of Classical architecture on many of Nashville's buildings, such as the War Memorial Auditorium and that city's full-scale replica of the Parthenon. A special issue of the Southern Humanities Review that Wiltshire edited collected essays on "the Classical Tradition in the South."

Wiltshire played an active role in advocating for women's equity at Vanderbilt. This activism led to the establishment of Vanderbilt's Women's Studies program in 1973 (now the Department of Gender and Sexuality Studies). Every year, this department awards two prizes in Wiltshire's honor for undergraduate and graduate essays on "a topic concerning gender, race, ethnicity, class, and/or sexuality." Wiltshire recounted the strategies she and her colleagues employed in her essay "A Letter to my Daughter: How We Made Our Mark on Women’s Equity at Vanderbilt."

== Selected works ==
=== Academic books and edited volumes ===
- The Usefulness of Classical Learning in the Eighteenth Century [editor] (University Park, Pa.: American Philological Association, 1976)
- Public and Private in Vergil’s Aeneid (University of Massachusetts Press, 1989)
- Greece, Rome, and the Bill of Rights (University of Oklahoma Press, 1992).
- Classical Nashville: Athens of the South [co-author] (Vanderbilt University Press, 1996)
- Athena’s Disguises: Mentors in Everyday Life (Westminster John Knox Press, 1998)
- Prairie Laureate: The Collected Poems of Robert Lee Brothers (Austin, Eakin Press, 1998)
- Classical Considerations: Useful Wisdom from Greece and Rome (Bolchazi-Carducci Press, 2005)

=== Journal articles ===
- “The Prison Poetry of Dietrich Bonhoeffer,” Religion in Life (Autumn, 1969) 522-534.
- “Thomas Jefferson and John Adams on the Classics,” Arion 6 (Spring, 1967) 116-132.
- “Sam Houston and the Iliad,” Tennessee Historical Quarterly 32.3 (Fall, 1973) 249-254.
- “Jefferson, Calhoun, and the Slavery Debate: The Classics and the Two Minds of the South,” Southern Humanities Review (Special Issue, Fall, 1977) 33-40.
- “Aristotle in America,” Humanities 8.1 (1987) 8-11.
- “On Authoring and Authority,” Southern Humanities Review 21.3 (1987) 231-235.

=== Memoir, poetry and fiction ===
- Seasons of Grief and Grace: a Sister’s Story of AIDS (Vanderbilt University Press, 1994)
- Windmills and Bridges: Poems Near and Far (Eakin Press, 2002)
- “Colonus, A Novella,” in The Long View (2015) 194-243.
- The Long View: Essays, Poems, Stories (Cordelia Hollis Publishing, 2015)
- Penelope Returning: Collected Poems (Cordelia Hollis Publishing, 2021)
