= Freedom Rides Museum =

- Montgomery Greyhound Bus Station
- U.S. National Register of Historic Places
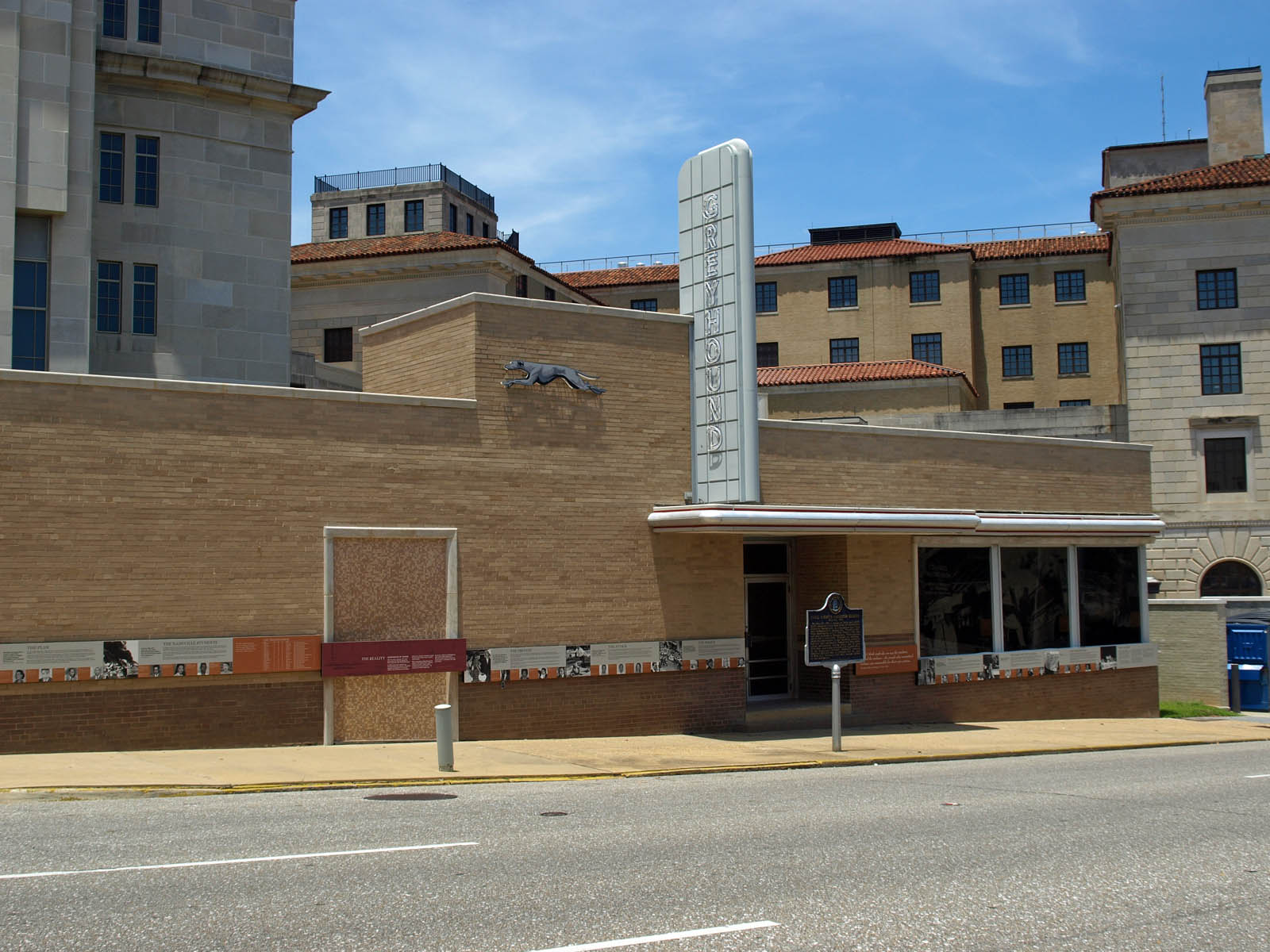
- The Greyhound Bus Station in 2009

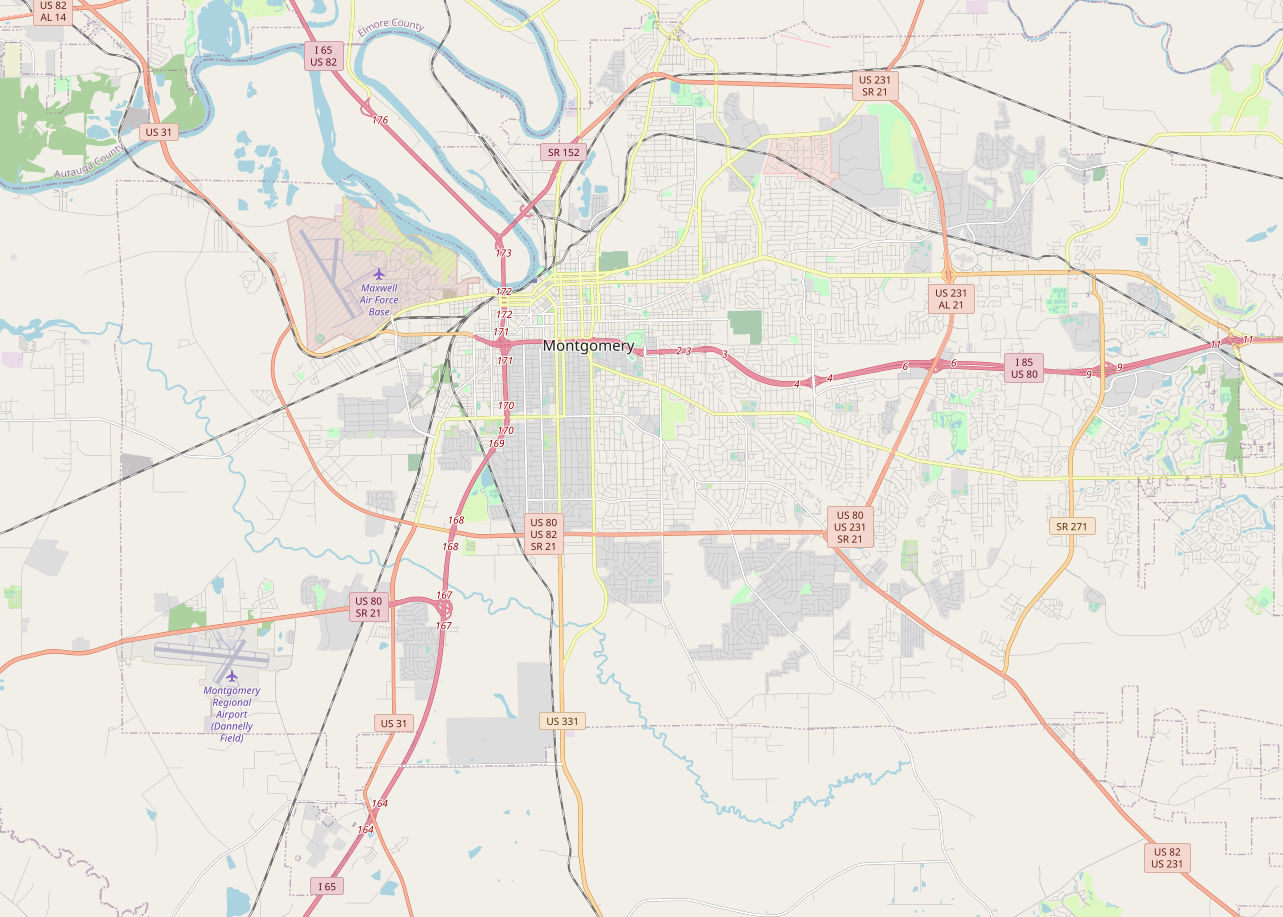
- Location within Montgomery, Alabama Location within Alabama Location within the United States
- Location: 210 S. Court St., Montgomery, Alabama
- Coordinates: 32°22′29″N 86°18′33″W
- Built: 1951
- Architect: W.S. Arrasmith
- Architectural style: Streamline moderne
- NRHP reference No.: 11000298
- Added to NRHP: May 16, 2011

The Freedom Rides Museum is located at 210 South Court Street in Montgomery, Alabama, in the building which was until 1995 the Montgomery Greyhound Bus Station. It was the site of a violent attack on participants in the 1961 Freedom Ride during the Civil Rights Movement. The May 1961 assaults, carried out by a mob of white protesters who confronted the civil rights activists, "shocked the nation and led the Kennedy Administration to side with civil rights protesters for the first time."

The property is no longer used as a bus station, but the building was saved from demolition and its façade has been restored. The site was leased by the Alabama Historical Commission and a historical marker was located in front of the building. In 2011, a museum was opened inside the building, and it was listed on the National Register of Historic Places. The museum won a national preservation award from the National Trust for Historic Preservation in 2012.

== Construction ==
In 1950, Greyhound Lines retained architect W.S. Arrasmith to build a new bus station in Montgomery, Alabama, to replace an earlier station on North Court Street. Incorporating a streamlined style and vertical "Greyhound" name in neon, it is an unassuming example of Greyhound bus stations in that time, derived from a standard plan and built for $300,000. The station opened in August, 1951.

The bus station is significant only in its relationship to the events of the single day of May 20, 1961. The building had a door labelled "Colored Entrance"; African Americans entered through it directly into the bus bay, accessing interior of the segregated terminal from the rear. The site at 210 Court Street placed the station directly behind Montgomery's U.S. District Courthouse on Lee Street.

== Freedom Ride to and through Montgomery ==
Freedom Riders were civil rights activists who rode interstate buses into the segregated southern United States, in 1961 and subsequent years, to challenge the non-enforcement of the United States Supreme Court decisions which had ruled segregated public buses to be unconstitutional.

As organized by the Congress of Racial Equality (CORE) for May 1961, the rides would have mixed pairs of riders sit side by side on Greyhound and Trailways buses crossing the American South from Washington, D.C. to New Orleans, between May 4 and May 17. Alabama stops were planned for Anniston, Birmingham, and Montgomery, during the final leg that ran from Atlanta, Georgia to New Orleans.

=== Violence in Anniston and Birmingham ===
In Anniston, a mob of angry whites violently attacked the Greyhound bus and set it on fire; the riders were severely beaten. The Trailways bus arrived an hour later and was boarded in Anniston by Ku Klux Klan members who beat up the Freedom Riders. It was also attacked in Birmingham, and several riders (including James Peck) were beaten in front of the press. Reports of the violence reached U.S. Attorney General Robert F. Kennedy, who urged restraint on the part of Freedom Riders and sent an assistant, John Seigenthaler, to Birmingham. CORE agreed to halt the Freedom Ride in Birmingham on May 14, with the remaining riders flying to New Orleans.

=== The Nashville Student Movement continues the Ride ===
Diane Nash, of the Nashville Student Movement (and a member of the Student Nonviolent Coordinating Committee) and others were undeterred, and 21 young students, including John Lewis, took the place of the original riders for a leg of the Freedom Ride to Montgomery (the ultimate destination was Jackson, Mississippi). All but one (Ruby Doris Smith, from Atlanta) were from Nashville, Tennessee, and many were from Fisk University. Greyhound had initially refused to allow any of their drivers to drive the bus; after an angry intervention by Robert F. Kennedy, and with an escort of state troopers provided by Floyd Mann, the Alabama Director of Public Safety, the bus left Birmingham for Montgomery on May 20.

=== Violence in Montgomery and federal involvement ===
The riders were left unescorted by the state troopers as they reached Montgomery city limits, and arrived at the bus station at 10:23 AM. There they were met by a crowd of violent white protesters, including women and children. Several were injured in the attack, including Robert Kennedy's assistant John Seigenthaler, who had followed the bus in his car: attempting to rescue two white female riders, he was hit over the head with a metal pipe and "lay unconscious on the ground for half an hour." Floyd Mann, who had stationed his troopers a few blocks away despite lacking jurisdiction, stepped in to protect William Barbee, who was to remain paralyzed and died an early death as a result of his beating. Mann fired his gun in the air, yelling, "'There'll be no killing here today.' A white attacker raised his bat for a final blow" at an unconscious Jim Zwerg who was accompanied by John Lewis. Mann put his gun to the man's head. "One more swing," he said, "and you're dead." Mann's troopers soon arrived at the terminal to restore order.

On Sunday, May 21, Martin Luther King Jr., C.K. Steele, and SCLC officers came to support the Freedom Riders. That evening, they and the riders joined the evening service in Ralph Abernathy's First Baptist Church on North Ripley Street while some 3000 angry protesters yelled outside, burning a car and threatening to burn the church. From inside the church, King telephoned Robert Kennedy, who urged the activists to "cool down," a proposal refused first by Diane Nash, and then by James Farmer (on behalf of CORE) and King. Kennedy had sent 500 U.S. Marshals, headed by United States Deputy Attorney General Byron White. Airborne troops were on standby at Fort Benning, just across the Georgia state line. The Kennedy Administration's decision that it would send US troops to restore order was protested by city and state officials. The marshals, with the help of Floyd Mann and his state troopers, managed to keep the mob at bay; it was finally dispersed with the help of the National Guard at midnight.

On the morning of Wednesday, May 24, the Freedom Ride resumed, with riders boarding buses from Montgomery bound for Jackson, Mississippi. A first group of riders left from the Trailways station, and a second boarded a mid-day Greyhound departure. In Jackson, the students, which by now included Nashville Student Movement activists Bernard Lafayette, James Bevel, and others, were arrested as they attempted to desegregate the "Black" and "White" waiting rooms in the bus terminal.

As a result of the unrest and the nationwide publicity generated by the Freedom Rides, in late May Robert Kennedy was able to successfully petition the Interstate Commerce Commission to adopt stronger regulations and desegregate interstate transportation. The bus station attack had also resulted in a court order against the Ku Klux Klan by Judge Frank M. Johnson, who served in the courthouse directly behind the Greyhound station. The courthouse was named for Johnson in 1992.

== Closure and preservation ==
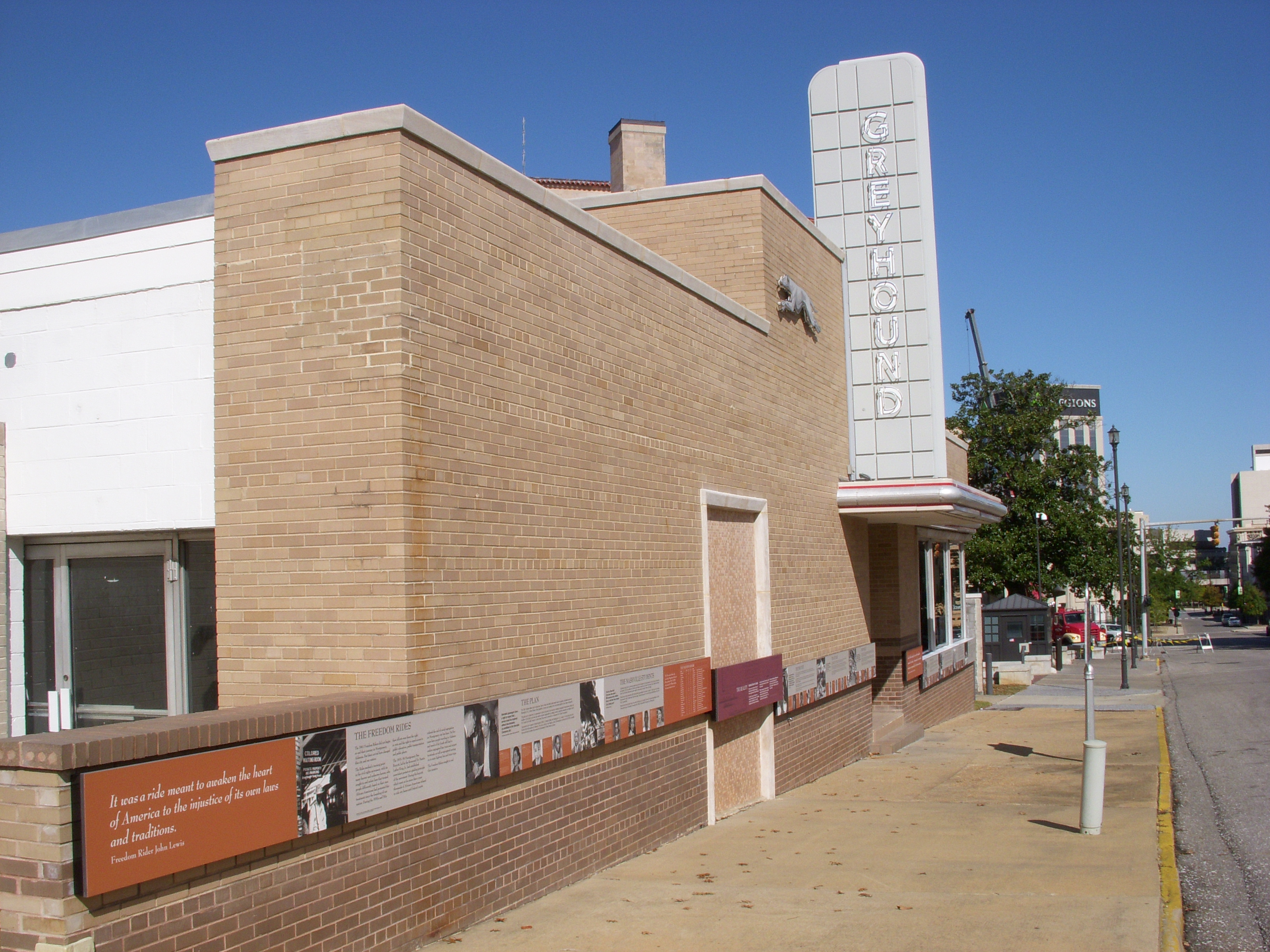
In 2008, exterior panels were added that illustrate the events of May 1961

The Greyhound station was closed in 1995, and its history is indicated by a historic marker placed there in 1996. The station fell into disrepair, and plans to open a museum were delayed repeatedly, leading to accusations of racial prejudice against the Alabama Historical Commission. The internationally renowned architectural firm Ralph Appelbaum Associates produced a design plan for the building. The site was noted as one of Montgomery's tourist attractions though the building could not be entered.

In 2008, descriptive panels were added across the front exterior of the building. In images and text, the fifteen panels illustrated the events of May 1961, but the interior remained inaccessible.

In 2009, the services of Cohen Carnaggio Reynolds, architects out of Birmingham, AL, were retained by the Alabama Historical Commission to rehabilitate and refurbish the interior of the bus station into The Freedom Rides Museum.

Since 2011, the station has housed the Freedom Rides Museum.

In May 2011, commemorating the fiftieth anniversary of the riot at the bus station, a 3,000-square-foot (280 m^{2}) museum was opened in the presence of Jim Zwerg. The building was also listed on the National Register of Historic Places on May 16, 2011. Previous owners had covered the original segregated entrance with bricks and torn down a sign indicating where non-whites were supposed to enter. The museum opted not to restore these features, but it did choose to highlight the building's segregated design in its exhibitions.

In May 2021 the museum unveiled a restored Greyhound bus in honor of the 60th anniversary of the Freedom Riders. The 1957 model bus was in service during the Freedom Rides in 1961.

In early March 2025, the Trump administration's DOGE faction recommended the GSA sell the museum property, part of the National Parks Civil Rights Trail, one of the hundreds of "non-core" properties that DOGE is attempting to remove. Area Congresspeople lodged their strong opposition.

== See also ==
- Freedom Riders National Monument, Anniston, Alabama
