= White House Conference on Civil Rights =

1966 conference

On June 1 and 2, 1966, President Lyndon Johnson held the White House Conference on Civil Rights—a landmark of a conference that advocated for legislation in the civil rights era. The conference was built on the momentum of the Civil Rights Act of 1964 and the Voting Rights Act of 1965, as its aim was to address discrimination against African Americans.

One year before the conference took place, President Johnson promised its occurrence in his commencement address at Howard University. In the commencement, he stated that this conference would be titled "To Fulfill These Rights," and would execute the constitutional rights of African Americans that have been wrongfully denied. A year later, this promise was fulfilled at the White House Conference on Civil Rights with over 2,500 participants, representing all major civil rights groups. That is, all major civil rights groups except the Student Nonviolent Coordinating Committee (SNCC), which boycotted the conference. This boycott occurred due to the belief that Johnson's administration was not genuine in their claims to insure the rights of African Americans. This concern was proven wrong, as the conference focused on four areas of discussion regarding equal access to the following topics: the justice system, financial stability, residence, and schooling. Out of the conference came a hundred-page report that called for "legislation to ban racial discrimination in housing and the administration of criminal justice, and...suggested increased federal spending to improve the quality of housing and education."

Regarding the justice system, proposals were made to make improvements on civil rights laws. One of the problems seen was that civil rights crimes were not taken seriously enough, as they were only regarded in state courts. Thus, this conference brought forth the idea to make civil rights cases matters of the federal court. Further, legislation was proposed to set standards for jury selection in both state and federal courts to limit jury discrimination. Legislation was also suggested to use the Law Enforcement Assistance Act of 1965 to begin a federal program. This federal program would enforce the Attorney General to provide funds for ethical police practice. Lastly, a bill was proposed to enforce prisoner rehabilitation, where work-release programs would be enforced.

Second to the justice system, another concern the conference regarded was African Americans having financial stability, as job insecurity within the black community was high. It was suggested that a Metropolitan Job Council and a Rural Jobs Task Force were implemented to ensure jobs were being distributed among people of both urban and rural areas. Other job programs were also proposed such as: jobs for young African Americans, assured jobs for those who lacked skills, and federalizing the U.S. Employment Service (USES) in order to establish more funding for jobs.

In order to ensure housing was constitutionally being provided for African Americans, it was discussed that an Executive Order be established to enforce desegregation within the housing industry. Along several other proposals, it was executed that a housing project be implemented to enact a federal law that enacts equal housing opportunities.

The education goals of this conference included imposing Title VI of the Civil Rights Act of 1964 to its full potential—a federal law that "prohibits discrimination against or otherwise excluding individuals on the basis of race, color, or national origin." This enforcement means completely reorganizing the educational system through first appointing a Presidential Task Force to make the standards for such changes. Some of these changes included: changing teaching techniques, curriculum, and objectives.

Although this conference was the first of its kind by a president, the proposed changes do not show the power of this conference—it is the results. Two years after the conference, the Fair Housing Act 1968 was established. This act was originally established to prohibit "discrimination on the basis of race, color, religion, or national origin" in consequence of the conference. From here, the Act has since then been amended to include anti-discrimination measures on the basis of sex, household composition, and disabilities. Overall, the White House Conference on Civil Rights is a landmark conference that has greatly impacted the past, present, and future.

== See also ==
- Chicago Open Housing Movement
