= William Moyer =

American activist (1933–2002)

Bill Moyer (September 17, 1933 – October 21, 2002) was a United States social change activist who was a principal organizer in the 1966 Chicago Open Housing Movement. He was an author, and a founding member of the Movement for a New Society.

== Chicago Open Housing Movement ==
Initially trained as an engineer, Moyer was introduced to the philosophy and practice of nonviolence by Quaker friends, and completed a degree in social work. He became involved in campaigns for civil rights and open housing integration, working and organizing in the early and mid-1960s with the Chicago branch of the Quaker-based American Friends Service Committee along with Kale Williams, civil rights activist Bernard Lafayette, and others. Then, in 1966, he joined with James Bevel, Martin Luther King Jr. and the other leaders of the Southern Christian Leadership Conference (SCLC) during the Chicago Movement.

James Bevel, who strategized and directed that action, credits Moyer with influencing him to center the Chicago Movement on open housing.

== Further social movements ==
Over the next decade, Moyer was involved in the SCLC's 1969 Poor People's Campaign in Washington, D.C., nonviolent blockades of arms shipments to Bangladesh (1971) and to Vietnam (1972), support for the American Indian Movement occupation at Wounded Knee, South Dakota (1973), and a nuclear power plant blockade at Seabrook, New Hampshire (1977).

It was during the nonviolent blockade of the Seabrook Station Nuclear Power Plant, which involved the arrest of 1,414 individuals (most charges were later dropped), that Moyer recognised the need for social change activists to understand the dynamics behind movement success. In particular, the need to openly address the contradiction that activists often perceive the normal signs of campaign progress as signs of failure.

Moyer developed the Movement Action Plan (MAP) to achieve this end. Since its development it has been used to train hundreds of activists, most notably in the United States, Australia, Canada and Europe.

After the fall of the Berlin wall in 1989, Moyer participated in many workshops in Eastern Europe about nonviolence and social change. In the mid-1980s, he moved to San Francisco, California, where he began to explore Transpersonal psychology and continued his participation in the Friends meeting there. He also developed a workshop called "Creating Peaceful Relationships" based on his realizations regarding dominator cultures.

Moyer's book Doing Democracy (New Society Publishers), co-authored by JoAnn McAllister, Mary Lou Finley and Steven Soifer, summarises his theories of social change with case studies from the Civil Rights Movement, anti-nuclear, gay and lesbian, breast cancer and Global Justice movements.
