= Movement Action Plan =

The Movement Action Plan is a strategic model for waging nonviolent social movements developed by Bill Moyer, a US social change activist. The MAP, initially developed by Moyer in the late 1970s, uses case studies of successful social movements to illustrate eight distinct stages through social movements' progress, and is designed to help movement activists choose the most effective tactics and strategies to match their movements' current stage.

== The eight stages ==
Moyer describes the eight stages as:

1. Critical social problem exists
2. Prove failure of official institutions
3. Ripening conditions
4. Take off
5. Perception of failure
6. Majority public opinion
7. Success
8. Continuation
