= Daviston, Alabama =

- Town
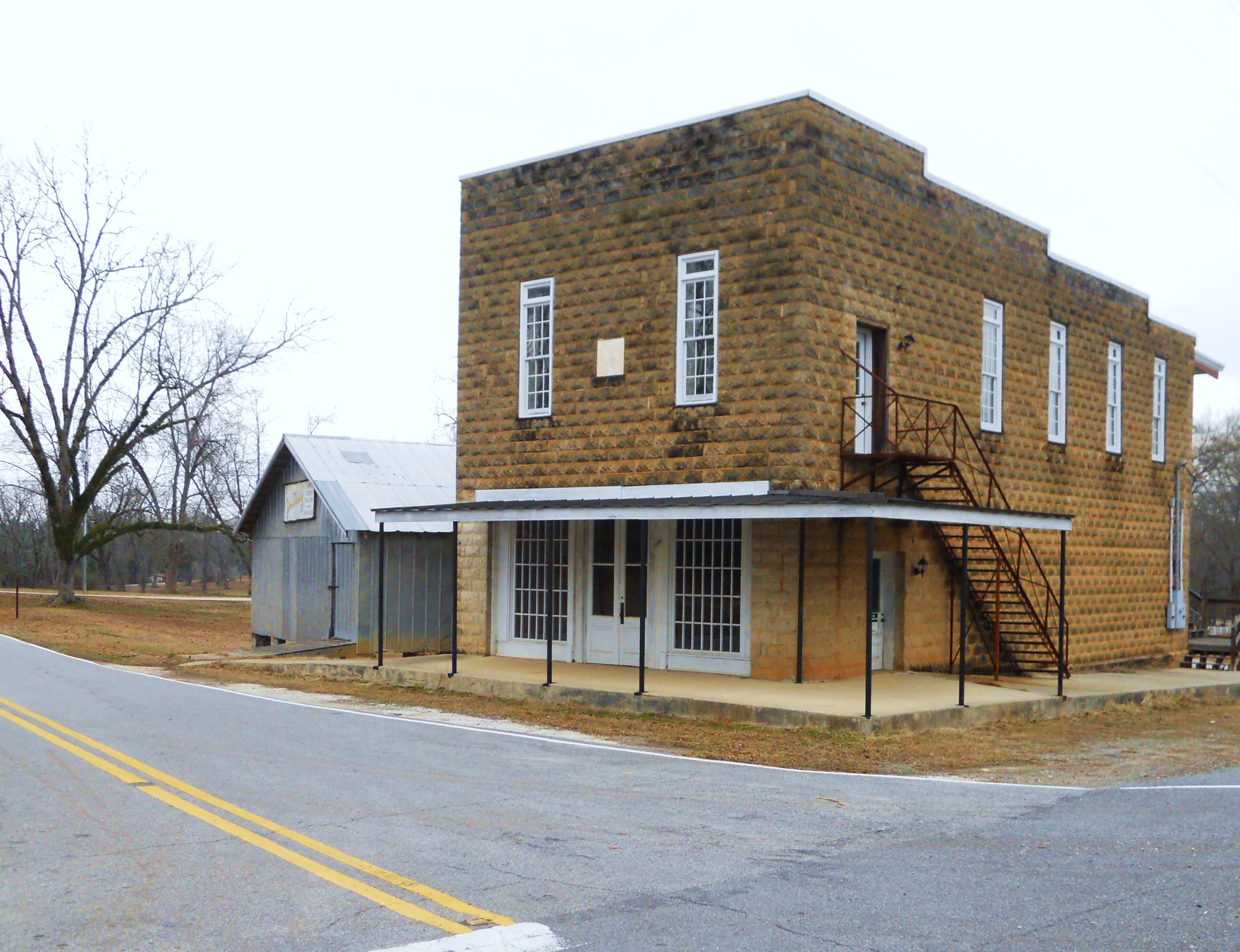
- Downtown Daviston

- Location of Daviston in Tallapoosa County, Alabama.
- Coordinates: 33°03′21″N 85°37′50″W
- Country: United States
- State: Alabama
- County: Tallapoosa
- Established: February 16, 1887

Area
  - Total: 9.17 sq mi (23.74 km^{2})
  - Land: 9.14 sq mi (23.66 km^{2})
  - Water: 0.031 sq mi (0.08 km^{2})
- Elevation: 725 ft (221 m)

Population (2020)
  - Total: 174
  - Density: 19.0/sq mi (7.35/km^{2})
- Time zone: UTC-6 (Central (CST))
  - Summer (DST): UTC-5 (CDT)
- ZIP code: 36256
- Area code: 256
- FIPS code: 01-19816
- GNIS feature ID: 2406360

Daviston is a town in Tallapoosa County, Alabama, United States. As of the 2020 census, Daviston had a population of 174.

== History ==
Daviston, incorporated February 16, 1887, is believed to be the first incorporated rural town in Tallapoosa County. The first mayor was J.D. Dunn. Daviston was a natural evolution of the opening of Indian lands in 1832. Much of the Federal Horse Path was within Creek Indian lands in 1832. With construction of Chapman Road from West Point, Georgia to Fort Williams, Alabama on the Coosa River, land areas opened up to white settlement.

Daviston flourished with improved roads and became a hub of migration. It had grist and saw mills, a blacksmith shop, buggy shop, coffin shop, general mercantile, public well, federal distillery, six saloons or inns, pharmacy, and doctors. The first land deed found was dated 1836 to S.W. Monk. The post office was established in 1853 with John Davis as the first postmaster. The story told over the years is that he used his own name for the town name. When he submitted the name to the government, due to poor penmanship or a mistake, "Davis Town" became Daviston and has since remained.

=== Daviston School ===
In 1883, Walker Allen and his twin, Walter, moved to Daviston. Walker Allen was elected principal of Daviston School. In 1884, a wooden two-story building was started on land given by J.T. Moncus to be called Daviston College. It became a high school around 1912. The building burned in 1923. Another building was built and burned before being used. A third building was constructed in 1923 and received accreditation that year. Lillie Thompson, who graduated in 1916, was the first graduate of Daviston High School.

The school closed in 1988. At the time of closing, it was the smallest school in Alabama with 120 K-12 students. Thirty-eight principals served from 1883–1988. For 105 years, Daviston School served as the center of the community. In 1998, a committee formed to initiate a Daviston School Reunion to be held annually in the center of the town on the second Saturday of November.

== Geography ==
According to the U.S. Census Bureau, the town has a total area of 9.2 square miles (24 km^{2}), of which 9.2 square miles (24 km^{2}) is land and 0.11% is water.

== Demographics ==
Historical population
Census	Pop.	Note	%±
1890	141		—
1910	127		—
1920	89		−29.9%
1930	144		61.8%
1940	124		−13.9%
1950	110		−11.3%
1960	129		17.3%
1970	247		91.5%
1980	334		35.2%
1990	261		−21.9%
2000	267		2.3%
2010	214		−19.9%
2020	174		−18.7%
U.S. Decennial Census; 2013 Estimate

As of the census of 2000, there were 267 people, 109 households, and 74 families residing in the town. The population density was 29.1 inhabitants per square mile (11.2/km^{2}). There were 117 housing units at an average density of 12.8 per square mile (4.9/km^{2}). The racial makeup of the town was 82.02% White and 17.98% Black or African American. 1.50% of the population were Hispanic or Latino of any race.

There were 109 households, out of which 34.9% had children under the age of 18 living with them, 52.3% were married couples living together, 14.7% had a female householder with no husband present, and 31.2% were non-families. 26.6% of all households were made up of individuals, and 11.9% had someone living alone who was 65 years of age or older. The average household size was 2.45 and the average family size was 3.01.

In the town, the population was spread out, with 24.7% under the age of 18, 6.7% from 18 to 24, 32.6% from 25 to 44, 23.6% from 45 to 64, and 12.4% who were 65 years of age or older. The median age was 39 years. For every 100 females, there were 103.8 males. For every 100 females age 18 and over, there were 87.9 males.

The median income for a household in the town was $31,250, and the median income for a family was $37,500. Males had a median income of $26,250 versus $16,875 for females. The per capita income for the town was $14,239. About 15.9% of families and 18.4% of the population were below the poverty line, including 15.7% of those under the age of eighteen and 20.0% of those 65 or over.

== Notable person ==
- Floyd Mann, Alabama Public Safety director from 1959 to 1963.
