= Chicago Freedom Movement =

Series of demonstrations in Chicago in 1965–1966

- Part of the Civil Rights Movement
- Date: 1965–1966 (2 years)
- Location: Chicago, Illinois
- Caused by: De facto racial segregation in education, housing and employment; SCLC's establishment of a campaign in the Northern United States
- Result: Freedom Sunday rally and Chicago City Hall march led by Martin Luther King Jr. in 1966; Chicago branch of Operation Breadbasket established in 1966; Summit Agreement produced on August 26, 1966; Unaffiliated march in Cicero, September 1966; Formation of the Leadership Council for Metropolitan Open Communities (LCMOC); Book Where Do We Go from Here: Chaos or Community? written by Martin Luther King Jr. in 1967; Catalyst for the enactment of Fair Housing Act of 1968

Parties
Coordinating Council of Community Organizations (CCCO); American Friends Service Committee (AFSC); Southern Christian Leadership Conference (SCLC)	Chicago City Hall; Chicago Board of Education; Chicago Housing Authority; Chicago Real Estate Board; Chicago Mortgage Bankers Association

Lead figures
CCCO member: Al Raby; AFSC members: Kale Williams; Bernard Lafayette; David Jehnsen; Bill Moyer; SCLC members: Martin Luther King Jr.; James Bevel; Jesse Jackson	Mayor of Chicago: Richard J. Daley; Superintendent of Chicago Public Schools: Benjamin Willis

MLK speech, against Chicago Slums
- Chicago, Civil rights leaders address crowd in soldier field

The Chicago Freedom Movement, also known as the Chicago open housing movement, was led by Martin Luther King Jr., James Bevel and Al Raby. It was supported by the Chicago-based Coordinating Council of Community Organizations (CCCO) and the Southern Christian Leadership Conference (SCLC).

The movement included a large rally, marches and demands to the City of Chicago. These demands covered a range of areas beside housing discrimination in the United States, including educational inequality, transportation and employment discrimination, income inequality, health inequality, wealth inequality, crime in Chicago, criminal justice reform in the United States, community development, tenants rights and quality of life. Operation Breadbasket, in part led by Jesse Jackson, sought to harness African-American consumer power.

The Chicago Freedom Movement was the most ambitious civil rights campaign in the Northern United States, lasted from mid-1965 to August 1966, and is largely credited with inspiring the 1968 Fair Housing Act.

== Background ==
During World War I, tens of thousands of African Americans moved to Chicago as part of the many destinations in the Great Migration to urban and industrial centers in the Northeast and Midwest in search of jobs, and to escape the Jim Crow laws and racial violence in the rural South. Large numbers of black migrants to the city resided in the South Side area near the established Irish and German American communities as well as neighborhoods of many recent immigrants from southern and eastern Europe. As a result, social and racial tensions in the city intensified, as native-born residents, migrants and immigrants fiercely competed for jobs and limited housing due to overcrowding. Tensions eventually simmered into the Chicago race riot of 1919 during the Red Summer era, in which ethnic Irish gangs attacked black neighborhoods on the South Side, leading to the deaths of 23 blacks and 15 whites as well as many arson damages to buildings.

In the 1920s, the Chicago Real Estate Board established a racially restrictive covenant policy in response to the rapid influx of southern black migrants who were allegedly feared in bringing down property values of white neighborhoods. Contractual agreements among property owners included prohibiting sale or lease of any part of a building to specific groups of people, usually African Americans. For the next few decades, blacks were prevented from purchasing homes in certain white neighborhoods in Chicago. Although highly skilled African Americans gained unprecedented access to city jobs, they were not given as many opportunities for work and were often left with less desirable positions, sometimes in dangerous or unpleasant settings. School boundary lines were carefully drawn to avoid integrating the Chicago Public Schools (CPS), and African American children attended all-black schools in overcrowded conditions, with less funding in materials. As a result, many black families were locked in the overcrowded South Side in shoddy conditions.

In 1910, the population of black residents were 40,000. By 1960, it grew to 813,000, fueled by the Second Great Migration of blacks into the city during World War II to work in the war industries and during the post-war economic expansion. The United States Supreme Court ruled in Shelley v. Kraemer in 1948 that racial covenant policies were unconstitutional, yet such practice continued without opposition over the next two decades. During the post-war economic boom, the Chicago Housing Authority (CHA) tried to ease the pressure in the overcrowded ghettos and put public housing sites in less congested areas in the city. The white residents did not take this very well and reacted with violence when black families tried to move into white areas, so city politicians forced the CHA to keep the status quo and develop high rise projects in black neighborhoods. Some of these became notorious failures. As industrial restructuring in the 1950s and later led to massive job losses to the suburbs amidst the white flight, black residents changed from working-class families to poor families on welfare.

=== Civil Rights Movement ===
In the 1950s and 1960s, the growing discontent among black Americans about their continuous mistreatment in the US culminated into the formation of the Civil Rights Movement. Nonviolent actions led by African-Americans nationwide, such as the court case Brown vs. Board of Education, the Montgomery bus boycott, the Little Rock Nine's enrollment in a segregated school, the Nashville sit-ins, the Birmingham campaign, the Freedom Summer voter registration drive and the Selma to Montgomery marches helped spur federal action that slowly broke down legalized racial segregation in the South.

While much of the attention was focused on the South, little had been paid to the conditions in the North and West. Civil rights activists attempted to expose and contest the inequities of life in Chicago. In 1962, then-University of Chicago student Bernie Sanders organized a 15-day sit-in with other protesters to challenge the university's alleged off-campus segregated residential properties. In October 1963, tens of thousands of students and residents boycotted the CPS due to the segregationist policies of Superintendent of Chicago Public Schools Benjamin Willis, who was notorious for placing mobile units on playgrounds and parking lots to solve overcrowding in black schools. While city authorities made a promise to investigate the conditions raised by civil rights activists, they never made a serious effort to take action. Protests, sit-ins and demonstrations in Chicago continued throughout 1964 and 1965.

On August 11, 1965, riots ignited in Watts, a predominantly black section of Los Angeles, after the arrest of a 21-year-old black man for drunk driving. The violence lasted five days and resulted in 34 deaths, 3,900 arrests and the destruction of over 744 buildings and 200 businesses in a 20-square-mile area. The riots shocked the nation and raised awareness of the struggles urban blacks faced outside the South. Martin Luther King Jr. told a New York paper that "The non-violent movement of the South has meant little to them, since we have been fighting for rights that theoretically are already theirs." The riots were one of the events that helped convince King and some other civil rights activists to join the ongoing Chicago Freedom Movement in combating the widespread de facto segregated conditions across the country.

== Actions ==
The Chicago Freedom Movement represented the alliance of the Southern Christian Leadership Conference (SCLC), the American Friends Service Committee (AFSC) and the Coordinating Council of Community Organizations (CCCO). The SCLC was looking for a site to prove that nonviolence and nonviolent direct action could bring about social change outside of the South. The CCCO had harnessed anger over racial inequality, especially in the public schools, in the city of Chicago to build the most sustained local civil rights movement in the North. The activism of the CCCO pulled SCLC to Chicago, as did the work of the AFSC's Kale Williams, Bernard Lafayette, David Jehnsen and others, owing to the decision by SCLC's Director of Direct Action, James Bevel, to come to Chicago to work with the AFSC project on the city's West Side. (The SCLC's second choice had been Washington DC.)

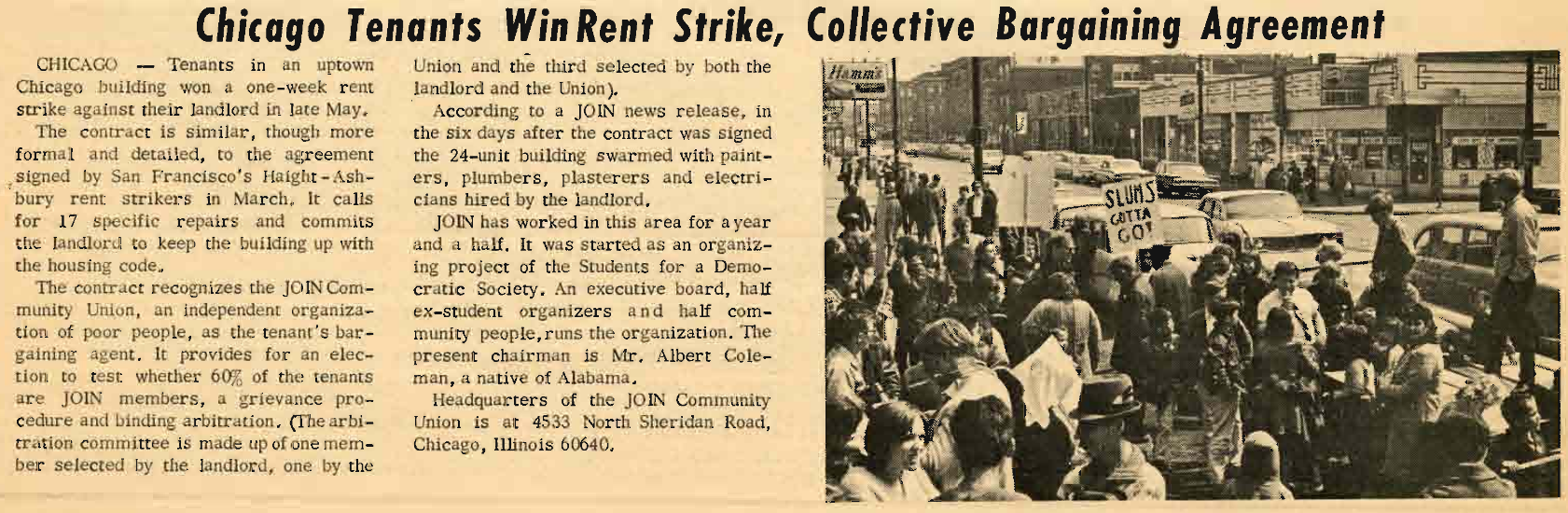
The Movement, July 1966 Vol 2. No. 6

The Chicago Freedom Movement declared its intention to end slums in the city. It organized tenants' unions, held rent strikes, assumed control of a slum tenement, founded action groups like Operation Breadbasket and rallied black and white Chicagoans to support its goals. In the early summer of 1966, it and Bevel focused their attention on housing discrimination, an issue Bevel attributed to the work and idea of AFSC activist Bill Moyer. A large rally was held by Martin Luther King at Soldier Field on July 10, 1966. According to a UPI news story that ran the next day, "About 35,000 persons jammed Chicago's Soldier Field for Dr. King's first giant 'freedom rally' since bringing his civil rights organizing tactics to the city..." Other guests included Mahalia Jackson, Stevie Wonder and Peter, Paul and Mary.

By late July the Chicago Freedom Movement was staging regular rallies outside of Real Estate offices and marches into all-white neighborhoods on the city's southwest and northwest sides. The hostile and sometimes violent response of local whites, and the determination of civil rights activists to continue to crusade for an open housing law, alarmed City Hall and attracted the attention of the national press. During one demonstration King said that even in Alabama and Mississippi he had not encountered mobs as hostile to Blacks' civil rights as those in Chicago.

In mid-August, high-level negotiations began between city leaders, movement activists and representatives of the Chicago Real Estate Board. On August 26, after the Chicago Freedom Movement had declared that it would march into Cicero, an agreement, consisting of positive steps to open up housing opportunities in metropolitan Chicago, was reached. The Summit Agreement was the culmination of months of organizing and direct action. It did not satisfy all activists, some of whom, in early September 1966, marched on Cicero over the objection of James Bevel, who had directed the movement for SCLC.

After the open-housing marches and Summit agreements, the overall Chicago Freedom Movement lost much of its focus and momentum. By early 1967, Martin Luther King, James Bevel and SCLC had trained their energies on other projects, mainly – for King and Bevel – the anti-Vietnam war movement.

== Demands ==
On July 10, 1966, King placed a list of demands on the door of the Chicago City Hall to gain leverage with city leaders.

Real estate boards and brokers

1. Public statements that all listings will be available on a nondiscriminatory basis.

Banks and savings institutions

1. Public statements of a nondiscriminatory mortgage policy so that loans will be available to any qualified borrower without regard to the racial composition of the area.

Mayor and city council

1. Publication of headcounts of whites, Negroes and Latin Americans for all city departments and for all firms from which city purchases are made.
2. Revocation of contracts with firms that do not have a full scale fair employment practice.
3. Creation of a citizens review board for grievances against police brutality and false arrests or stops and seizures.
4. Ordinance giving ready access to the names of owners and investors for all slum properties.
5. A saturation program of increased garbage collection, street cleaning and building inspection services in the slum properties.

Political parties

1. The requirement that precinct captains be residents of their precincts.

Chicago Housing Authority and the Chicago Dwelling Association

1. Program to rehabilitate present public housing including such items as locked lobbies, restrooms in recreation areas, increased police protection and child care centers on every third floor.
2. Program to increase vastly the supply of low-cost housing on a scattered basis for both low- and middle-income families.

Business

1. Basic headcounts, including white, Negro and Latin American, by job classification and income level, made public.
2. Racial steps to upgrade and to integrate all departments, all levels of employments.

== 1968 Fair Housing Act ==
The 1968 Fair Housing Act passed by Congress was a direct result of the 1966 Chicago open housing movement and King's assassination.

== See also ==
- History of education in Chicago
- White House Conference on Civil Rights
