= Bernard Lafayette =

American civil rights activist (1940–2026)

The Reverend Bernard Lafayette
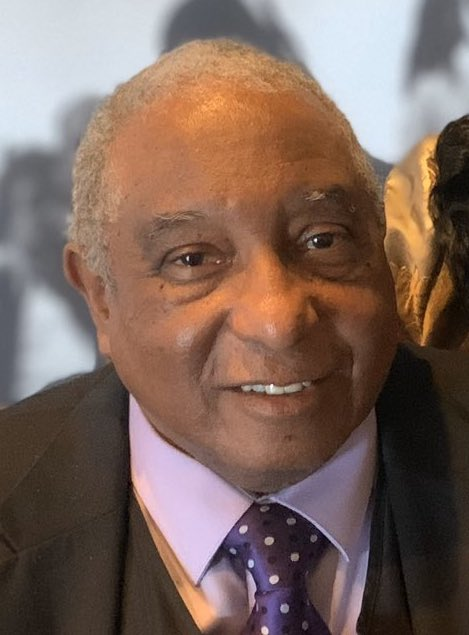
- Lafayette in 2020
- Born: July 29, 1940; Tampa, Florida, U.S.
- Died: March 5, 2026 (aged 85); Opelika, Alabama, U.S.
- Resting place: Greenwood Cemetery, Tuskegee, Alabama
- Education: Highlander Folk School
- Alma mater: American Baptist College; Harvard Graduate School of Education
- Known for: Activism in the civil rights movement

Bernard Lafayette (or LaFayette) Jr. (/læfiˈɛt/; July 29, 1940 – March 5, 2026) was an American civil rights activist, organizer and Baptist minister, who was a leader in the civil rights movement. He played a leading role in early organizing of the Selma Voting Rights Movement. He was also a member of the Nashville Student Movement and worked closely throughout the 1960s movements with groups such as the Student Nonviolent Coordinating Committee (SNCC), the Southern Christian Leadership Conference (SCLC), and the American Friends Service Committee.

== Background ==
Lafayette was born on July 29, 1940, in Tampa, Florida, where he was also raised. His parents were Willie Verdell (Forrester) and Bernard Lafayette Sr. Bernard was the eldest of eight children. His siblings were Harold, Joyce, Rozelia, Brenda, Geri, Michael, and Victoria. Lafayette spent much of his childhood in Tampa. His family grew up poor, so Bernard started working odd jobs to gain more income by the age of 11. His jobs included cashiering, meat cutting, delivering produce, and collecting change at a coffee shop. When reminiscing on his childhood, Bernard said: "I had to grow up rapidly. In other words, I didn't have a childhood."

Despite being Black in the south, Lafayette said he initially attended an integrated elementary school, and eventually began to go to schools that were still segregated. While he was at the integrated school he said that "even though it wasn't segregated, I could still see the contrast between the two worlds." Bernard had clear recollections of some of the racism that he experienced at a young age. When Bernard was seven years old, he was heading downtown with his grandmother, Ma Foster, so they decided to catch a streetcar. One of the segregation laws regarding streetcars was that Black people would pay at the front door, and then enter through the back door. When his grandmother paid the streetcar driver, the driver started driving before either of them could board, pocketing their money and leaving them stranded. Lafayette said that this was one of the first instances where he realized that he wanted to do something about how African Americans were being treated.

== Early adult life and career ==
As a young man at the age of 20, Lafayette moved to Nashville, Tennessee, and enrolled in the American Baptist Theological Seminary, where one of his roommates was the future civil rights activist and congressman John Lewis. During the course of his freshman year, Lafayette took classes in nonviolence at the Highlander Folk School run by Myles Horton, and attended many meetings promoting nonviolence. He learned more about the philosophy of nonviolence as lived by Mohandas Gandhi, while taking seminars from activist James Lawson, a well-known nonviolent representative of the Fellowship of Reconciliation.

Lafayette began to use the nonviolent techniques as he became more exposed to the strong racial injustice of the South. In 1959, he, along with his friends Diane Nash, James Bevel, and John Lewis, all members of the Nashville Student Movement, led sit-ins, such as the 1960 Lunch Counter Sit-In, at restaurants and businesses that practiced segregation. As an advocate of nonviolence, in 1960 Lafayette assisted in the formation of the Student Nonviolent Coordinating Committee (SNCC).

== Freedom Rides ==
In 1961, the Congress of Racial Equality (CORE) initiated a movement to enforce federal integration laws on interstate bus routes. This movement, known as the Freedom Rides, had African-American and white volunteers ride together on bus routes through the segregated South. Lafayette wanted to participate, but his parents forbade him. After the Freedom Riders were violently attacked in the city of Anniston, Alabama, the Nashville Student Movement, of which Lafayette was a member, vowed to take over the journey. At the time, some civil rights leaders worried that the Freedom Rides were too provocative and would damage the movement. Despite many doubts, these Nashville students were determined to finish the job. In May 1961, in the city of Montgomery, Alabama, Lafayette and the other riders were "greeted" at the bus terminal by an angry white mob, members of Ku Klux Klan chapters, and were viciously attacked. The Freedom Riders were brutally beaten. Their attackers carried every makeshift weapon imaginable: baseball bats, wooden boards, bricks, chains, tire irons, pipes, and even garden tools.

During the Montgomery attack, Lafayette stood firm; his fellow riders William Barbee and John Lewis were beaten until they fell unconscious. Lafayette, Fred Leonard and Allen Cason narrowly escaped being killed by jumping over a wall and running to the post office. Everyone inside was carrying on individual business, just like nothing was happening outside. Lafayette later stated, "I thought they were shooting Freedom Riders." It was the gunshot of Alabama's Director of Public Safety, Floyd Mann, who was fighting for the protection of the Freedom Riders.

Lafayette with other Riders was arrested in Jackson, Mississippi, and jailed at Parchman State Prison Farm during June 1961. During Lafayette's participation in civil rights activities, he was beaten and arrested 27 times.

== Selma ==
In the summer of 1962, Lafayette accepted a position with the Student Nonviolent Coordinating Committee (SNCC) to conduct organizing work in Selma, Alabama, alongside his then wife Colia Liddell Lafayette. He would also serve as director of SNCC's Alabama Voter Registration Campaign. Upon arriving in the city in February 1963, he began leading meetings in which he spoke about the condition of African Americans in the South and encouraged local African Americans to share their experiences. Lafayette would in fact be the first non-local organizer of the later 1965 Selma-to-Montgomery campaign to enter Selma, and is regarding having set the stage for the 1965 voting rights campaign as well. He met the representatives of the Dallas County Voters League who impressed him. While in Selma, Lafayette would spend months organizing and training local residents in nonviolent protest and civic engagement. On the night of June 12, 1963 (the same night that Medgar Evers was murdered in Mississippi), Lafayette was severely beaten by a white assailant, but was rescued by an armed neighbor who confronted the attacker. While badly injured, he was not deterred from continuing his work. In late 1964, the board of Southern Christian Leadership Conference (SCLC) decided to join the ongoing Alabama Project organized by James Bevel, Diane Nash, and James Orange, and chose Selma as the focal point to gain voting rights for African Americans. In early 1965, Lafayette, Bevel, Martin Luther King Jr., Orange, Nash and others organized a series of public demonstrations that finally, with the march from Selma-to-Montgomery initiated by Bevel, put enough pressure on the federal government to take action and gave enough support to President Lyndon Johnson for Johnson to go public with his demand of the drafting and passage of the Voting Rights Act of 1965.

== Life after Selma ==
Lafayette went on to work on the 1966 Chicago Open Housing Movement (he had worked in Chicago earlier with Kale Williams, Bill Moyer, David Jehnsen and other leaders of the American Friends Service Committee). He later became ordained as a Baptist minister and served as president of the American Baptist Theological Seminary. Lafayette subsequently returned to school, earning a Master of Education degree at the Harvard Graduate School of Education in 1972, followed by a Doctor of Education from Harvard two years later.

He was recognized as a major authority on strategies for nonviolent social change and nonviolent direct action in the world. In 1973, Lafayette was named first director of the Peace Education Program at Gustavus Adolphus College, Saint Peter, Minnesota. The Gustavus program enabled Lafayette to infuse the entire curriculum of the college with peace education. Lafayette served this Lutheran liberal arts college for nearly three years. He was also the dean of the graduate school at Alabama State University. He was a Senior Fellow at the University of Rhode Island, where he helped to found the Center for Nonviolence and Peace Studies, promoting nonviolence education using a curriculum based on the principles and methods of Martin Luther King Jr. He was a Distinguished Scholar-in-Residence at the Candler School of Theology, at Emory University in Atlanta, Georgia. He served as scholar-in-residence at the Caroline Marshall Draughon Center for the Arts & Humanities in the College of Liberal Arts at Auburn University.

Lafayette was honored as a Doctor of Humane Letters from Mount Holyoke College, in May 2012. In 2014, The University of Rhode Island honored Lafayette with an honorary doctorate in recognition of his lifetime nonviolence leadership for civil and human rights. In 2015, he received an honorary degree and was the principal speaker at the 2015 graduation of St. Michael's College in Colchester, Vermont. In 2019 he was awarded the Coretta Scott King Legacy Award by Antioch College's Coretta Scott King Center for Cultural and Intellectual Freedom.

Together with David Jehnsen, Lafayette authored the Kingian Nonviolence Conflict Reconciliation.

Following Selma, Lafayette went on to write several books about his experiences in the civil rights movement and books covering his views and thoughts on nonviolence. These books include The Leaders Manual: A Structured Guide and Introduction to Kingian Nonviolence, The Briefing Booklet: An Orientation to the Kingian Nonviolence Conflict Reconciliation Program, and In Peace and Freedom: My Journey in Selma. His oral history is included in the 2006 book Generation on Fire: Voices of Protest from the 1960s by Jeff Kisseloff.

In 2019, Lafayette was honored with the Coretta Scott King legacy award. On March 8, 2026, Lafayette posthumously received the Martin & Coretta King International Lifetime Peace & Justice Award at the 2026 Martin & Coretta King Unity Breakfast in Selma, Alabama.

== Personal life and death ==
Lafayette married Kate Bulls Lafayette in 1969. He raised two children with his previous wife Colia Liddell Lafayette: Bernard Lafayette III and James Lafayette Sr. According to his children, Lafayette was a loving father, who never yelled at, was stern with, or even expressed anger towards his wife or his kids. The family had a very tight-knit relationship, and spent tons of time together. James became an ordained preacher (influenced by his father, who was a religious man), and Lafayette III attended American Baptist College.

Lafayette died at his home in Opelika, Alabama, of a heart attack on March 5, 2026, at the age of 85. His visitation was held at People's Funeral Home in Tuskegee on March 21, 2026. His funeral service was held on March 22, 2026, at The Tuskegee University Chapel, with Ambassador and former Martin Luther King Jr. advisor Andrew Young, surviving Martin Luther King Jr. children Martin Luther King III and Bernice King and Executive Director of the Equal Justice Initiative in Montgomery Bryan Stevenson being among those who spoke, followed by a burial at Greenwood Cemetery in Tuskegee.

== Books ==
- Bernard LaFayette Jr. and Kathryn Lee Johnson. In Peace and Freedom: My Journey in Selma. Lexington, Kentucky: University Press of Kentucky, 2016.

== See also ==
- List of civil rights leaders
- List of peace activists
