= Floyd Mann =

American soldier and police officer

Floyd Mann (August 20, 1920 - January 12, 1996) was an American law enforcement official, who served as Director of the Alabama Department of Public Safety between 1959 and 1963. He is best known for his interactions with the Freedom Riders who passed through Alabama in May 1961.

== Early life ==
Mann was born in Daviston, Tallapoosa County, Alabama, in 1920. After schooling in Davidson and Alexander City, Alabama, Mann joined the United States Army Air Corps, serving as a tail gunner on a B-17, where he flew 27 combat missions including the first daylight raid on Berlin. He received numerous awards including the Distinguished Flying Cross. He married Grace Doss of Fort Worth, Texas, on November 25, 1944.

== Career in law enforcement ==
After his military service he served as a security officer at Republic Steel in Gadsden. Afterwards he served as a police officer in Alexander City, where he rose to the rank of lieutenant.

From 1950 until 1958, he served as the chief of police of Opelika, where he assisted with the clean-up of gambling and corruption that had spilled over from Phenix City. During this time he developed a close relationship with John Patterson, who later became attorney general and governor. From 1959 until 1963, he served as director of the Alabama Department of Public Safety, appointed by Governor Patterson.

=== Freedom Riders incident ===
External videos
- “Interview with Floyd Mann” conducted in 1985 for the Eyes on the Prize documentary in which he discusses the Freedom Rides in Alabama.

Mann was the Director of Public Safety for Alabama in 1961, when the nonviolent Freedom Riders entered the state seeking an end to segregation. As governor Patterson was resisting U.S. Attorney General Robert F. Kennedy's demands that the Freedom Riders be protected from the Ku Klux Klan and others who were attacking them at their Alabama stops. Patterson was a committed segregationist who called the Freedom Riders "fools" and "agitators" for whom he did not want to "play nursemaid".

Mann offered to protect the riders if he was given the proper resources, with the understanding that the state and city police of Alabama would offer assistance. Kennedy sent a representative to talk to Patterson, who had his entire cabinet attend the meeting. Patterson based his repeated refusal to protect the nonviolent demonstrators from the Klan on his argument that such protection was impossible to provide, and well beyond the capabilities of local or state law enforcement.

Violence in Alabama was organized by Birmingham Police Sergeant Tom Cook (an avid Ku Klux Klan supporter) and police commissioner Bull Connor. The pair made plans to bring the Ride to an end in Alabama. When the bus arrived in Birmingham, it was attacked by a mob of Ku Klux Klan members, assisted by the police under the orders of Commissioner Connor. As the riders exited the bus, the mob beat them with baseball bats, iron pipes and bicycle chains. Among the Klansmen attacking the riders was FBI informant Gary Thomas Rowe. White Freedom Riders were particularly singled out for beating; James Peck required more than 50 stitches to the wounds in his head. Peck was taken to Carraway Methodist Medical Center, which refused to treat him; he was later treated at Jefferson Hillman Hospital.

Connor claimed that he had posted no officers at the bus depot because of the holiday; however, it was later discovered that the FBI knew of the planned attack and that the city police stayed away on purpose. Patterson did not apologize, commenting, "When you go somewhere looking for trouble, you usually find it...You just can't guarantee the safety of a fool and that's what these folks are, just fools." When asked about Connor, Mann said: "He was in charge, Bull Connor was in charge of the police department in Birmingham at that point in time. He was police commissioner... his comment was that it was just absolutely ridiculous for those people to be in Alabama doing what they were doing".

L. B. Sullivan, an elected city commissioner whose roles included supervision of the city police, had taken responsibility for the Freedom Riders' safety on the last leg of their escorted trip. Mann had been suspicious of Sullivan's assurances, but he had no authority within the city limits. He stationed highway patrolmen a few blocks away. When Mann arrived on the loading dock a few minutes into the riot, he was forced to act alone amid the chaos. A young black man, William Barbee, was knocked to the pavement, then struck repeatedly with a heavy club, with the mob shouting, "Kill him! Kill him!". Mann intervened by drawing his pistol and ordering the attackers back, threatening to shoot if they did not. Firing warning shots, he intervened on behalf of the Freedom Riders being beaten on the loading platform, and managed to ward off some of the attackers. Mann also saved the life of James Zwerg, who had been beaten badly by the rioters. Two Freedom Riders and a reporter carried Zwerg, who appeared to be dying, to a taxicab. The white driver refused to drive Zwerg to the hospital. A deputy sheriff arrived to read the injunction to Zwerg and the two other Freedom Riders. An African-American taxi driver agreed to take them to a doctor, but the police would not allow Zwerg to go, insisting that he would have to wait until a white ambulance arrived, which was impossible, as Sullivan had arranged for all the white ambulances to be in the repair shop on that day. Mann ordered one of his patrolmen to drive Zwerg to a hospital. He was hospitalized, but survived his injuries.

Sullivan's police arrived 10 minutes into the riot, but initially took no action to halt the beatings. Hearing that Mann was on the loading platform, Sullivan rushed to the scene and tried to assert his authority over Mann, before Judge Walter B. Jones and State Attorney General MacDonald Gallion arrived to take charge. Their primary concern was not to stop the riot or arrest Klansmen, but to read Judge Jones' injunction to the nearly unconscious Freedom Riders. At that point, Mann called for his state troopers whom he had stationed several blocks away, and they restored order at the terminal.

== Later life ==
After the end of Patterson's administration in 1963, Mann was interviewed for the position of police chief of Trenton, New Jersey, and Kansas City, Missouri. He chose to return to a company near his home, where he was employed by West Point Pepperell in Lanett, Alabama, as director of security. He was later employed by the University of Alabama as special assistant for security.

When University of Alabama president F. David Mathews was appointed as Secretary of Health, Education and Welfare, Mann went to Washington as his assistant. At the end of the Ford administration, he returned to the University of Alabama as vice president of external affairs. Mann retired from the university in 1982 and returned to state service, spending one and a half years in the Fob James administration as chief administrator of the Alcoholic Beverage Control Board.

Among his awards and honors, Mann was named United Press International's man of the year in Alabama for 1961. Mann established the Alabama Highway Patrol cadet program in 1959, which trained recruits aged 18 to 22 for a future career as an Alabama highway patrol officer. In 1947, he attended the FBI's National Academy, a six-month intensive police training program in Virginia, and later served as the president of the Alabama chapter of the FBI National Academy Graduates. In 1988, Mann was one of the first inductees in the Alabama Peace Officers Hall of Fame. At the induction ceremony, his superiors remarked “Floyd Mann knew what was going on.” At the time of his death, he was the executive director of the state Fraternal Order of Police, where he had served since 1988.
