= James Zwerg =

American civil rights activist (born 1939)

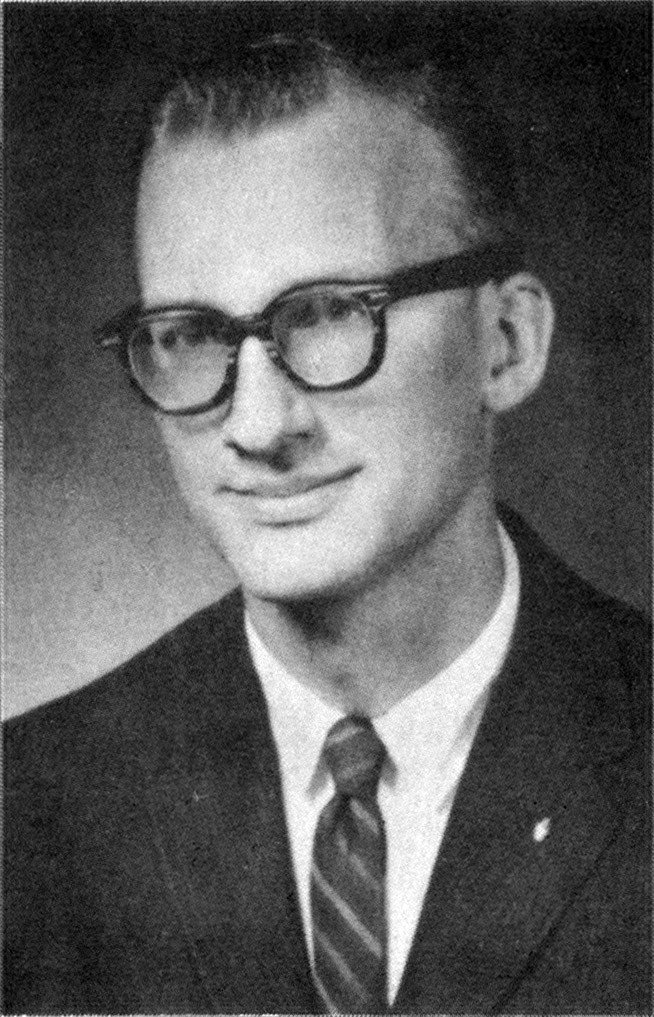
- Zwerg c. 1961
- Born: November 28, 1939 (age 86); Appleton, Wisconsin, U.S.
- Education: Beloit College
- Occupation: Minister
- Known for: Civil rights activist, Freedom Rider
- Spouse: Carrie (m. 1965)
- Children: 3

James Zwerg (born November 28, 1939) is an American retired minister who was involved with the Freedom Riders in the early 1960s.

== Early life ==
Zwerg was born in Appleton, Wisconsin where he lived with his parents and older brother, Charles. His father was a dentist who once a month provided free dental care to the poor. Zwerg was very involved in school and took part in the student protests in high school.

Zwerg was also very active in the Christian church, where he attended services regularly. Through the church, he became exposed to the belief in civil equality. He was taught that all people are created equal, no matter what race or religion they are.

== College and SNCC ==
Zwerg attended Beloit College, where he studied sociology and graduated in 1962. He developed an interest in civil rights from his interactions with his roommate, Robert Carter, an African-American from Georgia. Zwerg recalled: "I witnessed prejudice against him... we would go to a lunch counter or cafeteria and people would get up and leave the table. I had pledged a particular fraternity and then found out that he was not allowed in the fraternity house. I decided that his friendship was more important than that particular fraternity, so I depledged."

Zwerg participated in a one-semester student exchange program in January 1961 at Nashville's Fisk University, a predominantly black school. At Fisk, Zwerg met John Lewis, who was active in the Civil Rights Movement, and was immediately impressed with the way Lewis handled himself and his commitment to the movement. Lewis was a member of the Student Nonviolent Coordinating Committee (SNCC), a student organized Civil Rights activist group focused on nonviolent direct action. Zwerg joined SNCC and suggested that the group attend a movie. SNCC members explained to Zwerg that Nashville theaters were segregated. Zwerg began attending SNCC nonviolence workshops, often playing the angry bigot in role-play. His first test was to buy two movie tickets and try to walk in with a black man. When trying to enter the theater on February 21, 1961, Zwerg was hit with a monkey wrench and knocked unconscious.

== Freedom Rides ==
In 1961, the Congress of Racial Equality (CORE) began to organize Freedom Rides. The first departed from Washington, D.C. and involved 13 black and white riders who rode into the South challenging white only lunch counters and restaurants. When they reached Anniston, Alabama one of the buses was ambushed and attacked. Meanwhile, at an SNCC meeting in Tennessee, Lewis, Zwerg and 11 other volunteers decided to be reinforcements. Zwerg was the only white male in the group. Although scared for his life, Zwerg never had second thoughts. He recalled, "My faith was never so strong as during that time. I knew I was doing what I should be doing." The group traveled by bus to Birmingham, where Zwerg was first arrested for not moving to the back of the bus with his black seating companion, Paul Brooks.

Three days later, the riders regrouped and headed to Montgomery. At first the bus station there was an eerie quiet, but the scene turned into an ambush, with the riders attacked from all directions. "Mr. Zwerg was hit with his own suitcase in the face. Then he was knocked down and a group pummeled him" (qtd. in Loory 577). The prostrate activist was beaten into unconsciousness somewhere around the time a man took Zwerg's head between his knees while others took turns pounding and clawing at his face. At one point while Zwerg was unconscious, three men held him up while a woman kicked him in the groin. After it seemed that the worst of the onslaught was over, Zwerg gained semi-consciousness and tried to use the handrails to the loading platform to pull himself to his feet. As he struggled to get upright, a white man came and threw Zwerg over the rail. He crashed to the ground below, landing on his head. He was only the first to be beaten that day, but the attack on him may have been the most ruthless (Loory 573–79). Zwerg recalls, "There was nothing particularly heroic in what I did. If you want to talk about heroism, consider the black man who probably saved my life. This man in coveralls, just off of work, happened to walk by as my beating was going on and said 'Stop beating that kid. If you want to beat someone, beat me.' And they did. He was still unconscious when I left the hospital. I don't know if he lived or died."

Zwerg was denied prompt medical attention because there were no white ambulances available. He was quoted as saying "I suppose a person has to be dead before anyone will call an ambulance in Montgomery," as he lay in the hospital bed after being brutally beaten. He remained unconscious for two days and stayed in the hospital for five days. His post-riot photos were published in many newspapers and magazines across the country. After his beating, Zwerg claimed he had had an incredible religious experience and God helped him to not fight back. In a 2013 interview recalling the incident, he said, "In that instant, I had the most incredible religious experience of my life. I felt a presence with me. A peace. Calmness. It was just like I was surrounded by kindness, love. I knew in that instance that whether I lived or died, I would be OK." In a famous moving speech from his hospital room, Zwerg stated, "Segregation must be stopped. It must be broken down. Those of us on the Freedom Ride will continue.... We're dedicated to this, we'll take hitting, we'll take beating. We're willing to accept death. But we're going to keep coming until we can ride from anywhere in the South to any place else in the South without anybody making any comments, just as American citizens."

== Post-Freedom Rides ==
Later in 1961, Martin Luther King presented Zwerg with the Southern Christian Leadership Conference Freedom Award. After a conversation with King, Zwerg decided to enroll at Garrett Theological Seminary. He met his future wife Carrie. Zwerg was ordained a minister, serving for five years in three rural Wisconsin communities. The Zwergs settled in Tucson, Arizona in 1970 and had three children. He changed his career several times, including charity organization work and a stint in community relations at IBM. Zwerg retired in 1993 after which the couple built a cabin in rural New Mexico about 50 miles (80 km) from the nearest grocery store. Zwerg continues to spread awareness to this day about the trials and tribulations of the Freedom Rides and how love is what is most important. He gave a speech on May 18, 2011, at Troy University Rosa Parks Museum. He spoke about the effect the Freedom Rides had on his life. In an interview with Lisa Simeone, Zwerg talked about how blessed he was to have been a part of the Movement. "Everywhere we've stopped people have been so gracious and so kind and one of the things that has certainly been rewarding to me has been to see how many people brought their children; seeing a little eight-year-old boy come up to me and talk to me and say, 'May I please have your autograph? Thank you for what you did.' That was pretty special. I appreciated that."
