= Woodbury Soap Company =

1870-1901 company

- Company type: Private
- Industry: Manufacturing
- Founded: 1870 in Albany, NY
- Founder: John H. Woodbury
- Headquarters: Albany, NY
- Products: Personal Care Products

The Woodbury Soap Company was an American manufacturer of personal care products, such as cold cream, facial cream, facial powder, after-shave talc and ear swabs. Founded in Albany, New York, in 1870, it became a subsidiary of the Andrew Jergens Company in 1901. Woodbury soap continued as a brand into the 1950s, and was sponsor to popular radio programs in the 1930s and 1940s.

== History ==
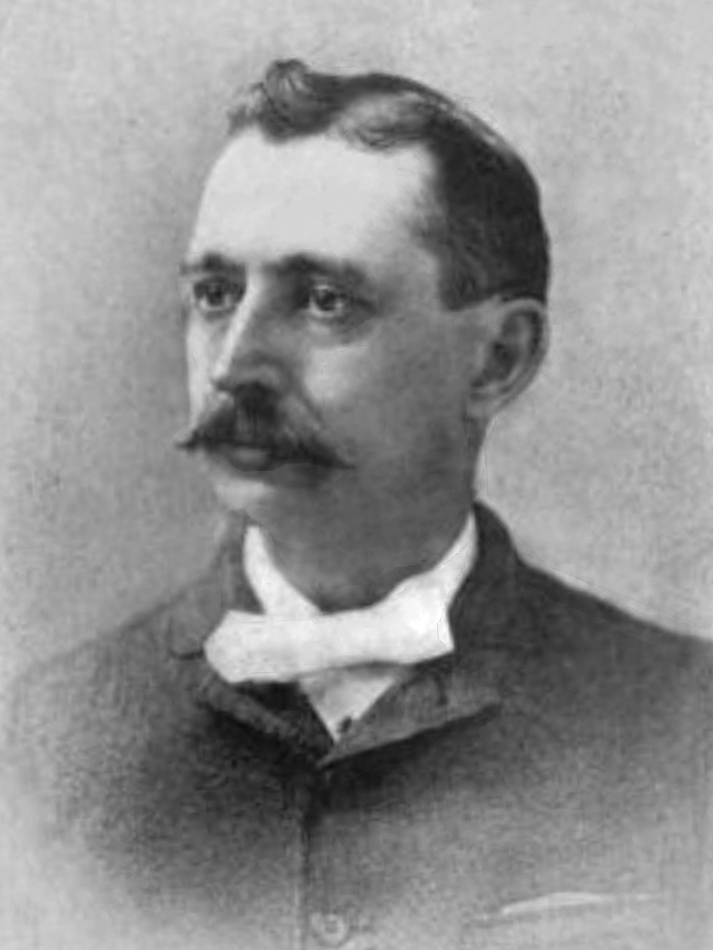
John H. Woodbury in 1902

The John H. Woodbury company was established in 1870 in Albany, New York, by a dermatologist. The company was still in New York in 1901, making and retailing soap, when the Andrew Jergens Company (now a subsidiary of Kao) purchased the company which owned the soap brand, and moved the headquarters to Cincinnati, Ohio.

Between 1907 and 1910, the Andrew Jergens Co., John H. Woodbury and the John H. Woodbury Dermatological Institute were involved in lawsuits against one another for use of the name "Woodbury". In 1908 the John H. Woodbury Dermatological Institute was brought to court for practicing medicine without a license, and in 1911 they filed for bankruptcy protection. The litigation in the 1908 lawsuit, established precedent involving the state's right to prevent "corporations from practicing medicine." The defeated argument being that they did not need a license, as they were a corporation, not an individual.

The Institute was recapitalized and was purchased by Benjamin H. Freedman.

== Ads and sponsorships ==
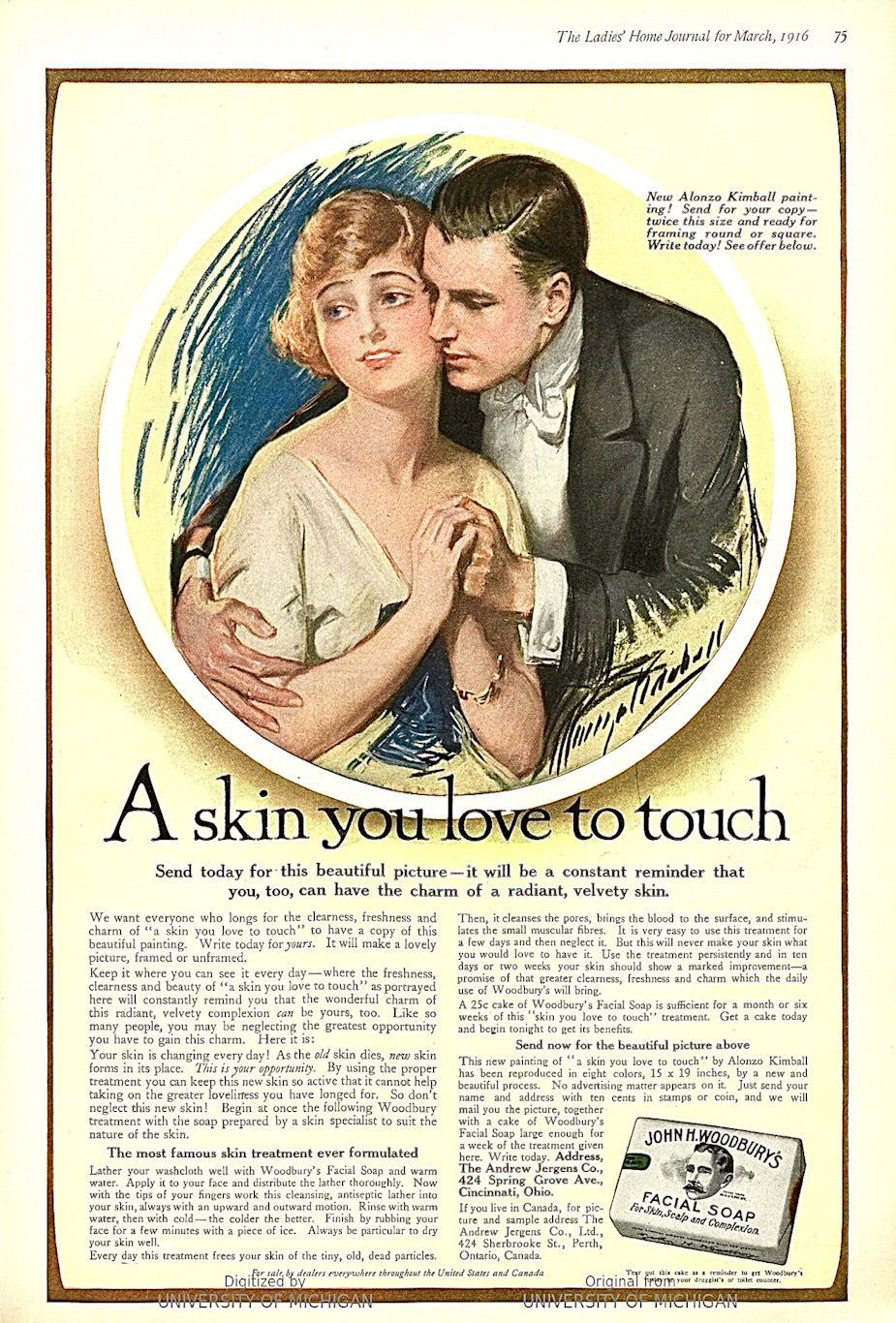
Woodbury advertisement featuring painting by Alonzo Myron Kimball, 1916

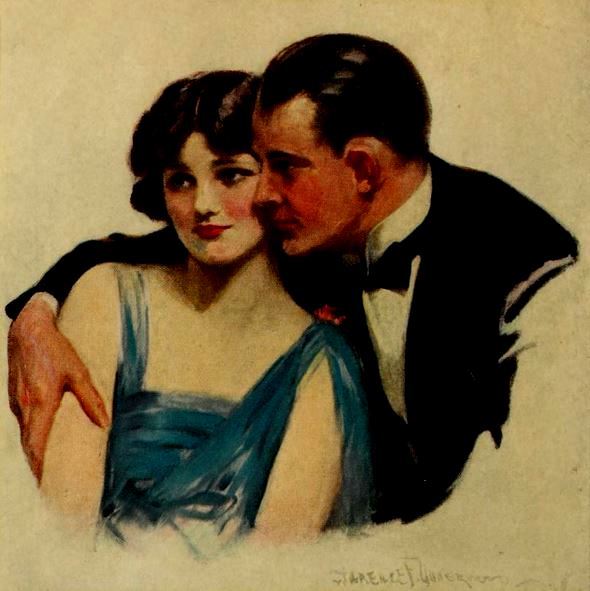
Detail of artwork by Clarence F. Underwood in another Woodbury ad on back cover of Photoplay, 1922

In 1911, the company became the first to use sex appeal to sell a product. Their ad slogan, created by the J. Walter Thompson Agency, claimed that women who used the soap would have "A Skin You Love To Touch". The slogan became so popular that Woodbury used it until the 1940s.

In 1936, Woodbury was one of the first companies to use nudity in its advertisements. The ad, known as "The Sun Bath", was photographed by Edward Steichen and showed a nude woman lying on stairs on her side with her back to the camera. The text advertised that Woodbury Soap was now enriched with "filter sunshine". Several celebrities also appeared in advertisements for Woodbury Soap. In 1938, debutante Brenda Frazier appeared in and for the company's soap which included a testimonial from the gossip columnist who was largely responsible for her fame, Cholly Knickerbocker). Future actress Oona O'Neill, who was then known as "New York's No. 1 "Deb", appeared in ads for the company's soap in 1943. In the 1940s and 1950s, actresses Lucille Ball, Virginia Bruce, Leslie Caron, Linda Darnell, Gloria DeHaven, Ava Gardner, Judy Garland, Veronica Lake, Myrna Loy, Marie McDonald, Merle Oberon, Donna Reed, Elizabeth Taylor (who also appeared in ads for the company's soap) Gene Tierney, and Esther Williams also appeared in ads for the company's cosmetics line.

The company also sponsored several radio shows. From 1933 to 1935, it was the sponsor of Bing Crosby's radio program Bing Crosby Entertains. In mid-1937, the company signed on to sponsor Bob Hope's radio show for 26 weeks. In 1936, they were a sponsor of the radio program Paul Whiteman's Musical Varieties on WJZ in New York City. From 1941 to 1942, the company sponsored The Adventures of the Thin Man, the 1940s radio show about husband-and-wife crime solvers that played the detective genre for laughs.

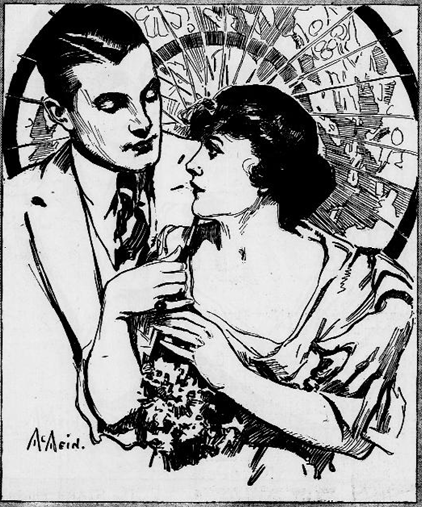
This picture was part of an advertising campaign by the Andrew Jergens Company in 1917. It was given out for every purchase of a cake of Woodbury's Facial Soap. Valid in the United States and Canada through 5 October 1917
