= NEOM Wellbeing =

British wellness and natural beauty company

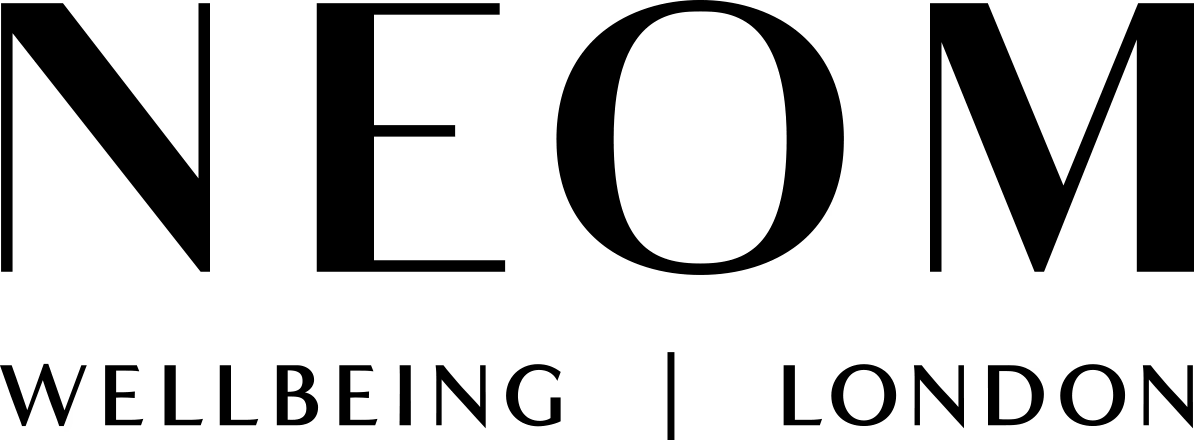
- Company type: Private
- Industry: Retail
- Founded: 2005; 21 years ago
- Founders: Nicola Elliott; Oliver Mennell
- Key people: Isabel Malbois (CEO)
- Website: neomwellbeing.com

NEOM Wellbeing is a British wellness and natural beauty company based in Harrogate. It was founded in 2005 by Nicola Elliott and Oliver Mennell.

== History ==
NEOM Wellbeing was founded as NEOM Organics in 2005 by family friends Nicola Elliott, a journalist who worked for Glamour magazine, and Oliver Mennell, a private equity analyst. Elliott's interest in wellness and natural products led her to train in aromatherapy alongside her media career. She later shifted her focus entirely to the wellness sector and formed a partnership with Mennell, who was working as a private equity analyst at the time. The name "NEOM" is derived from a combination of the founders' initials. Since its founding, it has received B Corp certification.

In 2011, NEOM received investment from Michael Warshaw, the former owner of Molton Brown.

In 2015, NEOM opened its first high street retail store in Wimbledon Village. A year later, in 2016, NEOM opened its second retail store in Leeds.

In 2017, Piper, a private equity investment firm, invested in NEOM. Two years later, in 2019, NEOM opened a store on Guildford High Street. In October 2020, NEOM opened its fifth Wellbeing Hub in a new retail space adjacent to Liverpool Street Station in London.

In 2021, NEOM expanded its operations to the United States, and its products became available through retailers such as Nordstrom, Amazon Prestige Beauty, and Anthropologie. Later, it opened a fulfillment centre in Martinsville, Virginia. In 2022, it was included in the Sunday Times 100 list. In 2023, NEOM launched a separate website for the United States.

In July 2024, NEOM opened a 481-square-foot Wellbeing Hub in New York City's West Village.

== Locations ==
NEOM Wellbeing is headquartered in Harrogate. It operates six NEOM Wellbeing Hubs located in London (Wimbledon and Liverpool Street), Guildford, Leeds, and Kildare Village, and maintains wholesale distribution through counters in department stores, including John Lewis & Partners and Selfridges.
