= John E. Rankin =

U.S. Representative from Mississippi (1921–1953)

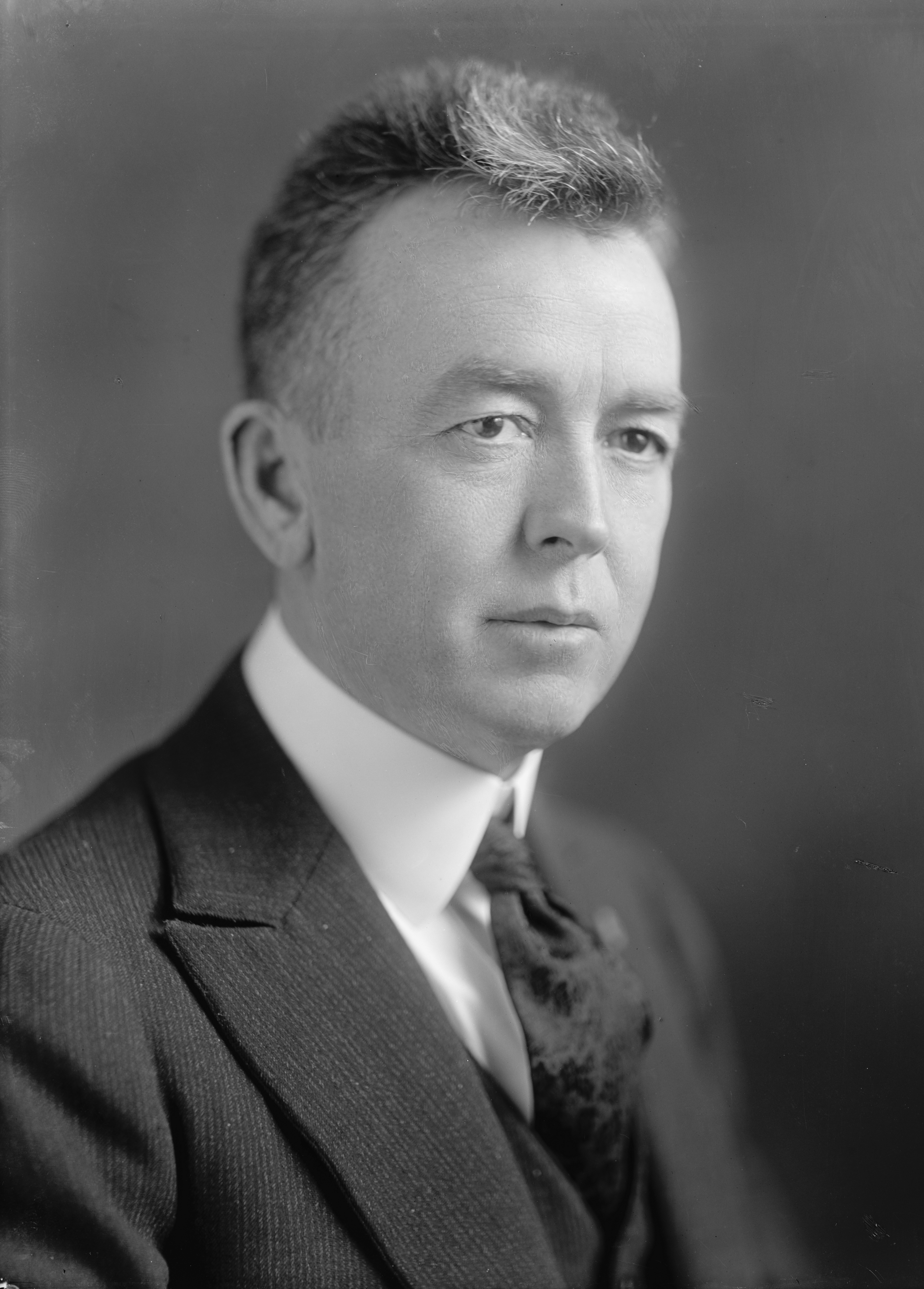

Chairman of the House Veterans' Affairs Committee
- In office January 3, 1949 – January 3, 1953
- Speaker: Sam Rayburn
- Preceded by: Edith Nourse Rogers
- Succeeded by: Edith Nourse Rogers

Member of the U.S. House of Representatives from Mississippi's 1st district
- In office March 4, 1921 – January 3, 1953
- Preceded by: Ezekiel Candler
- Succeeded by: Thomas Abernethy

Personal details
- Born: John Elliott Rankin; March 29, 1882 Itawamba County, Mississippi, U.S.
- Died: November 26, 1960 (aged 78) Tupelo, Mississippi, U.S.
- Party: Democratic

John Elliott Rankin (March 29, 1882 – November 26, 1960) was a Democratic politician from Mississippi who served sixteen terms in the U.S. House of Representatives from 1921 to 1953. He was co-author of the bill for the Tennessee Valley Authority and from 1933 to 1936 he supported the New Deal programs of President Franklin D. Roosevelt, which brought investment and jobs to the South.

Rankin proposed a bill to prohibit interracial marriage and opposed a bill to prohibit state use of the poll tax, which southern states had used since the turn of the century to disenfranchise most blacks and many poor whites. He used his power to support segregation and deny federal benefits programs to African Americans. For instance, in 1944, following the Port Chicago disaster, the U.S. Navy asked Congress to authorize payments of $5,000 to each of the victims' families. But when Rankin learned most of the dead were black sailors, he insisted the amount be reduced to $2,000; Congress settled the amount at $3,000 per family.

He was the main House sponsor of the G.I. Bill. Rankin insisted that its administration be decentralized, which led to continued discrimination against black veterans in the South and their virtual exclusion from one of the most important postwar programs to build social capital among United States residents. In the South, black veterans were excluded from loans, training and employment assistance. The historically black colleges were underfunded and could accept only about half the men who wanted to enroll.

On the floor of the House, Rankin expressed racist views of African Americans, Japanese Americans, and Jews, accusing Albert Einstein of being a communist agitator. During World War II, Rankin supported a bill that would incarcerate all Japanese Americans in the US and its territories in what he called "concentration camps". He later helped to establish the House Un-American Activities Committee which questioned the Hollywood Ten screenwriters during the McCarthy Era. He described an anti-lynching bill as "a bill to encourage Negroes to think they can rape our white women!" while shaking his fist at a gallery of mostly colored persons.

== Early life ==
Rankin was born on March 29, 1882, near Bolands in Itawamba County, Mississippi to a family that had planter ancestors with large holdings before the Civil War. His parents were Thomas Braxton Rankin, a schoolteacher and resident of Tupelo, and Venola Modeste (née Rutledge), born in Arkansas as the daughter of Robert Rutledge and Ellen (née Conoway) Rutledge. His paternal ancestors had come to Mississippi from South Carolina in 1840.

After attending local schools and a normal school, Rankin attended college, graduating from the University of Mississippi law school in 1910. He was admitted to the bar the same year and established a practice in Clay County, near where he grew up. From 1911 to 1915, he served as the prosecuting attorney of Lee County.

He married Annie Laurie Burrous; the couple had a daughter, Annie Laurie Rankin.

He became prosecuting attorney of Lee County in 1912, a position he held until 1915.

=== Military service ===
Rankin served in the United States Army, enlisting just before the end of World War I. In all, he spent 21 days at the Army's officers’ training camp. He would use his brief stint in the military to his political advantage, frequently portraying himself as a former war soldier who supported his fellow veterans.

== Political career ==
Rankin twice ran unsuccessfully for Congress, in 1916 and 1918. He then started a newspaper called The New Era, which published anti-immigrant rhetoric and openly defended segregation and lynching.

=== Election to Congress ===
Since passage of a new constitution in 1890 that effectively disenfranchised African Americans, Mississippi had become a one-party state dominated by Democrats.

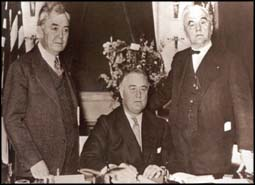
Roosevelt signing the Rural Electrification Act in 1935, with Rankin (left) and Senator George W. Norris (R-Nebraska) (right).

In 1920, Rankin ran once again for a seat in the U.S. House of Representatives, challenging Democratic incumbent Ezekiel Candler. During the campaign, Rankin pledged to support national Jim Crow laws, using his newspaper as a venue to promote his candidacy. With the support of the local labor unions, Rankin defeated Candler in a runoff. Rankin would serve sixteen consecutive terms (March 4, 1921 – January 3, 1953) as Mississippi's First District Representative.

=== Southern clout ===
Appointed to the Census Committee as a freshman congressman, Rankin played an important role in opposing a reapportionment bill that would have reduced the representation of Mississippi, as well as one to reduce the overall representation of the South. Both bills were based on the fact that Southern states had disenfranchised most of their black voters but kept apportionment based on total population in each state, resulting in outsize representation for their white populations. The powerful Democrats consistently defeated northern representatives' effort to reduce southern apportionment.

=== Bid for House speakership ===
In 1932, Rankin (at the time identified with the progressive wing of the Democratic Party) stood as a candidate for Speaker of the House. In the end, Rankin lost, gaining only 20 votes compared to 166 votes for the victor Henry T. Rainey and 112 for Rainey’s main rival John McDuffie.

=== Tennessee Valley Authority ===
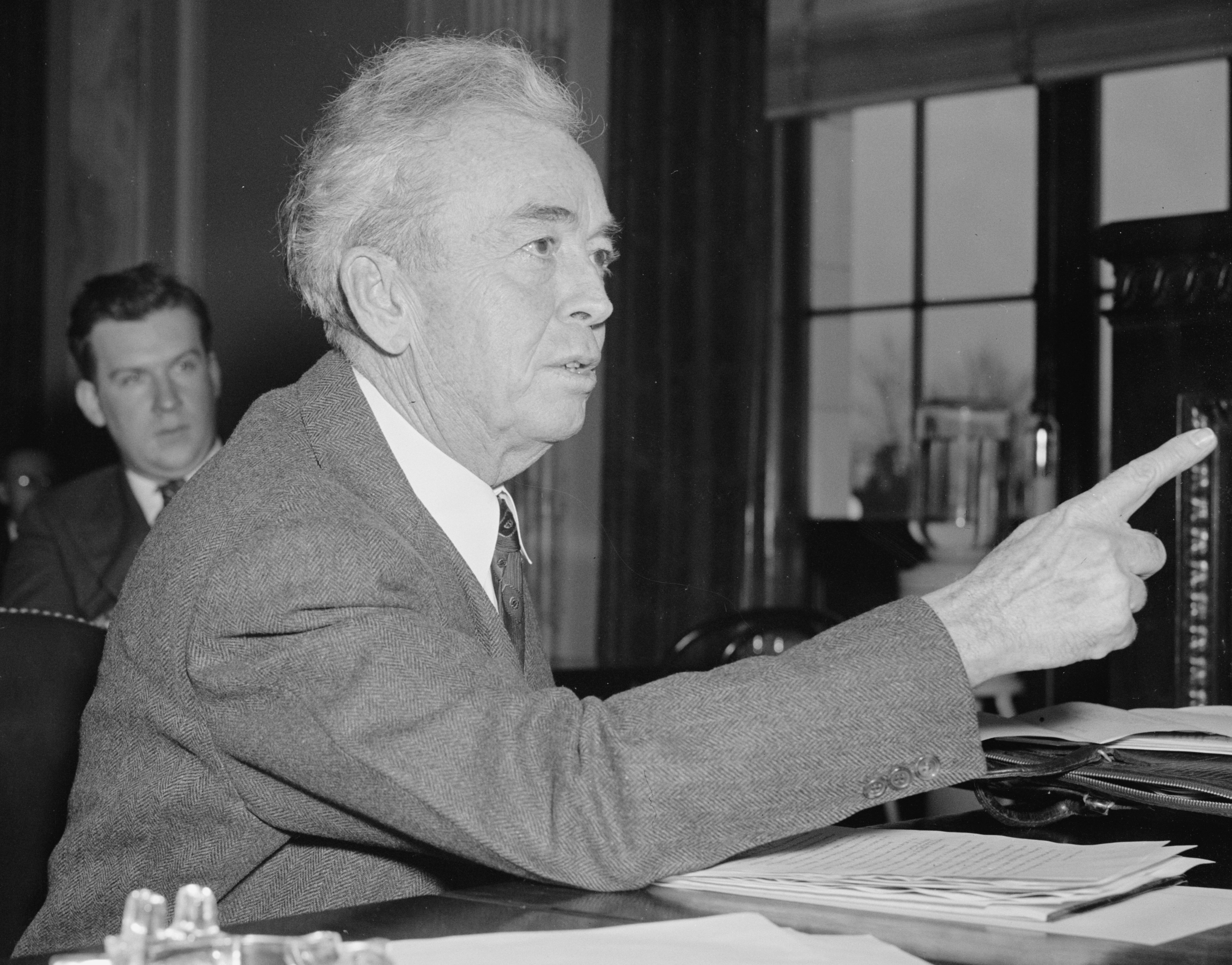
Rankin testifying before a joint congressional committee investigating the Tennessee Valley Authority in 1938.

Rankin coauthored the bill to create the Tennessee Valley Authority, bringing major investment into the rural South. He was a supporter of the Rural Electrification Administration under President Roosevelt's administration, which also benefited many Southerners. He strongly supported Roosevelt's New Deal and advocated economic intervention in poor rural communities, but expected that most benefits would flow to southern whites.

=== Support for segregation ===
He supported racial segregation and opposed civil rights legislation. He claimed that the constitutional rights of blacks were best protected through segregation throughout the United States, and that the racist use of a poll tax in elections was a defense against a Communist plot to undermine American elections.

After 1937, he became active in the Conservative Coalition that largely controlled domestic policy.

=== Populist issues ===
Rankin supported the Judicial Procedures Reform Bill of 1937, known as the "court-packing plan." The bill itself never came up for a vote in either congressional chamber, although he voted for its substitute version in the U.S. House that would have provided additional incentives for the retirement of U.S. Supreme Court justices in order to ensure new appointments by President Roosevelt.

Rankin opposed the creation of the UN, stating, "The United Nations is the greatest fraud in all History. Its purpose is to destroy the United States."

In the 1948 United States presidential election, Rankin opposed the re-election of President Harry S. Truman and supported the Dixiecrat ticket headed by Strom Thurmond and Fielding L. Wright. He was subsequently removed by the House Democratic leadership from the HUAC.

=== Veteran's affairs ===
Rankin chaired the Committee on World War Veterans' Legislation (Seventy-second through Seventy-ninth Congresses) and the Committee on Veterans' Affairs (Eighty-first and Eighty-second Congresses). In the first role he was the main House sponsor of the Servicemen's Readjustment Act of 1944, known as the G.I. Bill of Rights. Edward Humes says it was Rankin "who served as the primary force behind the version of the bill that actually got passed into law." He insisted on a provision that the federal program would be administered in a decentralized manner by the states. This ensured that southern states could continue to practice discrimination against black veterans. According to historian Gavin Wright, "In a comprehensive econometric analysis, Sarah Turner and John Bound find that although the GI Bill had substantial positive benefits for black and white veterans outside the South, those from the South made no significant gains in educational attainment."

Rankin sought to prevent the desegregation of VA hospitals. He argued for treating black veterans in rural, isolated all-black hospitals.

=== House Un-American Activities Committee ===
Rankin helped establish the House Un-American Activities Committee (HUAC) as a standing committee in Congress in February 1945 by leading the conservative coalition of Republicans and Southern Democrats. In the postwar years, he was active in probing the Communist Party, USA.

He was criticized for failing to investigate violence and murder perpetrated by chapters of the Ku Klux Klan. After HUAC's chief counsel Ernest Adamson announced: "The committee has decided that it lacks sufficient data on which to base a probe," Rankin added: "After all, the KKK is an old American institution."

Rankin called for Henry A. Wallace to be prosecuted under the Logan Act due to Wallace's tour of western Europe in 1947.

== Bigotry ==
=== African Americans ===
Rankin introduced a bill in 1920 to prohibit interracial marriage. During that decade, he opposed bills to make lynching a federal crime; although such a bill overwhelmingly passed the House, it was not approved by the Senate. In these positions, he was similar to other southern Democrats: he opposed other bills to support African American civil rights, such as any efforts toward desegregation and the elimination of poll taxes for federal elections. Poll taxes had been used by southern states to disfranchise most blacks and many poor whites since the turn of the century. Rankin argued that equal opportunity hiring practices (as required by the Roosevelt administration for defense contractors) "persecuted" whites, anti-lynching bills encouraged rape, and racial equality would destroy "the white man's civilization throughout the world."

During World War II, Rankin alleged that the U.S. Army's loss of a certain battle was due to the cowardice of black soldiers. Fellow Representative Helen Gahagan Douglas replied that many black soldiers had been decorated for bravery despite serving in a segregated Army. Rankin was known to use the slur "nigger" on the floor of the House.

When African American Adam Clayton Powell Jr. was elected to Congress from New York in 1944, Rankin vowed to avoid sitting next to him. In 1945, Powell, a fellow Democrat, called for Rankin's impeachment. Although freshmen congressmen were expected not to speak during their first year in office, Powell rose after one of Rankin's outbursts to say that "the time has arrived to impeach Rankin, or at least expel him from the party."

During a debate about the 1949 Peekskill Riots in Cortlandt Manor, Westchester County, New York, Rankin again used the word "nigger" while addressing the House. Violence had erupted after a racist mob of white anti-communists attacked people leaving a concert where the African American singer and political radical Paul Robeson had been performing. Rankin condemned Robeson for inciting the trouble because of his civil rights activism.

The next person to speak was Representative Jacob Javits (R-New York) who instead condemned the white mob in Peekskill for violating constitutional guarantees of freedom of speech and free assembly. Angered by these comments, Rankin bellowed, "It was not surprising to hear the gentleman from New York defend the Communist enclave." He then wanted it known that the American people are not in sympathy "with that nigger Communist and that bunch of Reds who went up there."

On a point of order, Representative Vito Marcantonio (R-New York) protested to House Speaker Sam Rayburn (D-Texas) that "the gentleman from Mississippi used the word 'nigger.' I ask that the word be taken down and stricken from the RECORD inasmuch as there are two members in this house of Negro race." Rayburn claimed that Rankin had not said "nigger" but "Negro"; but Rankin yelled over him, saying "I said Negro! Just as I have said since I have been able to talk and shall continue to say." Speaker Rayburn defended Rankin, ruling that "the gentleman from Mississippi is not subject to a point of order... referred to the Negro race and they should not be afraid of that designation."

=== American Jews ===
Rankin was antisemitic and frequently combined racism against African Americans with invective against American Jews. In a 1943 speech on the floor of the House quoted in both The Jewish News of Detroit and the antisemitic magazine The Defender of Wichita he said,

When those communistic Jews—of whom the decent Jews are ashamed—go around here and hug and kiss these Negroes, dance with them, intermarry with them, and try to force their way into white restaurants, white hotels and white picture shows, they are not deceiving any red-blooded American, and, above all, they are not deceiving the men in our armed forces—as to who is at the bottom of all this race trouble.

The better element of the Jews, and especially the old line American Jews throughout the South and West, are not only ashamed of, but they are alarmed at, the activities of these communistic Jews who are stirring this trouble up.

They have caused the deaths of many good Negroes who never would have got into trouble if they had been left alone, as well as the deaths of many good white people, including many innocent, unprotected white girls, who have been raped and murdered by vicious Negroes, who have been encouraged by those alien-minded Communists to commit such crimes.

In a paper by William L. Strickland, professor of political science at the University of Massachusetts Amherst, he observes that "Rankin was an equal opportunity bigot" as he once — on the floor of the House of Representatives — called the Jewish newspaper columnist Walter Winchell "the little kike." This incident, reported by Time magazine in its February 14, 1944 issue, inspired the novelist Laura Z. Hobson to write her story about antisemitism, Gentleman's Agreement (1947).

Rankin claimed that the Immigration and Nationality Act was opposed solely by American Jews:

They whine about discrimination. Do you know who is being discriminated against? The white Christian people of America, the ones who created this nation ... I am talking about the white Christian people of the North as well as the South ... Communism is racial. A racial minority seized control in Russia and in all her satellite countries, such as Poland, Czechoslovakia, and many other countries I could name. They have been run out of practically every country in Europe in the years gone by, and if they keep stirring race trouble in this country and trying to force their communistic program on the Christian people of America, there is no telling what will happen to them here.

In late 1945, Albert Einstein backed calls for the United States to break off diplomatic relations with Spain's leader Francisco Franco, because the Spanish dictator had been an ally of Adolf Hitler. Rankin condemned Einstein on the floor of Congress, calling him a "foreign-born agitator" who sought "to further the spread of Communism throughout the world."

An article in an ADL Bulletin, entitled "The Plot Against Anna M. Rosenberg", attributed the attacks on Rosenberg's loyalty to "professional anti-Semites and lunatic nationalists," including the "Jew-baiting cabal of John Rankin, Benjamin H. Freedman and Gerald Smith."

Rankin introduced a resolution to investigate the ADL, "that subversive organization." Representative Emanuel Celler called this a "canard," which Rankin objected was a personal attack.

During the 1951 espionage trial of Julius and Ethel Rosenberg, who were charged with and convicted of passing information about the atomic bomb to the Soviet Union, Rankin was condemned by Jewish groups for repeatedly calling the Rosenbergs a pair of "communist kikes".

=== Japanese Americans ===
In his first term as representative, Rankin introduced an anti-miscegenation bill to prevent whites from marrying "Mongolians" and African Americans. A decade later, in 1930 he lobbied against Hawaii's bid for statehood on the grounds that it would add "two Jap senators" to Congress.

Rankin was one of the few Southern congressmen to support West Coast politicians and lobbyists calling for the mass incarceration of Japanese Americans, proposing that every person of Japanese ancestry in the United States be deported at the end of the war. He reintroduced a defeated "concentration camp bill" to remove ethnic Japanese from the country and all U.S. territories. (Most ethnic Japanese Americans were removed from the West Coast.) As the war progressed, he continued to speak out against Japanese Americans, testifying in favor of labeling Japanese and African American blood donations to prevent them from "contaminating" white recipients and limiting the segregated 442nd Regimental Combat Team to labor battalions instead of active combat.

== Senatorial aspirations ==
In 1947 Rankin ran for the Democratic nomination for the U.S. Senate that was vacated by the death of Theodore G. Bilbo in office. He finished last among five major candidates with 13% of the vote.

== Final years and death ==
In 1952, Rankin was defeated for re-nomination to the House by fellow Democratic Congressman Thomas G. Abernethy after their districts were joined through redistricting. At that time, most blacks in Mississippi were still disenfranchised, a status that persisted until after Congressional passage of the Voting Rights Act of 1965.

Rankin died at his home in Tupelo on November 26, 1960. He is interred in Greenwood Cemetery in West Point, Mississippi.

== See also ==
- List of members of the House Un-American Activities Committee

== Bibliography ==
- Allen, Robert L. (1989). The Port Chicago Mutiny. New York, NY: Warner Books. ISBN 978-0-446-71004-6. OCLC 18383070. OL 2046539M.
- Caro, Robert A. (2002). The Years of Lyndon Johnson: Master of the Senate. Vol. 3. New York, NY: Alfred A. Knopf. ISBN 978-0-394-52836-6.
- Clark, Jim (March 18, 2016). "John E. Rankin March 29, 1882–Nov. 26, 1960". Lee County Courier. Archived from the original on 2021-09-21.
- Conrat, Maisie; Conrat, Richard (1992) [1972]. Executive Order 9066: The Internment of 110,000 Japanese Americans (New ed.). Los Angeles, CA: Asian American Studies Center, University of California, Los Angeles. ISBN 978-0-934052-19-1.
- Dallek, Robert (1991). Lone Star Rising: Lyndon Johnson and His Times, 1908–1960. Vol. 1. New York, NY & Oxford, England: Oxford University Press. ISBN 978-0-19-507904-3. OL 7387200M.
- "Die-Hard Dixie Demos Fight Gavagan Bill". California Eagle. Associated Negro Press. April 23, 1937. p. 1 – via Newspapers.com.
- Duberman, Martin Bauml (1989). Paul Robeson. New York, NY: Alfred A. Knopf. ISBN 978-0-394-52780-2. OL 2062013M.
- Edelson, Chris (2013). Emergency Presidential Power: From the Drafting of the Constitution to the War on Terror. Madison, WI: University of Wisconsin Press. ISBN 978-0-299-29530-1. OL 26918872M.
- Ford, Carin T. (2008). Paul Robeson: 'I Want to Make Freedom Ring'. African-American Biography Library. Berkeley Heights, NJ: Enslow. ISBN 978-0-7660-2703-9. OL 8056648M.
- Grillot, Thomas; Peretz, Pauline; Philippe, Yann (September 2020). "'Wherever the Authority of the Federal Government Extends': Banning Segregation in Veterans' Hospitals (1945–1960)". The Journal of American History. 107 (2): 388–410. doi:10.1093/jahist/jaaa181.
- Gunther, John (1947). Inside U.S.A.. London, England: Hamish Hamilton.
- Harcourt, Felix (2017). Ku Klux Kulture: America and the Klan in the 1920s. Chicago, IL: University of Chicago Press. ISBN 978-0-226-63793-8.
- Haygood, Wil (1993). King of the Cats: The Life and Times of Adam Clayton Powell, Jr. Boston, MA & New York, NY: Houghton Mifflin Company. ISBN 978-0-395-44094-0. OL 1727574M.
- Herzinger, Kyna (June 22, 2020). "John Rankin". Densho Encyclopedia. Archived from the original on 2024-05-23.
- Hobson, Laura Z. (1983). Laura Z: A Life. Vol. 1. New York, NY: Arbor House. ISBN 978-0-87795-469-9.
- "House Vote #11 in 1937 (75th Congress): TO PASS H. R. 2518, (P. A. 10), A BILL PROVIDING FOR THE RETIREMENT OF JUSTICES OF THE SUPREME COURT. Feb 10, 1937". GovTrack. Archived from the original on 2024-06-15.
- Humes, Edward (2006). Over Here: How the G.I. Bill Transformed the American Dream. Orlando, FL: Harcourt. ISBN 978-0-15-100710-3.
- Kern, Gary (2003). A Death in Washington: Walter G. Krivitsky and the Stalin Terror. New York, NY: Enigma. ISBN 978-1-929631-14-8.
- Michels, Tony (2005). A Fire in Their Hearts: Yiddish Socialists in New York. Cambridge, MA & London, England: Harvard University Press. ISBN 978-0-674-01913-3.
- "The Peekskill Riot" (PDF). Congressional Record. 95 (Part 10): 13124. September 21, 1949.
- Rankin, John E. (April 23, 1952). "United States Needs Liberalized, Not Restrictive, Immigration" (PDF). Congressional Record. 98 (Part 4): 4320.
- "RANKIN, John Elliott (1882–1960)". Biographical Directory of the United States Congress.
- Reichley, A. James (2000) [1992]. The Life of the Parties: A History of American Political Parties (Updated ed.). Lanham, MD: Rowman & Littlefield. ISBN 978-0-7425-0888-0.
- Rowe, David E.; Schulmann, Robert (June 25, 2007). "What Were Einstein's Politics?". History News Network. Archived from the original on 2024-08-09.
- Schmidt, Karl M. (1960). Henry A. Wallace: Quixotic Crusade 1948. Men and Movements Series. Syracuse, NY: Syracuse University Press. ISBN 978-0-8156-0020-6. OCLC 475793. OL 28125483M.
- Slomovitz, Philip (July 16, 1943). "A Rest From Bigotry". The Jewish News. Vol. 3, no. 17. p. 4. Archived from the original on 2021-04-27 – via The Detroit Jewish News Digital Archive, Bentley Historical Library, University of Michigan.
- Strickland, William (Bill) (March 26, 2009). "Du Bois'S Revenge: Reinterrogating American Democratic Theory... Or Why We Need a Revolutionary Black Research Agenda In the 21st Century". The Black Commentator. Archived from the original on 2011-07-26.
- Svonkin, Stuart (1997). Jews Against Prejudice: American Jews and the Fight for Civil Liberties. Columbia Studies in Contemporary American History. New York, NY: Columbia University Press. ISBN 978-0-231-10639-9.
- Vickers, Kenneth W. (1993). John Rankin: Democrat and Demagogue (MA thesis). Mississippi State University. OCLC 30880294. ProQuest 230702821.
- "Will Soldiers Vote?". Time. Vol. 43, no. 7. February 14, 1944. pp. 17–18. Archived from the original on 2024-08-08.
- Winrod, Gerald B., ed. (September 1943). "Congressman Says Negroes Deceived" (PDF). The Defender. Vol. 18, no. 5. pp. 12–13. Archived (PDF) from the original on 2013-05-30 – via Harold Weisberg Archive, Beneficial-Hodson Library, Hood College.
- Woods, Jeff (2004). Black Struggle, Red Scare: Segregation and Anti-Communism in the South, 1948–1968. Baton Rouge, LA: Louisiana State University Press. ISBN 978-0-8071-2926-5. OL 3677828M.
- Wright, Gavin (2010). "The New Deal and the Modernization of the South" (PDF). Federal History (2): 58–73. ISSN 1943-8036. Archived (PDF) from the original on 2022-05-19.
- Zwiers, Maarten (July 11, 2017). "John Elliott Rankin". Mississippi Encyclopedia. Center for Study of Southern Culture. Archived from the original on 2019-11-10.

U.S. House of Representatives
Preceded by Ezekiel S. Candler, Jr.	Member of the U.S. House of Representatives from Mississippi's 1st congressional district 1921–1953	Succeeded by Thomas Abernethy
