= Charles B. Hudson =

Charles B. Hudson may refer to:

- Charles Britton Hudson (born 1974), the lead guitarist of the US rock band Blue October
- Charles B. Hudson, writer for Conde McGinley's newspaper Common Sense
