= Benjamin H. Freedman =

American businessman (1890–1984)

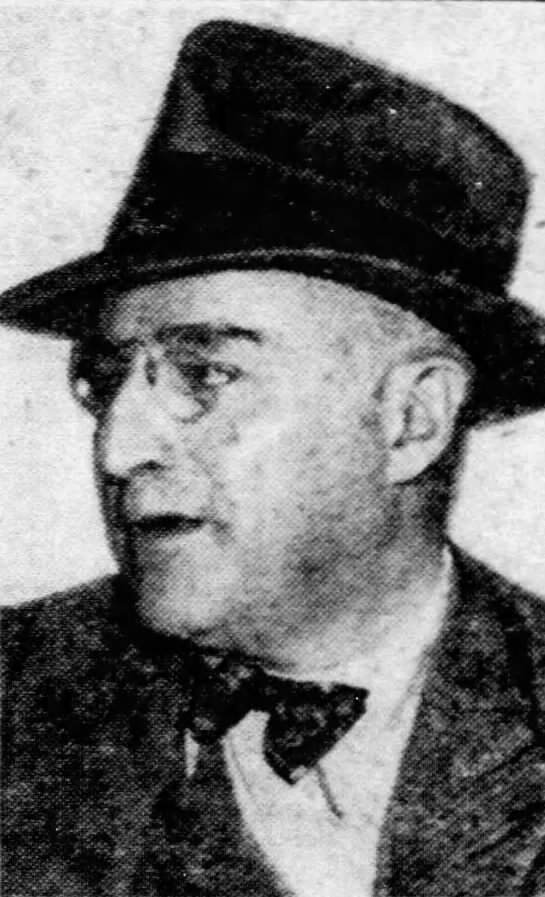
- Freedman in 1959
- Born: Benjamin Harrison Freedman; October 4, 1890; New York City, New York, U.S
- Died: May 1984 (aged 93); Garden City, New York, U.S
- Occupations: Businessman, principal owner of the Woodbury Soap Company
- Known for: Anti-Zionism
- Spouse: Rose Schoendorf

Benjamin Harrison Freedman (October 4, 1890 – May 1984) was an American businessman, Holocaust denier, and vocal anti-Zionist. Born in a Jewish family, he converted from Judaism to Roman Catholicism. Outside of political activism, Freedman was a partner in a dermatological institute and investor for small businesses.

== Early life and career ==
Benjamin Harrison Freedman was born October 4, 1890, in New York City. Born in a Jewish family, he later converted from Judaism to Roman Catholicism.

From 1925 to 1937, Freedman was a partner with Samuel D. Leidesdorf in the John H. Woodbury Laboratories, a dermatological institute and a derivative company of the old Woodbury Soap Company. Benjamin H Freedman was listed on the letterhead of the Institute for Arab American Affairs and around 1946, along with his wife, listed as "R M Schoendorf" (Rose M. Schoendorf Freedman), "sponsored a series of advertisements under the imprint of 'The League for Peace with Justice in Palestine'". In 1946, he sued the American Jewish Committee for libel and the case was thrown out in less than a month.

== Activities ==
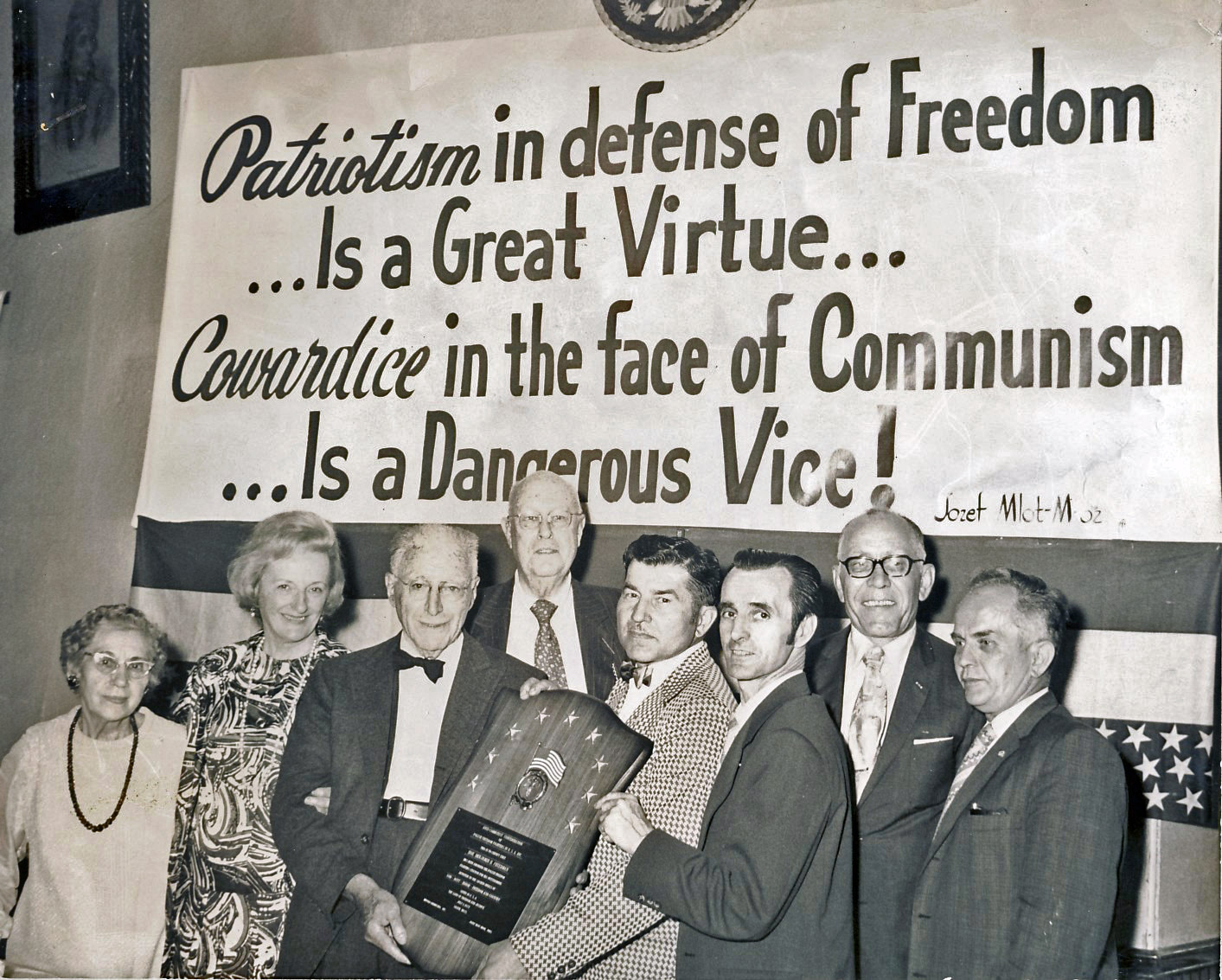
Benjamin H. Freedman (third from left) at the age of 82, receiving the Service award from Jozef Mlot-Mroz (fourth from right) of the Anti-Communist Federation of Polish Freedom Fighters in Salem, Massachusetts, 1972. Freedman's wife, Rose Schoendorf, depicted at the far left

Freemdan was a Holocaust denier, and vocal anti-Zionist. He was a financial backer of the author Conde McGinley, publisher of the antisemitic periodical Common Sense. In the 1955 libel trial by Rabbi Joachim Prinz against McGinley, Freedman testified that "he [Freedman] had given Mr. McGinley financial support of 'more than $10,000 but less than $100,000'". Prinz had sued McGinley for calling him a "red rabbi."

Freedman opposed the nomination of Anna M. Rosenberg to be United States Assistant Secretary of Defense in 1950. An article in the ADL Bulletin titled The Plot Against Ann Rosenberg attributed the attacks on Rosenberg's loyalty to "professional anti-Semites and lunatic nationalists", including the "Jew-baiting cabal of John Rankin, Benjamin Freedman, and Gerald Smith".

Freedman, an apostate Jew, was well known to the Anti-Defamation League and the American Jewish Committee as an active supporter of the Arab cause in the Middle East. (fn 33) In the course of his erratic and often contradictory testimony before the Senate committee, Freedman revealed the roles played by anti-Semitic agitators and right-wing anticommunists — including Gerald L. K. Smith, Conde McGinley, the "Reverend" Wesley Swift, Congressman John Rankin, Senator Joseph McCarthy, and J. B. Matthews — in the campaign against the Rosenberg appointment. (fn 34)

He is mentioned in a report by the House Un-American Activities Committee.

== Death ==
Freedman was politically active until the mid-1970s when he was well over 85 years old. Freedman died in May 1984, in Garden City, New York, aged 93.

== Works ==
- League for Peace With Justice in Palestine. Freedman published his own broadsheets under the aegis of the League for Peace With Justice in Palestine, which he founded in 1946.
- "Palestine," Destiny: The Magazine of National Life (Jan. 1948): 26–28 (originally appeared in the National Economic Council's Letter, no. 177, Oct. 15, 1947). Haverhill, Mass.
- Facts are Facts, Noontide Press (Softcover), ISBN 0-317-53273-1. A pamphlet purporting to be the text of a 1954 letter from Freedman to David Goldstein, proponent of the idea that Christianity fulfilled Judaism. The text expounds the notion that most people now identified as Jews are descendants of Khazars, a Turkic people of Central Asia who converted to Judaism. Freedman does not refer to Jews, but to "so-called or 'self-styled Jews'".
- Why Congress is Crooked or Crazy or Both, Founder, 1946, League for Peace with Justice in Palestine (New York, 1975)
