= 1938 New York City truckers strike =

Citywide transportation strike

1938 New York City truckers' strike
- Date: September 15, 1938 – October 2, 1938
- Location: United States
- Caused by: Contract expiration
- Goals: 40 Hr. Week; No reduction in weekly pay
- Result: Union Victory: Reduction to 44-hour week; All previous benefits & protections

Parties
Teamsters (IBT) Union Initial: NYC Teamsters; Local 807; Local 282; Local 816; Later (Sept 26): Teamsters' Joint Council No. 18 of New Jersey; Local 560; Local 641; Local 617; Local 136; Local 478; Local 469; Motor & Bus Terminal Checker Platform & Office Workers; Local 21; Local 512; Allies: Sailor's Union of the Pacific; International Longshoremen's Association; C.I.O; Atlantic City Trucker Union; Philadelphia Joint Council 53 of the Brotherhood of Teamsters; 7 locals; Gasoline Station's Attendents' Union; Local 20408; Newark Teamster; Local 863	NYC Government: Mayor La Guardia; Acting Mayor Newbold Morris; NYPD Lewis J. Valentine Mediators: Anna M. Rosenberg; Arthur S. Meyer; Corporate groups: Highway Transport Association Merchant Truckmen's Bureau Merchant Associations of NY Publishers Association Associated Express and Truck Owners of New Jersey

Number
30,000–35,000 Strikers	
- Previous contract: 47 hour week, $56.50 a week

The New York City truckers' strike started on September 15, 1938, as an unsanctioned strike by some of NYC's Teamsters members, with union leadership initially opposing it. It was caused by a contract expiration, demanding lower hours at the same weekly pay and by its end somewhere between 30,000 and 35,000 strikers were directly involved.

On September 25, it was officially sanctioned by a union vote at the Mecca Temple by union Locals 807, 282, and 816. According to the Bureau of Labor Statistics, it was one of the largest US strikes of 1938.

The strike ended in October as a partial union victory, they won lower hours at the same weekly pay & benefits, but it was not lowered to the demanded maximum 40-hour week but instead to a maximum 44-hour week limit.

== Background ==
The immediate beginnings of the strike originate from the expiration of the Teamsters Locals 807, 282, 816's previous contract on September 1, 1938.

On Wednesday, September 14, a meeting was held at the Manhattan Opera House. The executive committee of the unions reported on their negotiations with the Merchant Truckmen's Bureau for a new contract to the rest of the members.

Negotiations had started six weeks earlier, in anticipation of the contract expiring, employers had originally pushed for a pay cut. While union members had been calling for a reduction from a 47 to a 40-hour week, without any pay cut ($56.50/week) and one week's vacation. One motivation behind this was to spread work to the 4,000 unemployed members of the drivers unions.

At the meeting, the executive committee reported that the employers had backed away from cutting pay instead proposing to extend on the previous contract's terms.

It was then taken to a vote on whether to accept these negotiations, with members voting to reject them. During this meeting around 1,000 workers also stood up and cheered for a strike. However, no strike vote was held.

== Course of the labor dispute ==
=== The 'Outlaw Strike' ===
==== 15th ====
On September 15, unions members, principally from Local 807, began an unsanctioned strike within New York City. Believing that negotiators were not making a genuine effort to win shorter hours at the same weekly wage.

The strike froze up much of interstate trucking in and out of NYC, using driving pickets throughout the downtown waterfront district to shut down work. Special police details were deployed at 8 am, in an unsuccessful attempt to stop the picket line. Somewhere between 300 and 400 trucking firms stopped operations the same day because of it.

At some point strikers formed their own separate elected leadership to head a strike committee.

Union officers attempted to convince the strikers, with an order to return to work issued later that night by the executive committee. Newbold Morris, was the acting mayor of NYC, as Mayor La Guardia was on a tour of the US South and West, partially to attend the American Legion conference.

==== 16th ====
On the morning of September 16, around 1,000 strikers, of the three local unions, voted in a meeting at St. John's Park for a general strike of truck drivers in NYC waterfront to start the next morning at 6 am. They then sent this information over to the union executive committee. A union officer that stayed anonymous estimated that around 5,000 truck drivers were involved in this initial strike. Police presence was significantly increased alongside the East and West side waterfronts, and sent to strike areas, in response to the strike.

Michael J. Cashal, Teamsters Vice President, promised that even in the case of a general trucking strike, newsprint would be excluded from the strike. William Devery, president of Local 807 also commented on the strike. Saying each union officer was trying to get the men to return to work. But, that the strikers would not be expelled because they were, "fighting for the same principle as their officers, namely the five-day, forty-hour week." At this time foodstuffs remained unaffected by the strike.

==== 17–18th ====
On September 18, Acting Mayor Newbold Morris successfully asked the 'outlaw' strikers to ship food supplies from the Emergency Relief Bureau to home relief depots (people were evacuating, due to the yet to hit New England hurricane) and ballots for New York's primary election. At the time accusations were made by the union that non-relief workers had been used to load supplies at the Bronx Terminal Market.

The same day, the Merchant Truckmen's Bureau of NY and Highway Transport Association jointly announced they had accepted an invitation to a City Hall settlement negotiations arranged by Mayor La Guardia from San Francisco the day before.

==== 19th ====
On September 19, a mass meeting was held at the 69th Regiment Armory, (Note: Sometimes also referred to as the 165th Infantry Regiment Armory in historical sources. (see history of 69th Infantry Regiment, New York)) between striking workers and the NYC Government. It was attended by 4,000–5,000 of the striking workers among others.

One of the leaders of the 'outlaw' strike Abe Klein, commented in interview at City Hall:

"The rank and file of the union feel that the Highway Transport Association of which Joseph M. Adelizzi and Jack Sullivan are the heads, is trying to use a Federal indictment against our officers and the membership to force us into a lower wage scale contract."

He cited the recent indictment, that was put against 67 officers and members of the union, among other people, under the Sherman Antitrust Act and the then new federal anti-racketeering laws.

On the government side, Newbold Morris, & the New York Social Security Board members Anna M. Rosenberg & Arthur S. Meyer, who called for the workers to end the strike pending negotiations, which strikers rejected. Newbold Morris called for five-day truce, which was loudly rejected. Then they proposed a three-day truce which was again rejected, with some strikers reportedly holding up 2 fingers to suggest they would prefer two days. However a truce was still rejected.

During this meeting, the NY branch of the Sailor's Union of the Pacific announced their support for, and intention to not cross, any trucker picket lines held on piers where they dock.

Picketing by strikers continued in the city, one of the focuses was the Holland Tunnel which connects New York and New Jersey. That day several hundred picketers were present and shouted to truck drivers from the sidewalk to pullover and redirected them to park at the Hudson while they communicated with their employers. According to the NYT, the vast majority of truckers would not cross the picket line.

==== 20th ====
By September 20, 12,000 NYC truckers were striking and it had spread to three locals in New Jersey that same morning. Of the strikers, 5,000 teamster truckers were running driving pickets to stop trucking business inside the city.

An editorial in the Socialist Appeal disagreed with the assessment of other newspapers of it as an 'outlaw' strike. Arguing mass support among the workers and on the basis that while leadership hadn't explicitly supported it, they specifically avoided punishing it.

==== 21st ====
On September 21, acting mayor Newbold Morris (with the wired telegraph approval from mayor La Guardia in LA), gave an ultimatum to drivers to end the strike within 24 hours. That afternoon the New England hurricane made landfall in Long Island as a Category 3 hurricane.

According to the NYT's, the strike also spread to Westchester County, and Connecticut. The strike also shut down delivery's for 1939 New York World's Fair construction, lead to the Eastern Steamship Lines stopping their southern division temporarily because of freight piling up on the pier, and led freight to accumulate for both the Pennsylvania's and New York Central Railroads in their yards & warehouses.

The expanding nature of the strike led to New York State Federation of Labor president George Meany and Thomas Lyons of the Central Trades and Labor Council to be included in negotiations. Alongside the already included Teamster vice president, Michael J. Cashal.

That midnight, the unions agreed to a truce starting the next day and lasting until Saturday, September 24. During which the union temporarily returned to work. And after which, if an agreement hadn't been reached, the union would then take an official strike vote encompassing the entire union.

==== 22–24th ====
On September 22, the unions and employers groups met from 2–6 pm to negotiate, after which George Meany of New York State Federation of Labor criticized the operators for offering the union "absolutely nothing", adding that if that was maintained there would be "a real strike".

That day Walter B. Holt, the vice president of the International Longshoremen's Association when asked, said they would support the strike if it occurred again, given it was an official vote.

During this period goods were rushed from piers and warehouses with many union workers receiving overtime pay due to the longer hours. Reportedly as an attempt by employers to prepare for any potential resumption of the strike by building up a surplus of supplies. However, some of the damage to the roads from the hurricane partially hampered this.

On September 24 midnight, the truce expired. Union members swiftly voted to continue the strike on September 25.

=== Sanctioned strike ===
On September 25, 3:30 pm the strike was officially sanctioned by a union vote at the Mecca Temple by Locals 807, 282, and 816. The vote count was 4,071, in favor, to 365. Food, medicine and newsprint were exempted from the strike through this vote.

Mayor La Guardia returned the same day after a three-week trip of the US South and West, during which Newbold Morris had been the acting mayor.

==== Final days ====
On September 26, 11:30 am, 20,000 (Note: 12,000 in Hudson and adjoining counties, 5,000 in Newark, and 3,000 in Perth Amboy) teamster drivers in New Jersey officially voted to concurrently strike alongside the New York truckers for the same conditions.

Around 30,000 truck drivers in total were striking within Greater New York and New Jersey area.

Francis M. Sheridan, general organizer of Motor & Bus Terminal Checker Platform & Office Workers also announced that day that they would be joining the strike. The C.I.O (a part of the A.F.L) also announced its support for the strike.

The Longshoremen's Association, whose contract would expire in 4 days, reiterated they would not cross the picket line or handle "hot" cargo i.e. from any companies involved with the strike. They also mentioned they would similarly be demanding a reduction of their work week, from 44 to 40 hours a week.

Sanitation trucks at NYC City Hall
- Profile view photo
- Overhead photo

The same day, 1,000 emergency sanitation vehicles were stationed outside city hall and prepared by Mayor La Guardia in response.

At the time, accusations were made that materials headed for the New England and Long Island communities, which had suffered from floods due to the New England hurricane, were being blocked by the strike. However strikers claimed to allow these goods to travel, only stopping and checking trucks attempting to carry non-exempt goods under false 'flood signs'. This connects to a modern-day practice under current union law in the US, known as neutral gates.

Connecticut governor, Wilbur L. Cross urged a truce that day, in a telegram to the Associated Press, representing other governors as the chairman of a New England governors conference held in Boston.

The truckmen unions within Philadelphia (Atlantic City Trucker Union, Philadelphia Joint Council 53 of the Brotherhood of Teamsters) were also going to meet with the Camden, New Jersey Teamster local the next day to decide on joining the strike. It comprised seven different Philadelphia locals, with Local 107 alone having 8,000 members.

That night Mayor La Guardia proposed a contract between the workers and corporate associations. The conditions were as follows:

1. The contract term will be two years
2. A working week will be 44 hours, at the same total weekly pay as the previous 47-hour week.
3. A basic day will be 8 hours long from 8am-4pm Mon-Fri, & four hours long on Saturday.
4. Pay on Saturday will be 1.5x normal daily pay and any work past eight hours for a day will be subject to special overtime pay.
5. No employee will work more than 44 hours a week, not even under overtime.

The striking workers voted to accept these terms. While the Highway Transport Association & Merchant Associations of NY representing the trucking corporations, voted to reject it early the next morning on September 27 at 1:40 am. The Merchant Associations of NY represented 500 members/businesses within NY.

Reportedly according to one source, during this meeting a shoe was hurled from a balcony at Michael Cashal, Teamster Vice President, hitting him in the thigh. After which Cashal reportedly stepped away from a microphone with anger and shouted.

In response to the rejection of the deal, the sanitation vehicles were then deployed by Mayor La Guardia the same day manned by pairs with one union member & one NYC sanitation department worker. Its efforts were directed by a group called the Mayor's Citizen's Committee filled with other business owners within NYC, such as rail, reportedly uninvolved in the businesses involved in the strike. This was done through the declaration of a public emergency. To ship foodstuffs and other materials.

=== End of strike ===
That same day, around 50 NYC businesses, that the associations represented, signed and around 35 businesses in New Jersey signed, both under the terms proposed by La Guardia.

Piecemeal, a significant portion of the represented companies signed under the terms individually over the next few days. By September 30, most metropolitan transportation was back to normal.

However, interstate firms, represented by the Highway Transportation Association, refused to accept Mayor La Guardia's compromise proposal. In response an ultimatum was delivered by Walter J. Burke, president of Local 20408 of the Gasoline Station Attendants' Union on the night of September 29. Unless the strike was settled in 48 hours, 2,000 gasoline stations would be closed in the five boroughs by a sympathy strike from their 8,000 to 10,000 union gas station workers.

That same day, on September 29, Newark Teamster Local 863, a union of moving firm drivers, called a one-day sympathy strike in support of the striking New Jersey Teamster truck drivers.

48 hours later, the strike officially ended for most on October 2 when the Highway Transport Association signed the contract agreement with Teamster Local 807. The same day the Associated Express and Truck Owners of New Jersey also signed the agreement ending the strike in New Jersey. The strike is mostly regarded as a partial union victory, by the workers at the time and in retrospect by the Teamsters union.

In December, the smaller Checker Platform & Office Workers Union, who joined the strike on September 26, would also win their contract after other unions held walkout sympathy strikes.

== Aftermath ==
=== Regulations ===
Before the strike, on December 29, 1937, the Interstate Commerce Commission announced its finalized hours of service trucking regulations effective July 1, 1938 under the Motor Carrier Act (1935). These original Motor Carrier Safety rules would have limited on-duty trucking hours to 60 hours a week, 15 hours max on-duty in a day, and 12 hours of working in a day. With this it also required that a daily log be kept. Lastly, it approved sleeper cabs, in spite of organized labor's criticisms of it being unsafe.

The hour regulations were immediately criticized by those within organized labor. With the American Federation of Labor, the Teamsters, and the Machinists petitioning for a pause of the regulations. William Green, president of the American Federation of Labor on January 7 released a public letter of protest which was sent to Joseph B. Eastman of the I.C.C. Stating,

After twenty years of operation of an eight-hour basic workday for employees of the railroad industry... it seems needless for me to comment on the patent unreasonableness of a fifteen-hour day as a standard specifically approved by the [I.C.C] for the motor bus and trucking industries.

Since at the time, the eight hour day was the generally recognized standard for workers. They argued implementing such a high limit as a legal standard, and claiming it is the safe driving limit, would simply be used by trucking companies to lengthen their hourly demands for workers, in effect making the eight hour day a more difficult goal. So on June 14, the implementation of the rule was delayed till August 1.

Then in July, following pressure from organized labor, who called for an 8-hour daily limit & 48 hour weekly limit. They lowered the limit from 12 to 10 hours of working a day. While the 60 hour weekly limit remained unchanged and the effective date delayed again until October 1.

Between this period the New York trucker strike occurred, the role that the strike could have played within the regulations timeline is unclear. However at some point during it the regulation was delayed again, till it was officially implemented on March 1, 1939.

=== 1946 strike ===
Later on in 1946, the NYC Teamsters would win the reduction to a 40-hour maximum week, with a $7.40 (equivalent to $132.34 in 2025) weekly pay raise, following a 31,000 person trucker strike in the city.

== See also ==
- 2005 New York City transit strike
- 1937 New York City department store strikes
- 1919 New York City Harbor Strike
