= Mum (deodorant) =

Brand of deodorant

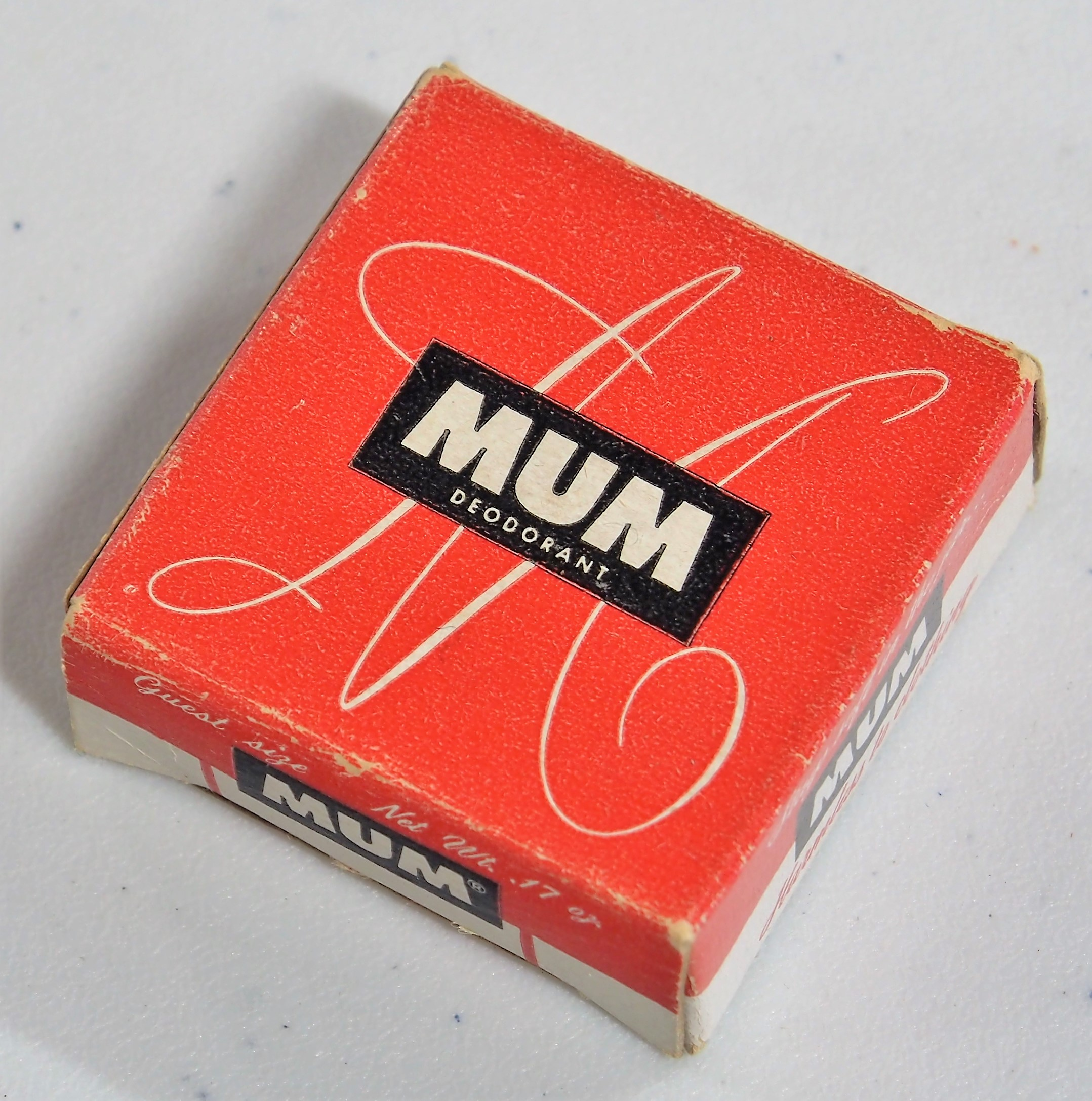
A former version of "MUM" deodorant (discontinued)

Mum is a deodorant containing zinc compound as its active ingredient, and developed in Philadelphia in 1888. It was the first commercial deodorant brand. According to the manufacturer's web-site, "The MUM brand owes its name to a nurse of the inventor, who was nicknamed "Mum". Another source claims that the brand was named after the term "mum" from the phrase "Mum's the word", meaning to keep silent. Mum was originally sold as a cream in a jar and applied with the fingertips. The small company was bought by Bristol-Myers in 1931.

== Branding as "Ban" ==
In the late 1940s, an employee (Helen Diserens) developed an applicator based on the newly invented ball-point pen. In 1952, the company began marketing the product under the name Ban Roll-On. In 1958, the product was launched in the United Kingdom and the Commonwealth of Nations as Mum Rollette.

The product was briefly withdrawn from the market in the United States, but is again widely available.

It is popular in Australia, Mexico, Peru, Singapore, South Africa, the United Kingdom and Venezuela. In the Philippines, it was sold in the 1970s and 1980s but has since been withdrawn.

Ban is now owned by Kao Corporation.

In the UK Mum is made by Dendron Ltd, under license from The Procter & Gamble Co.
