= Bondi Sands =

Australian tanning and skincare products brand

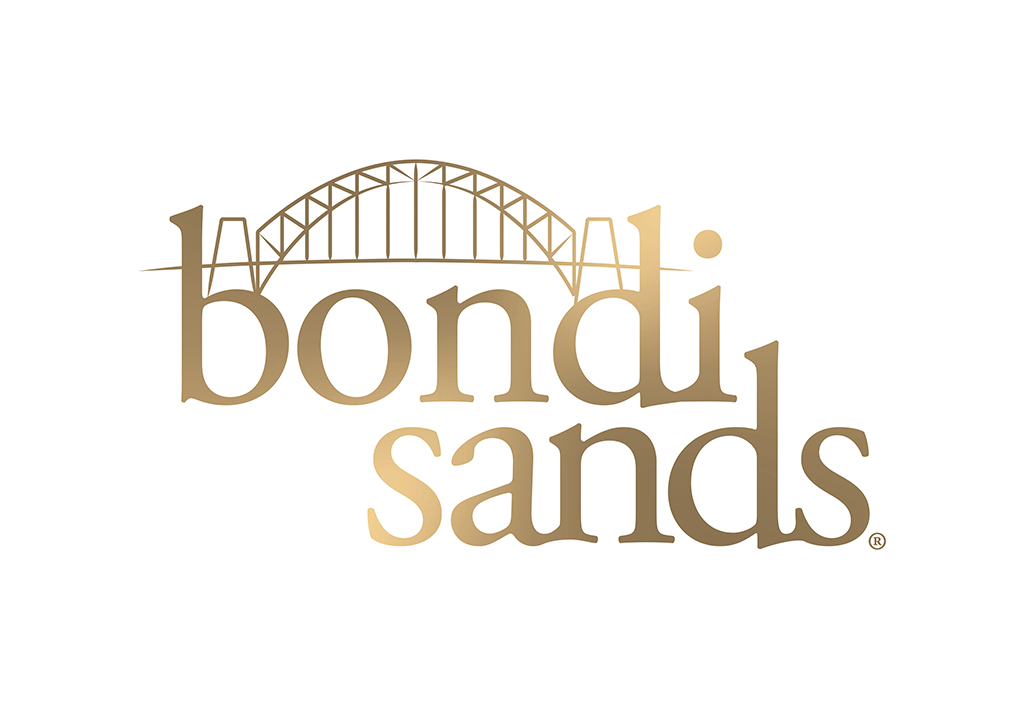
- Type: Subsidiary company
- Industry: retail
- Founded: 2012; 14 years ago
- Founders: Blair James, Shaun Wilson
- Headquarters: Melbourne, Australia
- Area served: worldwide
- Key people: Blair James, Shaun Wilson
- Products: Cosmetics; Skin Care; Sun Care; Self Tan
- Owner: Kao Corporation
- Number of employees: 150
- Parent: Kao Corporation
- Website: bondisands.com.au

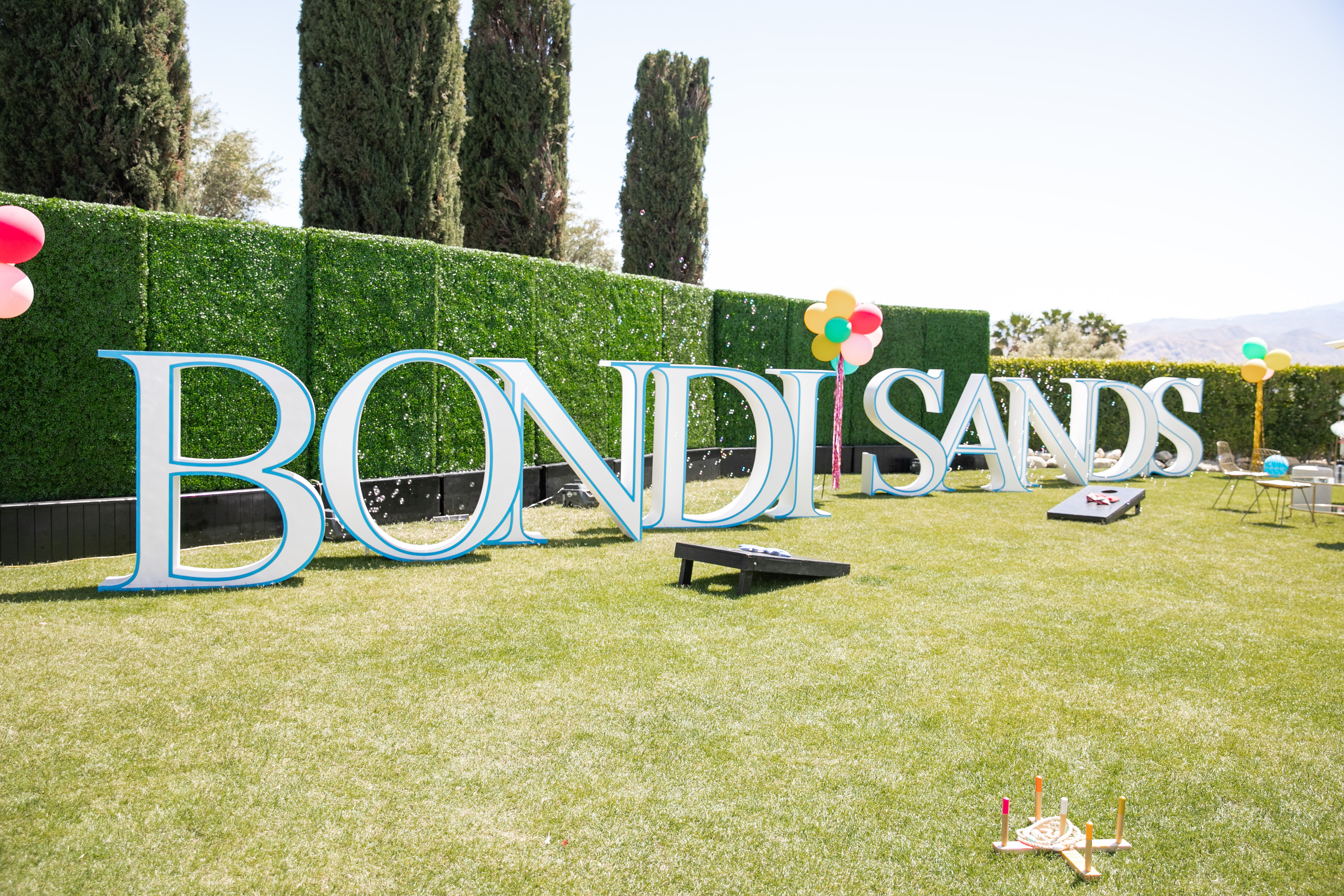
Bondi Sands at the Coachella in 2019

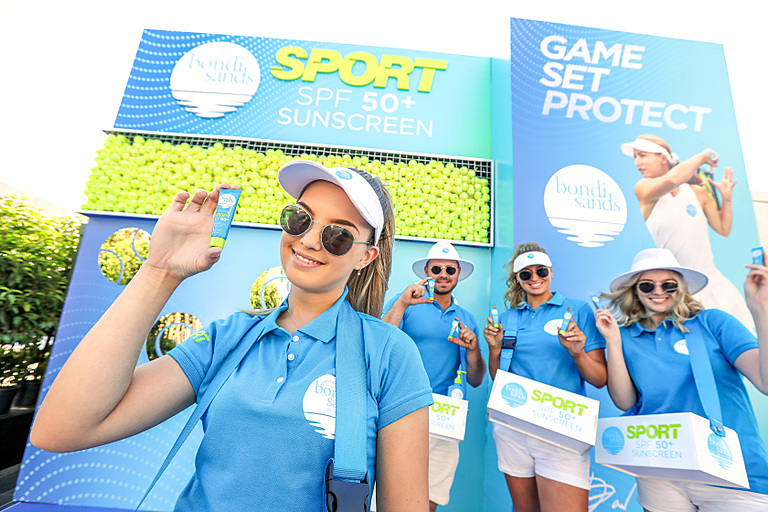
Bondi Sands at the Australian Open 2021

Bondi Sands is an Australian self tanning brand. The brand specialises in self tanners, suncare, skincare, and cosmetics. The business was established in 2012 and operates in Oceania as well as the US, UK and Europe.

Bondi Sands products are stocked in over 30,000 retail stores worldwide.

== History ==
The Bondi Sands brand was created in 2012 in Melbourne, Australia by Shaun Wilson and Blair James. The brand is named after Australia's famous Bondi Beach.

In 2012, the founders offered their products to the retailer Priceline. The chain agreed to sell three Bondi Sands products. As of 2021, Bondi Sands holds 60 percent of the market share in Australia.

In 2013, Bondi Sands launched in New Zealand. The brand's products appeared in Green Cross Health, Farmers and Countdown.

Bondi Sands entered the British market in 2015. The company started distributing through British retailers Superdrug and Boots. In 2018, Bondi Sands launched in Ireland and the Netherlands. In the same year, the company became one of the largest Australian owned beauty brand exporters.

The brand soon distributed through American retailer, Walgreens, and began selling in pharmacy stores on January 1, 2019. During the year, Bondi Sands products were available in over 7,700 Walgreens stores, the largest launch of an Australian beauty brand in the United States. The company also distributes through other American beauty stores such as Ulta Beauty, Target, CVS and Rite Aid.

In 2019, Bondi Sands appeared in Norway and Germany.

Bondi Sands started its expansion into the Canadian market in 2020.

The brand opened on Chinese Tmall in 2021. At the same time, Bondi Sands products appeared on Chinese e-commerce platforms including Little Red Book and TaoBao. In 2021, the brand released the first sustainable line called Pure. All products in the line are packaged in ethically sourced, 100% recyclable packaging. The company has also started cooperating with Australian charity Take 3 for the Sea. During World Earth Month, Bondi Sands donated $25,000 to Take 3 for the Sea.

In the same year, the brand signed a three-year deal with the Australian Open and became the Official Sunscreen Partner, promoting their range of Sport SPF 50+ Sunscreen products. Bondi Sands was also a partner in all events of the Summer Series 2021.

In August 2023, Bondi Sands was acquired by Kao Corporation, a Japanese chemical and cosmetics company.

== Product range ==
Bondi Sands has a range of 56 products in the following categories:

- Self Tanning
- Self Tanning Accessories
- Suncare
- Skincare
- Professional Salon Solutions
- Cosmetics

The company's products are manufactured across three facilities in Melbourne. Bondi Sands has offices in Melbourne, Los Angeles and London.

Bondi Sands products are vegan, cruelty free and Peta certified. The company is committed to sustainable practices, where by 2025 all packaging will be fully recyclable and contain recyclable materials.

== Brand ambassadors ==
Bondi Sands operates a global ambassador program involving Kylie Jenner, James Charles, Tammy Hembrow, Carli Bybel, Natalie Halcro, Charlotte Crosby, Holly Hagan, Gary Beadle, Megan McKenna and Michael Finch promoting the range. The latest ambassador for Bondi Sands is Miss Universe 2012, model Olivia Culpo.

Throughout the Australian Open Bondi Sands has worked with tennis stars, where in 2021 Daria Gavrilova was their official brand ambassador, and in 2022 former Tennis World Champion Lleyton Hewitt and his son, Cruz Hewitt partnered with the brand.

== Business model ==
Bondi Sands develops its Instagram and TikTok pages, collaborates with bloggers and influencers, and works on brand awareness. The company claims that it is trying to change the attitude to tanning and skin health.

== Coachella activation ==
Bondi Sands launched a new product in April 2019, Aero Aerated Self Tanning Foam. Thanks to its Coachella activation, the worldwide Aero product launch saw the brand break into the top ten skin care brands with $2.9million EMV. It saw a 234% increase in month-over-month growth.

The Coachella activation was supported by Australian, UK and US influencers who attended the Aero launch party. After the party, Aero became the best-selling product in Walgreens.

Bondi Sands added a fifth product to the Aero range, Aero Ultra Dark in January 2020.
