= Gee, Your Hair Smells Terrific =

Shampoo

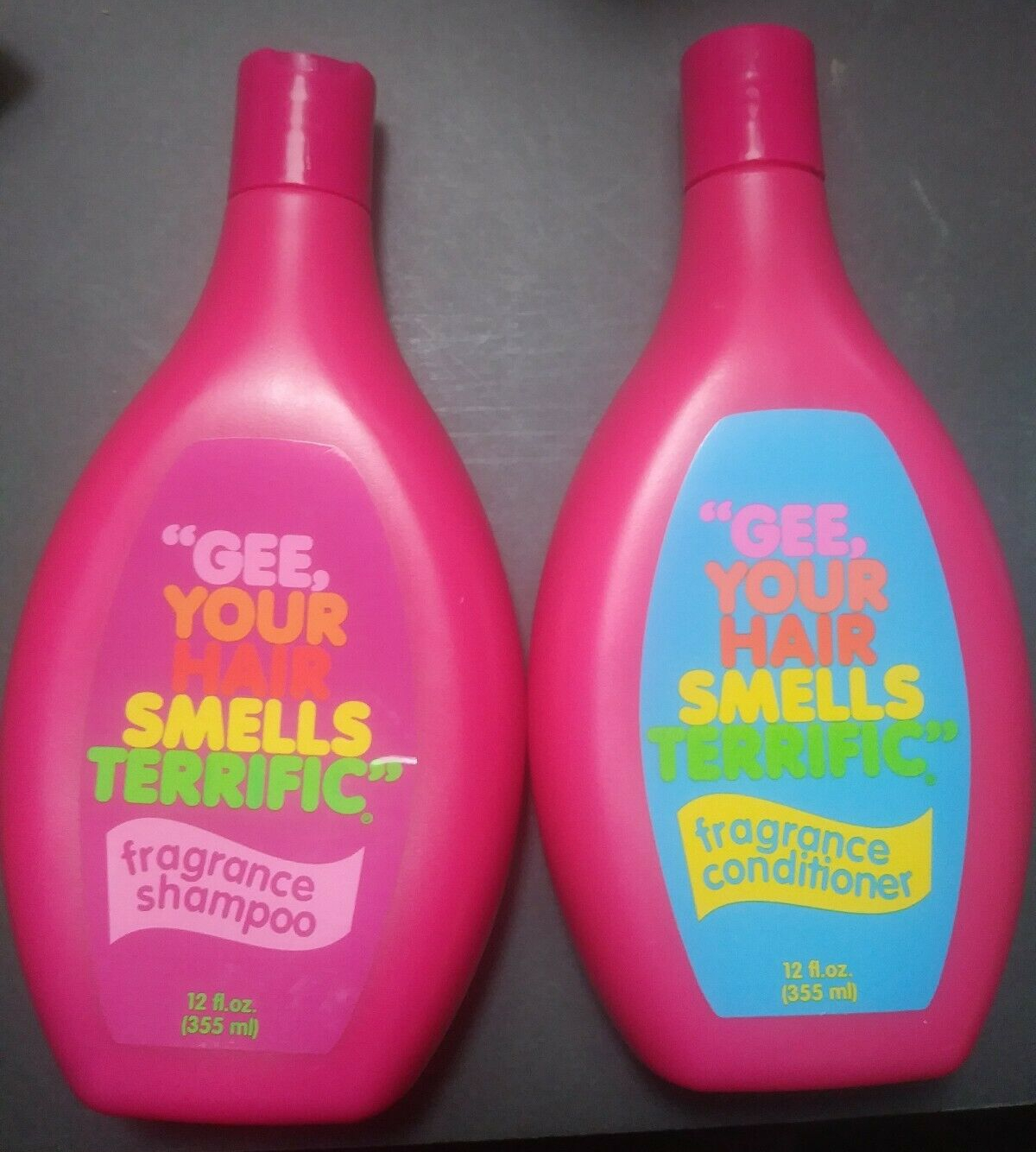
- Gee Your Hair Smells Terrific Shampoo
- Product type: Hair care
- Current owner: Andrew Jergens Company
- Country: United States
- Introduced: 1976
- Markets: United States; Philippines

Gee, Your Hair Smells Terrific was a popular fragrance shampoo manufactured by the Andrew Jergens Company from 1976 through the late 1980s. The shampoo is noted for its unusually pungent floral scent that softened after rinsing and remained fragrant in the user's hair for an extended period of time. The shampoo's unique aroma has been described as similar to a combination of chamomile, bubblegum and sage.

While out of production in the United States since the late 1980s, the formula was licensed to Vibelle Manufacturing Corporation of Malabon, Philippines and is currently sold in the Philippines, where it is still popular. In recent years, a reformulated "cruelty-free" version of the product (no longer containing musk oil as an ingredient) has been reintroduced in the USA by Vermont Country Store.

2011 publication Whatever Happened to Pudding Pops? refers to the product as the "crowning glory of the shampoo aisle", praising its "pop-art packaging" and claiming it "smelled of the '70s".

== In pop culture ==
The product's unusually long name was satirized on The Simpsons. In one episode, Patty Bouvier waxes her upper lip using a product called "Gee, Your Lip Looks Hairless," and in another episode, a sports venue on the show had been named "The Gee Your Hair Smells Terrific Arena."

It was also mentioned in the season 4 Boy Meets World episode "Fishing for Virna"; when Shawn and his father, Chet, babysit Frankie's little brother Herman, the latter steals the Hunters' bottle of shampoo, for which he is later made to return it and apologize. After Herman does so, an astounded Chet exclaims, "All the valuable things we have in this trailer, and you steal our shampoo?! What kind of weird little thief are you?"

In the 2004 episode of the comedy TV show Will & Grace, Will & Grace & Vince & Nadine (season 7, episode 7), Karen Walker mentions that she has bought Grace a bottle of Gee, Your Hair Smells Terrific.

== See also ==
- Hairstyles in the 1970s
