= Conde McGinley =

American publisher (1890–1963)

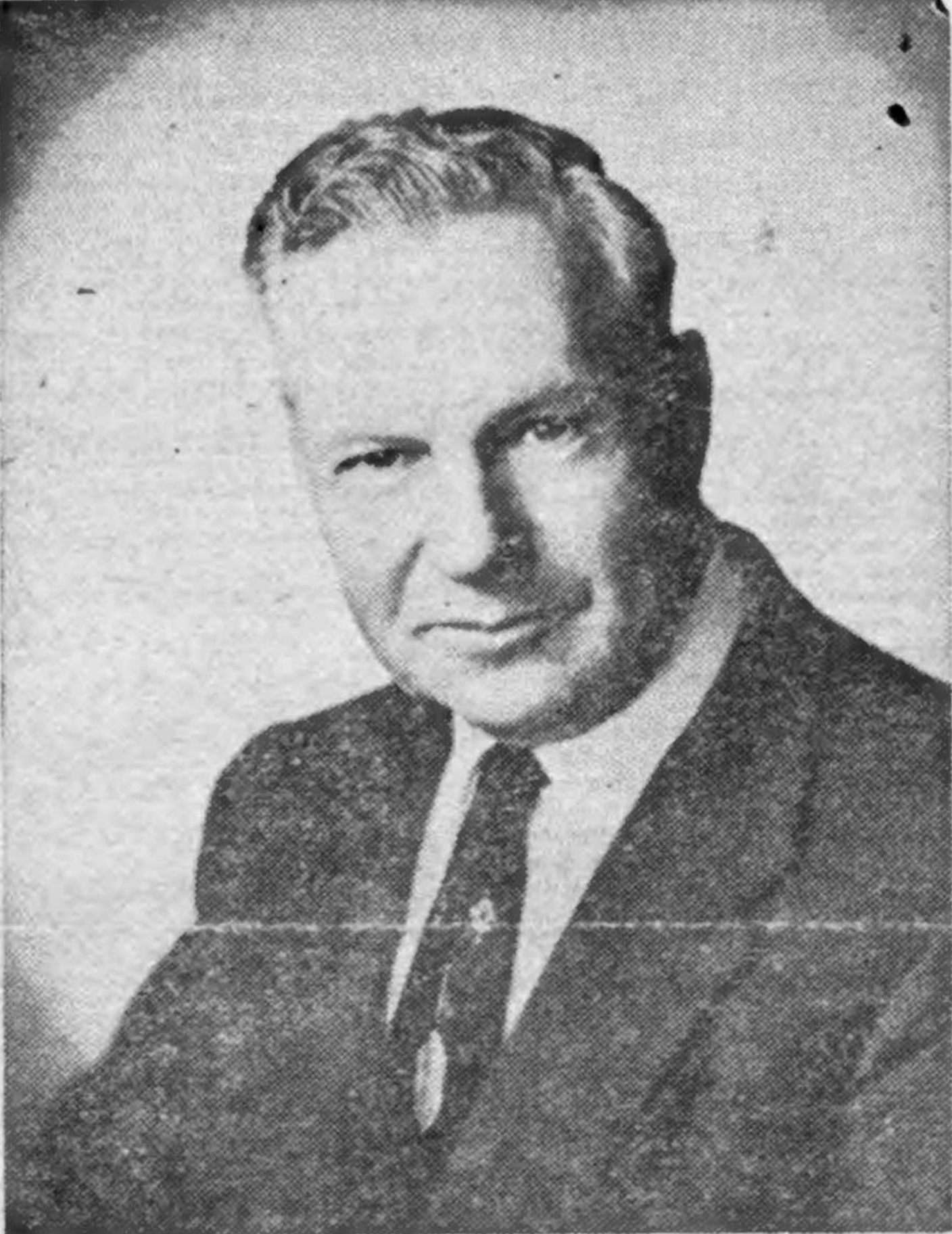
- This image of McGinley was published in the final, 15 May 1972 issue of Common Sense.
- Born: October 13, 1890; Norman, Oklahoma, U.S.
- Died: July 2, 1963 (aged 72); Union, New Jersey, U.S.
- Notable work: Common Sense
- Children: 3

Conde McGinley (October 13, 1890 – July 2, 1963) was an American publisher. From 1948 until his death in 1963, he was the editor and publisher of the semi-monthly newspaper Common Sense which reached a paid circulation of more than 100,000 by the mid-1950s. Initially anti-Communist in orientation, the newspaper later developed also into a pro-Nazi and antisemitic broadsheet.

McGinley gained attention due to his campaign against the nomination of Anna M. Rosenberg as assistant secretary of Defense in the administration of President Harry S. Truman. This campaign led to an investigation by the House Un-American Activities Committee.

== Early life ==
Conde McGinley was born in Norman, Oklahoma, on October 13, 1890, the eldest of three surviving children of Irish Catholic immigrant Connell B. McGinley (1852 – 1941) and his wife, Catherine. McGinley preferred to be known by his middle name Conde. He married Celia Brown around 1918. Around this time he claimed that he was "Secretary of the Grady County Highway Association" in Chickasha, Oklahoma. He moved with his parents to the Dallas, Texas, area, where his daughter Nona was born in 1927, and where his father died in 1941.

He was Catholic.

== Career ==
McGinley moved to New Jersey in 1929, opening a chain of restaurants along the shore. During World War II, he worked as an inspector in a defense plant.

=== Common Sense ===
The April 1958 issue of Common Sense

In 1946, he began editing a weekly paper in Newark, New Jersey, called variously Think, The Think and Think Weekly. By June 1947, it was issued as Common Sense. In November 1947, the headquarters were transferred to Union Township, Union County, New Jersey. The paper became semi-monthly in 1948.

Although the first issues were anti-Communist, it later developed into a mostly antisemitic broadsheet, produced by himself, with his son and daughter-in-law. Around 1948, he sued America magazine and others (including Walter Winchell) for libel, and the case dragged on for about seven years.

=== House Un-American Activities Committee ===
At the confirmation hearings for Anna Rosenberg, McGinley and others associated with him were prominently figured, including Benjamin H. Freedman, who had partially financed Common Sense. The fallout of this dispute brought him into the sights of House Un-American Activities Committee, which issued a 1954 report condemning his propaganda.

In response, "Conde McGinley of Common Sense urged the committee to hold a public hearing and 'if we cannot prove our statements we'll be very willing to cease publication'."

=== Christian Education Association ===
In 1954, McGinley formed the Christian Education Association with himself as president, his son as secretary/treasurer and Alex Jefimow as vice-president. The operation was at 530 Chestnut Street in Union, a building owned by Katherine Lettig, who was also a volunteer for the paper. The group also operated the Union Patriotic Press, whose officers were Charles Kane, John J. Reynolds and Edward J. Byrne.

In 1955, he was sued for $250,000 in punitive damages, for libel, by Rabbi Joachim Prinz (1902-1988) in Superior Court in Newark, New Jersey. McGinley had published in Common Sense that Prinz was "expelled in 1937 from Germany for revolutionary communistic activities". Prinz denied this. McGinley was defended by three attorneys, including Albert Dilling, former husband of Elizabeth Dilling Stokes, and their son, Kirkpatrick Dilling. The jury awarded Prinz $30,000, agreeing that "the bi-weekly publication was lying when it characterized him as a 'Red Rabbi'". A motion for a retrial was declined.

== Death ==
McGinley died of cancer on July 2, 1963, at his home in Union, New Jersey, aged 72. He was survived by his wife, two sons, and two daughters. Common Sense became defunct in May 1972. The last issue contained a statement by the editors that they considered the situation and the government beyond saving.
