= Kao Corporation =

Japanese chemicals and cosmetics company

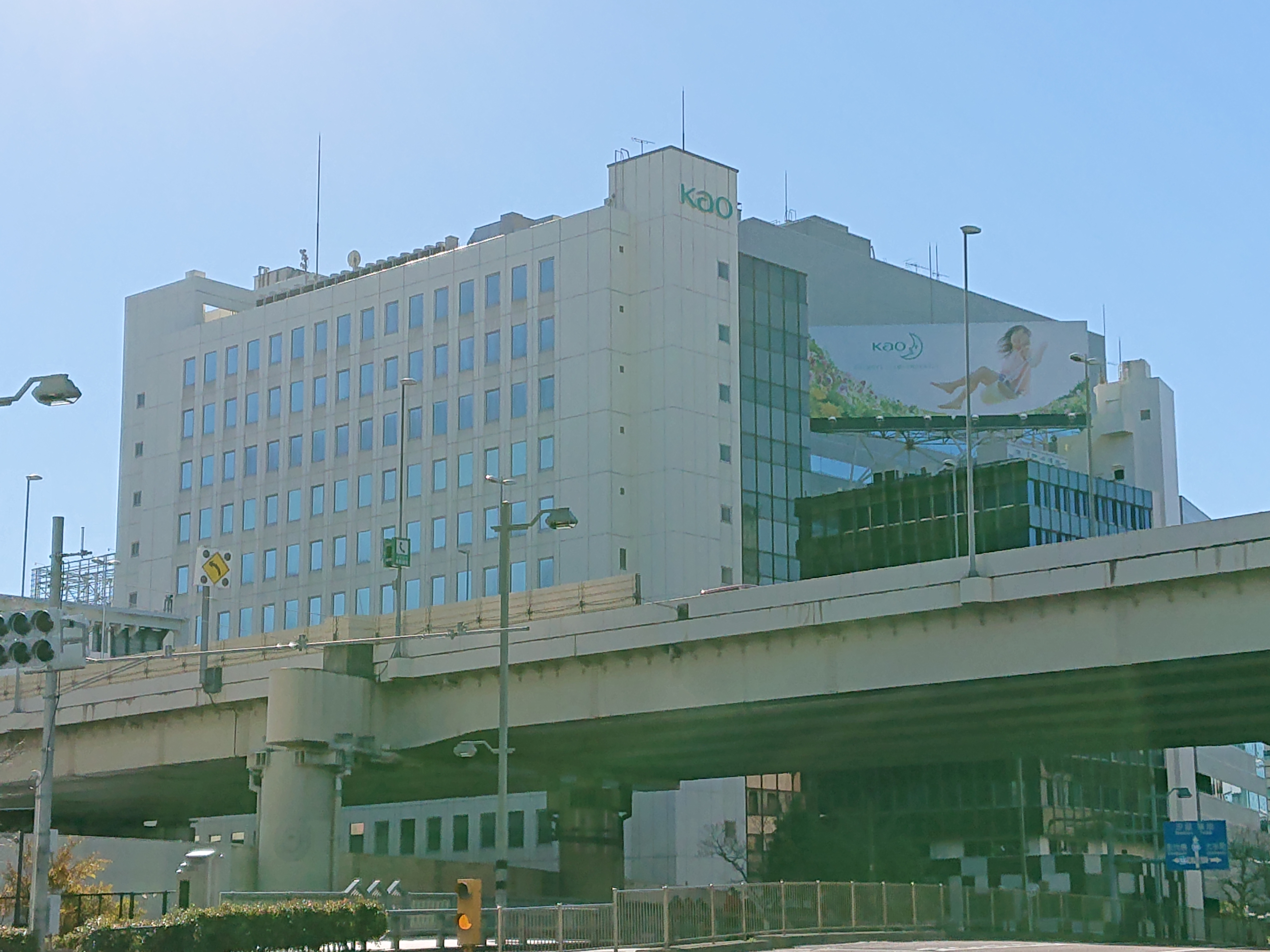
- Kao headquarters in Tokyo, Japan
- Native name: 花王株式会社
- Romanized name: Kaō Kabushiki-gaisha
- Type: Public (K.K)
- Traded as: TYO: 4452; TOPIX Large 70 Component
- Industry: Personal care, Cosmetics
- Founded: June 1882; 144 years ago Nihonbashi-Bakurocho, Tokyo, Japan
- Founder: Tomiro Nagase
- Headquarters: 14-10, Nihonbashi-Kayabacho Itchome, Chūō, Tokyo, Japan
- Revenue: ▼¥1,381,997 million (2020)
- Operating income: ▼¥175,563 million (2020)
- Net income: ▼¥128,067 million (2020)
- Total assets: ▲¥1,665,616 million (2020)
- Total equity: ▲¥938,194 million (2020)
- Number of employees: 33,409 (consolidated) (2020)
- Website: www.kao.com

Kao Corporation (花王株式会社, Kaō Kabushiki-gaisha) is a Japanese global chemical and cosmetics company headquartered in Nihonbashi-Kayabacho, Chūō, Tokyo, Japan.

== History ==
Kao was established in 1882 by Tomiro Nagase as a manufacturer of domestic toiletry soap. Until 1954, they were known as Kao Soap Company (花王石鹸株式会社), and finally in 1985 to Kao Corporation.

1960s and 1970s
During the 1960s and the 1970s, the company expanded to Taiwan and ASEAN countries, and also to oleochemicals in order to complement their main business. During this time, the company launched household products, laundry products, and industrial products to expand its revenue base (such as New Beads detergent, Humming fabric softener, Haiter bleach and Magiclean household cleaners).
1980s
During the 1980s, its products Merries diapers, Attack detergent, Bioré daily skincare and Bioré U daily body care, Curel (1986) and Sofina cosmetics were launched. During this time, Kao engaged in several joint ventures (haircare in Europe, Nivea in Japan with Beiersdorf), and acquisitions (Andrew Jergens Company in 1988, Goldwell AG in 1989) in North America and Europe. During this period, Kao also expanded to the manufacture of floppy disks.
1990s and 2000s
During the 1990s and 2000s, the company expanded into China and Vietnam—countries that, during that time, were opening up their economies to the rest of the world. Also, the company expanded into food products with Econa and Healthya. Additionally, the company made floppy disks and optical discs during this time. It created the electrostatic cleaning market in 1995 with the release of its Quickle Wiper products, which it licensed to S. C. Johnson & Son under the Pledge Grab-It brand in Europe and the US. It also continued to acquire businesses (John Frieda in 2002, Molton Brown in 2005 and Kanebo Cosmetics in 2006).

In 2020, Kao Corporation was ranked the No. 4 out of 42 companies in the Corporate Knights Industry Group's Personal Care and Cleaning Products category, recognized for its excellence in innovation capacity, employee retention as well as clean revenue, or revenue from all goods and services which have clear environmental benefits. For the company's national and international experience in sustainable development, and eco-friendly products, the Environment Possibility Award conferred the "Environmental Heroes of the Year" to Kao Corporation in 2020.

In 2021 two of Kao's products, the 3D Space Shampoo Sheet and the Space Laundry Sheet, were chosen to be sent to the International Space Station, with the Japan Aerospace Exploration Agency (JAXA) in 2022.

== Brand ownership ==
- Attack
- Ban
- Bondi Sands
- Bioré
- Biozet
- Curel
- Goldwell
- Guhl
- Healthya
- Jergens
- John Frieda
- Kanebo
- Kate
- KMS
- Laurier owned by Glaxo Wellcome
- Liese owned by SmithKline Beecham
- Magiclean
- MegRhythm
- Merries
- Merit
- Molton Brown
- Oribe
- Segreta
- Sensai
- Sofina
- Success
