= Andrew Jergens Company =

American personal care company

- Founded: 1882 in Cincinnati, Ohio, U.S.
- Headquarters: Cincinnati
- Products: Personal care products
- Owner: Kao Corporation
- Website: www.jergens.com/en-au/

The Andrew Jergens Company (formerly the Jergens Soap Company) is an American skin and hair care product company founded in Cincinnati, Ohio, in 1882. Currently owned by the Kao Corporation, Jergens is associated with various historically significant products including a cherry-almond hand lotion; a Natural Glow tanning lotion; and 1976 shampoo Gee, Your Hair Smells Terrific.

== History ==
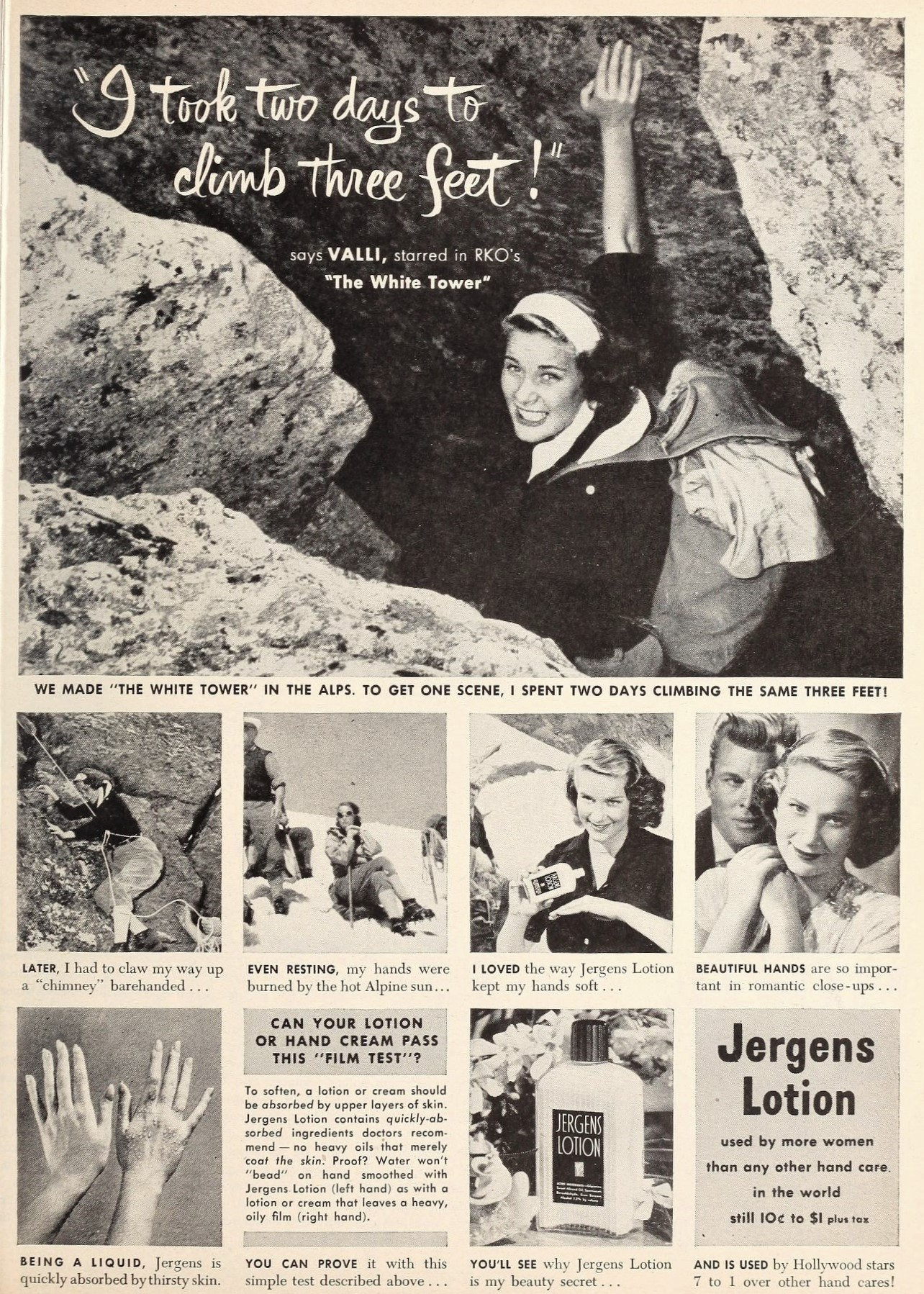
1950 ad for Jergens Lotion in Modern Screen

Andrew Jergens Sr. and Charles H. Geifus founded the Andrew Jergens Company in 1882. The first product was a coconut soap. Their 1901 cherry-almond lotion, presently known as Jergens Original Scent, became the best-selling hand lotion in America.

Circa 1925, the Andrew Jergens Company operated a soap factory at 99 W. Verdugo Avenue in Burbank, California, at the intersection of Verdugo Avenue and the Southern Pacific Railroad tracks. However, this California plant closed in October 1992, moving production back to their headquarters in Ohio.

American Brands, Inc. bought the company in 1970, ending the Jergen family's connection to the brand.

From 1976 into the 1980s, Jergens Soap Company produced fragrance shampoo Gee, Your Hair Smells Terrific, which has been called the "crowning glory of the shampoo aisle" during the 1970s.

The Kao Corporation acquired the company in 1988.

In 2005, they faced additional success with a Natural Glow self-tanning lotion. After the product appeared on a Kelly Ripa's talk show Live with Regis and Kelly, internet chat rooms, and in eBay auctions, the product sold out and the Jergens Web site featured a waiting list of 38,000. Senior brand manager Brian Rudie told The New York Times that the factory went into overdrive, stating: "We didn't count on the buzz. Natural Glow gave us double the sales of our closest competitor."
