= Common Sense (newspaper) =

American newspaper

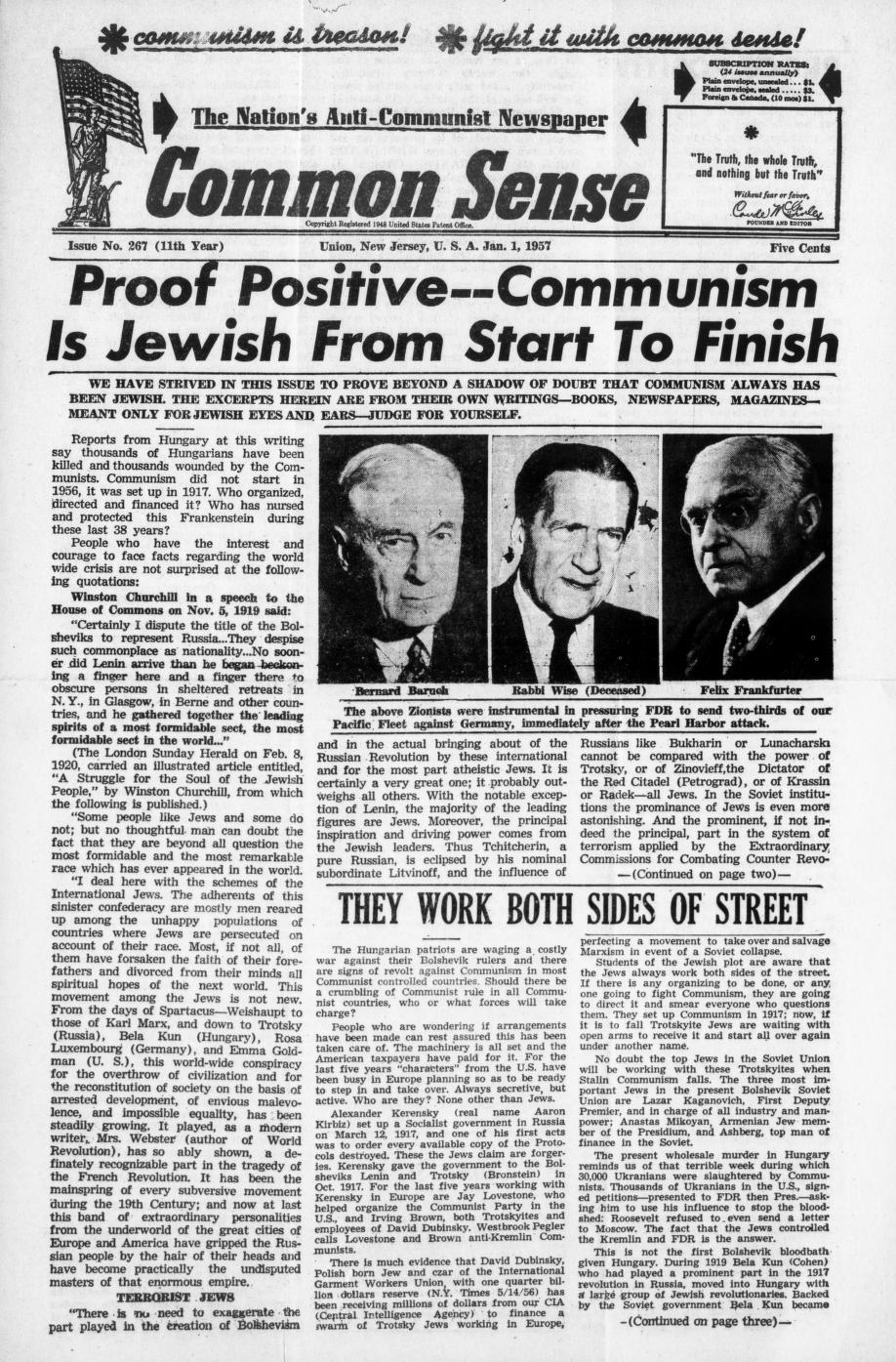
- First page of the 267th issue, January 1, 1957
- Type: Semimonthly newspaper
- Owner: Christian Education Association
- Founder: Conde McGinley
- Founded: 1946
- Ceased publication: May 1972
- Political alignment: Far-right
- Language: English
- City: Union, New Jersey
- Country: United States
- Circulation: 91,000 (as of 1962)
- ISSN: 0010-3306
- OCLC number: 1564417

Common Sense, formerly Think Weekly, was an American far-right semimonthly newspaper that ran from 1946 until 1972. Initially anti-communist in orientation, it later developed an aggressively antisemitic ideology. It was founded and edited by Conde McGinley; it was published by his Christian Education Association in Union, New Jersey.

Initially focusing solely on anticommunism, the paper soon embraced explicit antisemitism, printing articles from an array of Nazi sympathizers. It has been characterized by scholars as far-right. The paper was disavowed by the House Un-American Activities Committee in the 1950s for its antisemitism. Following McGinley's death, it professed to abandon left- and right- political distinctions; towards the end of the paper's life, it shifted to an ideology based on Francis Parker Yockey and began to praise Joseph Stalin for his antisemitism. The paper also attacked Catholicism, black people, and water fluoridation, among other causes.

The paper was established in 1946 in Newark, New Jersey, by McGinley as Think, later The Think and then Think Weekly. In 1947, its title was changed to Common Sense and it relocated to Union. After McGinley's death in 1963, he was succeeded by his son, Conde McGinley Jr., who sold the paper to four others, including some far-right activists. In 1972, considering the political situation hopeless, the owners shuttered the paper. At its height in the early 1960s, it had a circulation of over 90,000. It influenced many figures of the far right in its day, but following its closure sank into obscurity.

== History ==
Common Sense was established in 1946 by Conde McGinley. McGinley was born in 1890, the son of an Irish immigrant father. Prior to establishing Common Sense, he worked a variety of careers, including working at a war plant and operating a roadside stand. He was Catholic.

The paper was founded as Think, then was shortly after renamed The Think, then Think Weekly. The Think version of the paper was published in Newark, New Jersey, as a weekly paper. The paper was initially obscure with low print runs. After McGinley befriended Benjamin H. Freedman, an antisemitic, pro-Arab Jewish convert to Catholicism and wealthy businessman, Freedman decided to back Common Sense financially, and the paper became more successful. The paper's name was changed to Common Sense on June 29, 1947. It moved headquarters to Union, New Jersey, and became a semimonthly the next year.

In the 1950s, Common Sense, and McGinley, falsely accused Anna Rosenberg of having communist credentials as she was appointed to a position in the Department of Defense. Due to the aggressive antisemitism of the paper, McGinley was investigated by the House Un-American Activities Committee (HUAC), who condemned him and the paper. They described the paper as a "clearing house for hate propagandists" and as antisemitic.

In 1955, McGinley was sued by the Rabbi Joachim Prinz in the Superior Court of Newark over an article in Common Sense. McGinley had published that Prinz was "expelled in 1937 from Germany for revolutionary communistic activities". Prinz denied this. The jury awarded Prinz $30,000, agreeing that "[Common Sense] was lying when it characterized him as a 'Red Rabbi'".

In 1963, McGinley died from cancer aged 73. He was succeeded as publisher by his son, Conde McGinley Jr., who for several years had published the paper with him. McGinley Jr. later sold the paper to four people: Hannah Cummings, K. Littig, Robert Olney, and Pedro del Valle. Olney was an associate of the Nazi sympathizer Elizabeth Dilling, while del Valle was a fascist, a former proponent of Mussolini. Circulation fell greatly after McGinley's death; from its height of 90,000, it fell to about 50,000 by 1967 and 30,000 by the 1970s.

It ceased publication in May 1972. The last issue contained a statement by the editors that they considered the situation and the government beyond saving. In this same issue, the paper listed five recommended periodicals that in the view of the Common Sense publisher were sound in terms of business and told "the basic truth”, for its readers to go to instead: The American Mercury and the Washington Observer (both published by Willis Carto), The Councilor (published by Ned Touchstone), The Thunderbolt (published by the National States' Rights Party), and White Power (published by the American Nazi Party).

== Contents and profile ==
In format, Common Sense was a four page paper. After moving to Union, New Jersey, the paper was based in McGinley's 14-room house at 530 Chestnut Street. Common Sense was published semimonthly by the Christian Education Association (CEA). In managing the CEA, McGinley worked closely with his son, Conde McGinley Jr. The CEA published other materials, including books, records, and pamphlets, but was otherwise obscure; the paper was much better known than the parent organization. The CEA also issued a single-issue publication propounding a Communist-Jew conspiracy, written by McGinley, probably in the 1950s, entitled "The Coming Red Dictatorship". This was circulated extensively, more than the individual Common Sense issues. HUAC charged that there were ties between the CEA and the neo-fascist National Renaissance Party; the paper regularly used the NRP's materials.

McGinley edited the paper. Many Nazi sympathizers published in the newspaper, "a slew of antisemitic, pro-Nazi, and neofascist guest writers". Contributors included Eustace Mullins, George Van Horn Moseley, Lyrl Clark Van Hyning, Charles B. Hudson, Elizabeth Dilling, Dan Smoot, Pedro del Valle, Kenneth Goff, Robert Williams, Merwin K. Hart, Upton Close, Benjamin H. Freedman, Edwin Walker, Merwin K. Hart, Eugene N. Sanctuary, John Sullivan, Fred Farrel and Dari F. Lyons. Another mainstay writer was Standish Hall, a black woman who was an avowed antisemite. The paper also promoted the works of Mullins, including his book, The Federal Reserve Conspiracy.

The paper's circulation was 7,000 in 1947, over 20,000 in 1956, 84,000 in October 1960, 89,500 in October 1961, 91,000 in 1962, 82,000 in 1964, 52,000 in 1967, and 27,000 in 1972.

== Ideology and politics ==
I am an American citizen and view with alarm the condition of our once free Republic. I might say that I am afraid of our future. I am not afraid of Kosygin or the Russian people. I am not afraid of Red China or of Tito or any other Communist leader in the world. I am afraid of what my President, my Senators and Supreme Court Justices are doing to my country .... Your enemy is in Washington and you had better know that!

— Common Sense, October 15, 1967, no. 503, p. 4:

While Common Sense started out exclusively focused on anti-communism, it soon shifted its focus to explicit antisemitism. Thomas M. Konda wrote that "virtually every article expounded on the Jewish conspiracy". John George and Laird Wilcox classified it as "right-extremist", while historian Stephen E. Atkins described it as "radical right". It pointed to the debunked Protocols of the Elders of Zion as proof of a Jewish plot and claimed Jews caused the Russian Revolution; in response to the HUAC report calling him antisemitic, McGinley said "all revolutionary movements originated in the minds of Jews and Communism is nothing but a front for the Jews". In some issues of the paper, every name of a Jewish person was identified with a star of David next to it. Political writer George Thayer described it as "racist" and full of conspiracy theories, "devoted almost entirely to attacks against Jews"; he said that its influence grew from McGinley's "adept advocacy of the 'worldwide conspiracy' theme, a cornerstone of racist thought."

With a consistent focus on "Jewish international bankers", a specific target of the paper was the Rothschild family, which the paper portrayed as behind all the world's problems through abuse of their supposedly immense political power; it wrote in one 1970 issue that they "have financed both sides of every war. They have murdered 106,000,000 of God's humans in the 20th century alone." Journalist Richard Dudman wrote that: "McGinley's simple approach is to identify every person in public affairs who is a Jew, has a 'Jewish name' or 'looks Jewish' and prove thereby that the Jews are taking over the country through evil devices like the United Nations, disarmament, and the National Association for the Advancement of Colored People."

The paper later expanded to criticizing the civil rights movement and attacking black people, though its focus on antisemitism was maintained. It claimed the NAACP was controlled by Zionists. A 1971 issue praised the Ku Klux Klan. Despite the fact that McGinley himself was Catholic, under his leadership the paper was also known for attacking Catholicism. In addition to its antisemitic, racial, and religious attacks, the paper also at various times attacked racial integration, gun laws, oral contraceptives, water fluoridation, Harvard University, various American federal government agencies, taxes, and the United Nations. It sympathized with the Nazi government. It also praised a black preacher, C. C. Addison of the African Universal Church. Common Sense complimented the far-right John Birch Society (JBS); however, Robert W. Welch Jr., the cofounder of the JBS, criticized it for its antisemitism, saying that McGinley "otherwise would have become and remained a tremendous force in the fight against Communism".

Following McGinley's death, the editorial content stayed similar, and the intensity of its antisemitism was maintained. Laird and Wilcox noted that "its racism and anti-Semitism continued to be quite pronounced, even obsessive." Despite its initial anti-communist bent, later on the paper came to claim that not all communism was the same; while Trotskyism represented "Jewish interests", Stalinism was positive as it represented a "primordial Russian nationalism". After Joseph Stalin's purges of Jews and the Prague trials, the paper praised Soviet Russia for its antisemitism, and praised Stalin for his antisemitic actions.

In the 1970s, it began to adopt a Third Positionist stance, claiming to disavow both the left and right wings, in favor of taking the position of the "Third Man" who would destroy both. One article wrote that "Right Wing and Left Wing alike are mere puppets of the Jews"; another article wrote that the true enemy was the American government, not the Russian Communists. Soon after, it adopted the ideology of Francis Parker Yockey, who wrote on similar ideas, and began to promote him and his work. It also began explicitly praising Adolf Hitler. One article by Farrell from this time said: "There is really only one battle to be fought: THE BATTLE AGAINST THE JEWS."

== Legacy ==
In its day, the paper had a wide ranging influence and was read by broad swathes of the far-right; while the paper was ongoing, George Thayer noted it as the racist paper with the largest circulation. Historian Stephen E. Atkins described it as "the forum for most of the extremists of the far right in the United States during the 1950s and 1960s", while Laird and Wilcox described it as "the 'Sacred Cow' of the anti-Semitic right". Laird and Wilcox noted it as especially significant due to its influence on right-wingers who were not explicitly antisemitic, writing that "the significance of 'Common Sense' lies in the fact that it was read by many rightists belonging to groups whose ideology was never racist nor anti-Semitic". Eustace Mullins, an influential antisemitic writer, began his writing career with Common Sense.

It was very influential on numerous white supremacist activists. Thayer noted its "considerable influence on the careers of a number of racists". It set George Lincoln Rockwell, one of the most influential white supremacists in America and the founder of the American Nazi Party, on the path to becoming a neo-Nazi, after he was given the paper to read by an associate. It also influenced John Patler, a member of the American Nazi Party who eventually murdered Rockwell. White supremacist navy admiral John G. Crommelin was impressed by the paper, and invested in the CEA. It also influenced a vice-chairman of the white supremacist National States' Rights Party, Ann Bishop, who said that it "educated [her] on the Jews".

Despite this contemporary influence, Laird and Wilcox said that, by the 1990s, like most other periodicals like it, Common Sense had "passed into history accomplishing essentially nothing. Few among the current crop of extreme rightists recognize the name and almost no one under age forty has seen a copy. Printed on cheap newsprint, what few copies exist will be dust before long. The efforts of its editors and publishers, as well as those of its opponents and targeted groups, will have been for naught. It fell under its own weight needing no help from anyone." They wrote that Common Sense "died as it had lived".
