= Molton Brown =

British personal care company

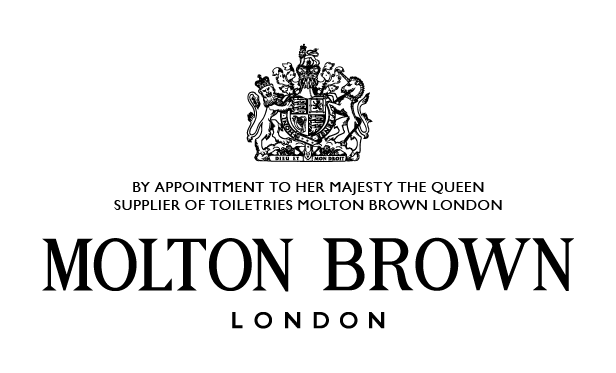

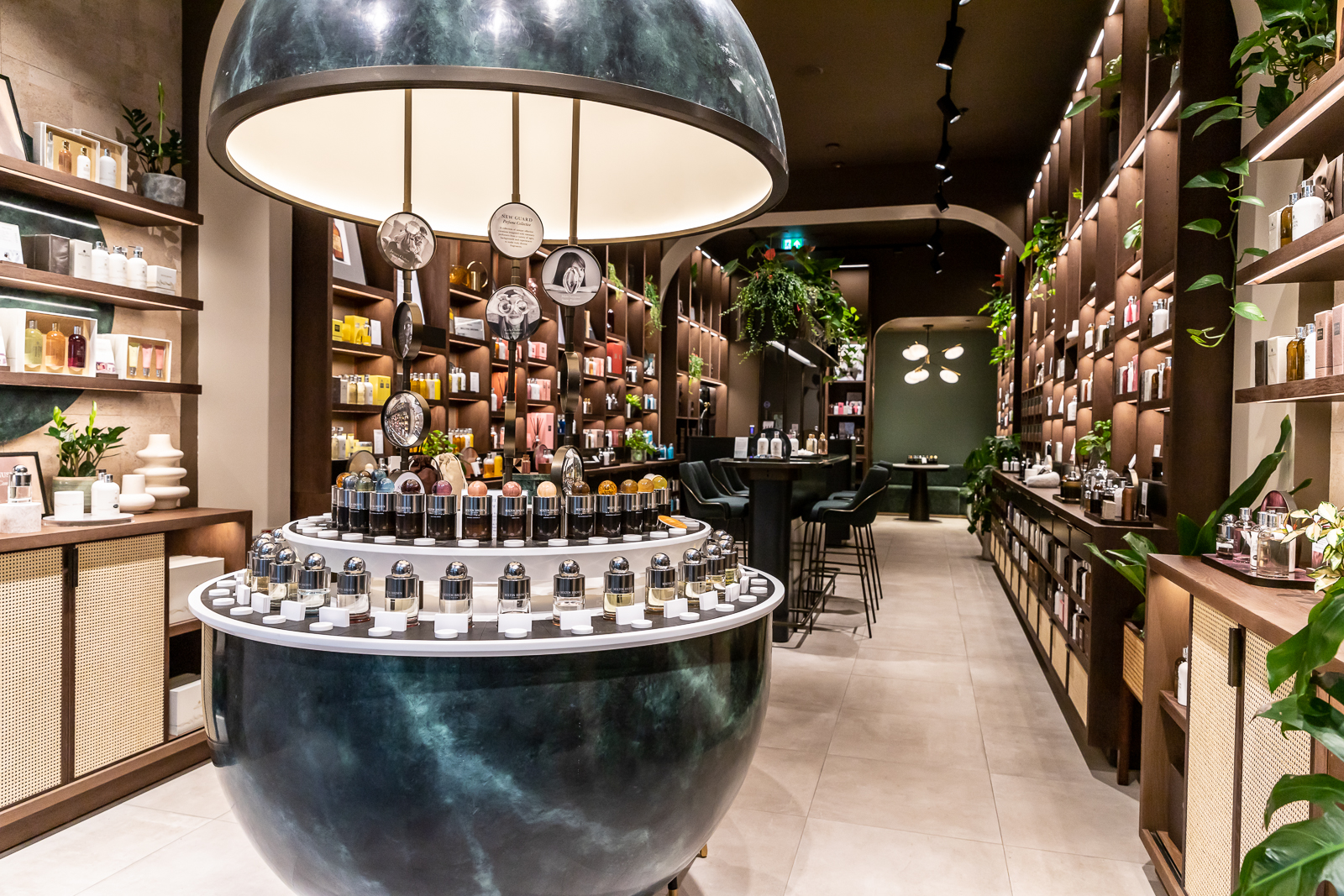
- Bluewater store, February 2020
- Company type: Subsidiary
- Industry: Retail
- Founded: 1971; 55 years ago
- Products: Toiletries
- Parent: Kao Corporation
- Website: www.moltonbrown.com

Molton Brown is a British fragrance brand founded in 1971 by Caroline Burstein and Michael Collis. The brand was conferred with a Royal Warrant for the supply of toiletries by appointment of Queen Elizabeth II in 2012. The brand is a member of the Walpole body for promoting, protecting and developing British luxury.

== History ==
Molton Brown was founded in 1971 by Caroline Burstein and Michael Collis. The brand initially started as a hair salon and gained recognition for its exceptional reputation, attracting the attention of several notable public figures. It started out of one location at 58 South Molton Street in Mayfair, London, situated near the Browns fashion boutique owned by Burstein's parents. Molton Brown focused on developing natural hair care products and styling techniques such as finger-drying. The salon's in-house stylists, including Sam McKnight and Kerry Warn, later notably created covers for fashion magazines, including Vogue and Cosmopolitan. The brand also featured the then-unknown Kate Moss as an in-house model in the 1990s.

Burstein and Collis had personally hand-mixed the brand's products at the salon, before later moving production in 1984 to their country house, Motts Hall in Elsenham, Essex, England. The business continued to expand in the 1990s in partnership with hotel and travel providers and partnering with British Airways in 1996 in supplying the latter's in-flight amenities.

The Japanese Kao Corporation acquired Molton Brown for £170m in 2005.

In 2012, Molton Brown was conferred with a Royal Warrant for the supply of toiletries by appointment of Queen Elizabeth II.

== Sustainability ==
Molton Brown products have never been tested on animals. The brand has been cruelty-free since its founding, and they have created 100% vegetarian formulas. The brand's manufacturing facility is carbon neutral and has used 100% renewable electricity since 2016 and recycled 97% of its waste since 2021.

The brand's products have been Leaping Bunny-approved since 2012, a globally recognised standard for cruelty-free cosmetics and household products. The brand has also committed to sustainable initiatives, including refillable packaging, responsible manufacturing, and reduction of plastic.

== Awards ==
In February 2013 Molton Brown was awarded the BUAV Leaping Bunny stamp of approval by Cruelty Free International certifying all of the brand's products to be free from animal tests under the international Humane Standards.
