= Anna Rosenberg =

American public servant (1899–1983)

Anna M. Rosenberg
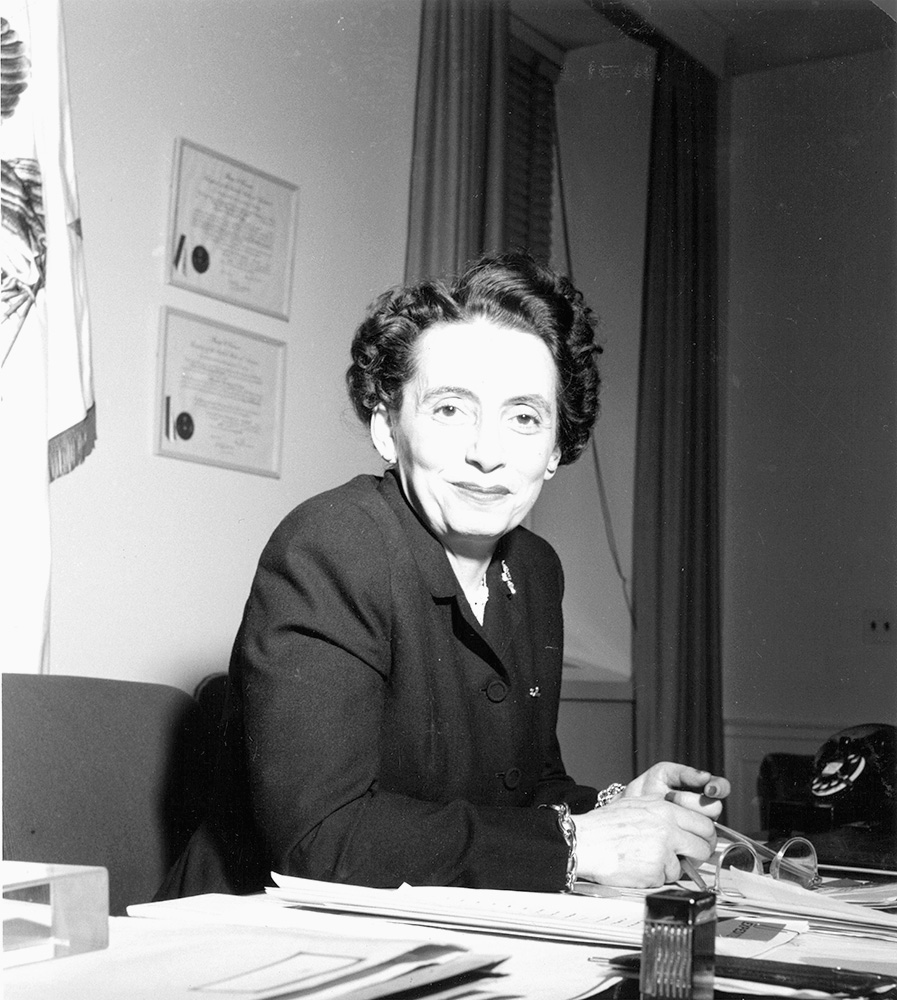
- Rosenberg in 1951

Assistant Secretary of Defense (Manpower and Personnel)
- In office November 15, 1950 – January 20, 1953
- President: Harry Truman
- Preceded by: Office established
- Succeeded by: John A. Hannah

Personal details
- Born: Anna Marie Lederer; July 19, 1899 Budapest, Hungary
- Died: May 9, 1983 (aged 83) New York City, New York, U.S.
- Spouses: Julius Rosenberg (m. 1919; div. 1962) Paul G. Hoffman (m. 1962; died 1974)
- Occupation: Government official, political consultant

Anna Marie Rosenberg (née Lederer; July 19, 1899 – May 9, 1983), later Anna Rosenberg Hoffman, was an American public official, advisor to four presidents, and businesswoman. During the early 1950s, she served as an Assistant Secretary of Defense, becoming the then-highest ranking woman in the history of the Department of Defense. Among the landmark initiatives she was involved in during her public service career were the GI Bill and the desegregation of the U.S. military. Upon her death, The New York Times called Rosenberg "one of the most influential women in the country's public affairs for a quarter of a century."

== Early life ==
Anna Marie Lederer was born on July 19, 1899, in Budapest, Hungary, the child of Albert Lederer and Charlotte (née Sarolta Bacskai) Lederer. She may have been born in either 1901 or 1902, but her father's naturalization petition indicates her birth date as July 19, 1899, which is corroborated by Ellis Island intake documents and other sources. She had one sibling, an older sister, Clare Lederer (later Clare von Arnold). In 1910, Albert immigrated from Hungary to New York City, followed by his wife and daughters in 1912. Anna attended Wadleigh High School for Girls. In 1917, Lederer became a naturalized U.S. citizen.

== Early career ==
Rosenberg became known as a labor mediator as early as high school, earning mention in the New York Times during a large student strike related to mandatory military training. By the early 1920s, she moved into political campaigns, and was mentored by Tammany Hall political figures and social activist Belle Moskowitz. Inspired by the older Moskowitz, Rosenberg opened a public- and labor relations firm while continuing to be involved in Democratic politics in New York City.

While working on Franklin D. Roosevelt's campaign for New York governor in 1928, she attracted the attention of Roosevelt's wife Eleanor, who would later describe Rosenberg as "a woman who penetrated [the] ‘old boy network’ through her ability, friendship with men of influence, and force of personality."

== Roosevelt administration ==
=== New Deal ===
When Franklin Roosevelt won the presidency in 1932, Rosenberg was considered for leadership positions to manage the large programs of Roosevelt's signature New Deal. In 1934, Nathan Straus Jr., New York State regional director of the National Recovery Administration (NRA), selected Rosenberg as his assistant. Rosenberg later succeeded him as regional director, becoming the only female regional director of the NRA.

After the United States Supreme Court declared the NRA unconstitutional in A.L.A. Schechter Poultry Corp. v. United States (1935), Rosenberg became New York State regional director of the Social Security Board — again the only woman. She served as a mediator for negotiations during the 1938 New York City truckers strike

Also in 1938, Roosevelt sent Rosenberg to Europe with a commission to study labor practices; it was the first of three missions to Europe she made for Roosevelt (the other two were during World War II). She served as regional director of the Social Security Board until 1943.

=== World War II ===
In the summer of 1941, President Roosevelt enlisted Rosenberg's help addressing the calls of civil rights activist A. Philip Randolph to end the systematic exclusion of Black Americans from the U.S. defense industry. Working with Randolph and New York City Mayor Fiorello La Guardia, Rosenberg helped formulate what would become Executive Order 8802 and its enforcement mechanism the Fair Employment Practice Committee (FEPC), which prohibited ethnic or racial discrimination in United States' defense industry. Historian Roger Daniels described E.O. 8802 and the FEPC as "the first federal action[s] against race discrimination since Reconstruction."

By 1941, Rosenberg was serving as New York regional director of the Social Security Board and War Power Commission and in the Office of Defense Health and Welfare Services, earning her the nickname "Seven-Job Anna."

From 1942 to 1945, Rosenberg served as New York State regional director of the War Manpower Commission. Concurrently, she served as a consultant to the Retraining and Reemployment Administration. While with the War Manpower Commission, Rosenberg developed the "Buffalo Plan," which solved multiple problems bedeviling wartime defense manufacturing. Her plan was rolled out nationwide. When he honored Rosenberg as the first-ever recipient of the Medal of Freedom in October 1945, President Harry S. Truman said that without the Buffalo Plan, the "necessary manpower for war production would not have been attained."

In August 1944, when President Franklin D. Roosevelt sent Rosenberg to Europe to report on the needs of American soldiers after their demobilization, she recommended education and supported the G.I. Bill of Rights. On a second wartime mission at FDR's request, Anna Rosenberg became one of the first Allied women to enter a liberated concentration camp, when she bore witness to the horrors of Nordhausen.

Throughout the war years, Rosenberg shared a close friendship with President Roosevelt, and sometimes "smuggled food in to him", which they would eat in his office. A Chicago newspaper called her "perhaps the closest person to FDR, with the exception of Harry Hopkins." Author Joseph Lelyveld claims that "Anna Rosenberg found her way onto [FDR's] appointments calendar more easily than most cabinet members."

== Truman administration ==
In late 1950, President Truman nominated Rosenberg to be Assistant Secretary of Defense for Manpower and Personnel. Senator Joseph McCarthy and his staff launched an all-out campaign to oppose her nomination due to alleged connections to the Communist Party, but she was recommended by the Senate Armed Services Committee.

Rosenberg's nomination was mired by accusations of Communist activities levied by anti-Communist firebrand Benjamin Freedman. After Rosenberg was nominated on November 9, Freedman mailed 25,000 copies of the antisemitic newspaper Common Sense, edited by Conde McGinley, to all the names in the Congressional directory. Freedman also provided purported claims from communists J. B. Matthews and Ralph De Sola that Rosenberg had been a member of a John Reed Club and was a Communist sympathizer, even charging that she had instructed de Sola's wife to plant Communist agents in New York City schools. On December 5, the Senate Armed Services Committee reopened its hearings into Rosenberg's appointment.

Between December 8 and 13, the Senate heard testimony from 10 witnesses, including Freedman. De Sola denied Freedman's claims about Rosenberg, and other charges were dismissed as unreliable hearsay or mistaken identities. Upon questioning, Freedman criticized "control of Zionists" over the media in New York. Members of the media criticized the Senate for conducting hearings into the charges from figures like Freedman.

In spite of opposition, on November 15, 1950, she was named Assistant Secretary of Defense, a post she held until January 1953.

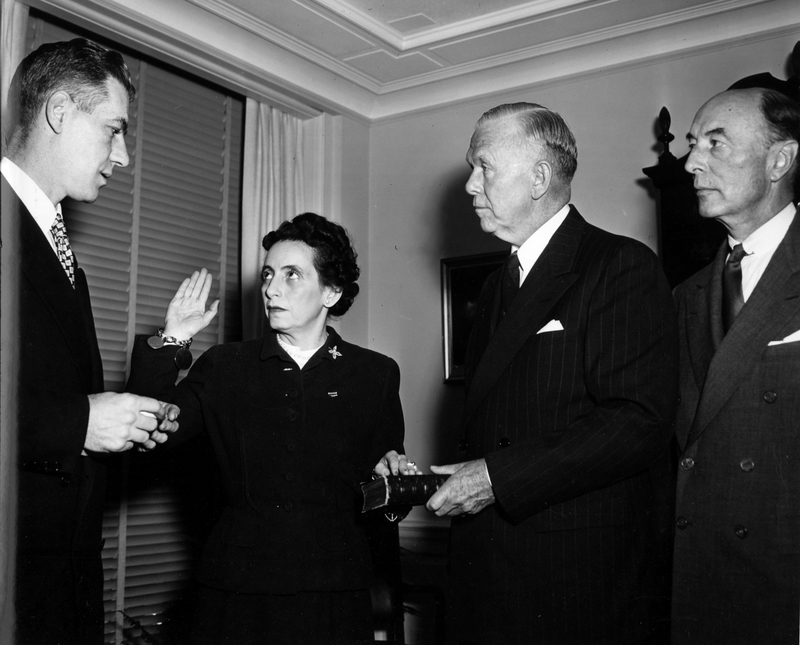
Anna M. Rosenberg being sworn in as Assistant Secretary of Defense

When Rosenberg was sworn in as Assistant Secretary of Defense, she was the highest-ranking woman in the Department of Defense. She was to coordinate the Department's staffing, which was divided among many agencies. Also while in the position, Rosenberg worked to implement the National Security Act, promoted racial integration of the services, and supported legislation that safeguarded the rights of minorities in the military.

== State and local government ==
In 1955, New York City Mayor Robert F. Wagner Jr. selected her to serve on the New York City Board of Hospitals. Rosenberg also served on Governor of New York W. Averell Harriman's Business Advisory Council and co-chaired the National Hearth Committee. In 1959, she chaired a three-member panel to mediate between the New York City Transit Authority and two unions.

In the early 1960s, she served on the New York City Board of Education among other bodies.

== Eisenhower and Kennedy administrations ==
Often called a confidante of FDR, Rosenberg was the top woman in the Truman administration; she was a close personal friend to Dwight D. Eisenhower and helped him pivot from the military to politics; she organized the 1962 birthday gala for President John F. Kennedy (made famous by Marilyn Monroe's rendition of "Happy Birthday"); and she counseled her friend Lyndon B. Johnson on issues ranging from the effect of automation on jobs to a more equitable formula for the Vietnam War draft.

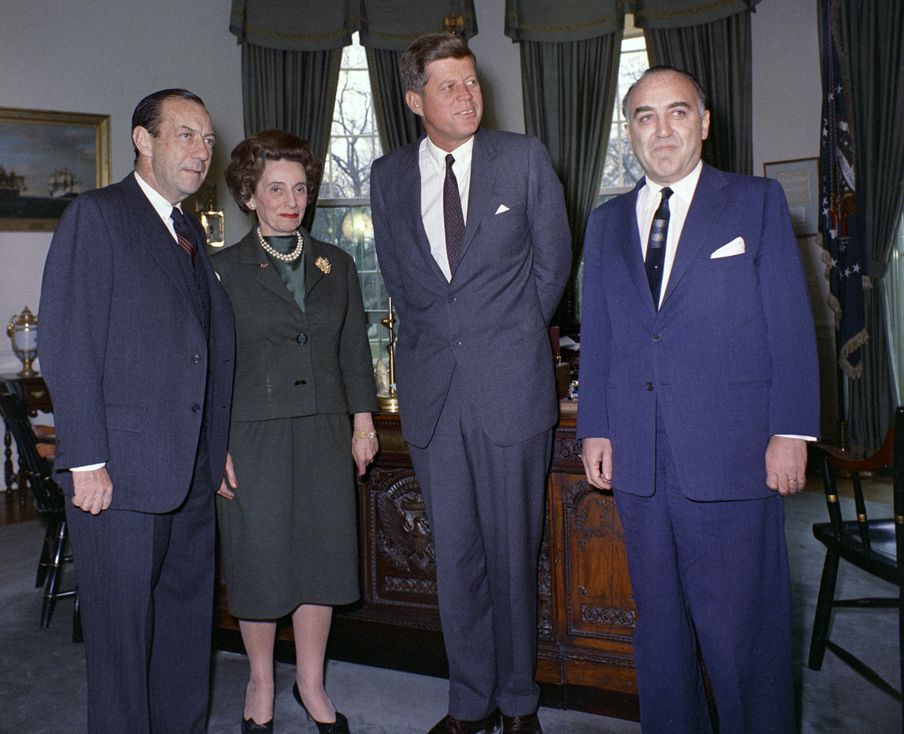
Rosenberg with Mayor Robert Wagner Jr., President Kennedy, and Arthur Krim, 1962

== Private sector ==
In 1945, Rosenberg founded a consulting business, Anna M. Rosenberg Associates. The firm's customers included the American Cancer Society, the American Hospital Association, the American College of Hospital Administrators, Encyclopædia Britannica, Inc., and Merriam-Webster. She continued to work at the firm until the day of her death.

== Later life ==
In 1919, she married Julius Rosenberg (known as "Mike") and the couple had a son Thomas the following year. Anna and Mike separated in 1957 and divorced in 1962. After her divorce was finalized in 1962, she married Paul G. Hoffman, the first administrator of the Marshall Plan and a senior United Nations official. Hoffman died in 1974.

Anna Marie Rosenberg died on May 9, 1983, in Manhattan. She had been suffering from cancer since 1982. She was 83.

== Awards and honors ==
- 1943: Honorary degree (Master of Humane Letters) Russell Sage College
- 1945: Medal of Freedom
- 1947: Medal for Merit
- 1951: Honorary degree (Doctor of Laws) from Tufts University
- 1952: Honorary degree (Doctor of Humane Letters) from Columbia University

== See also ==
- Madeleine Albright

== External sources ==
- Gorham, Christopher C. (2023). The Confidante: The Untold Story of the Woman Who Helped Win WWII and Shape Modern America. Citadel. ISBN 978-0-8065-4200-3.
- McHenry, Robert (ed.), Famous American Women: A Biographical Dictionary from Colonial Times to the Present, Dover Publications.
- United States. Congress. Senate. Committee on Armed Services, Nomination of Anna M. Rosenberg to be Assistant Secretary of Defense. U.S. Govt. Print. Off., 1950. 381 pages
- Anna Rosenberg Hoffman Papers.Schlesinger Library, Radcliffe Institute, Harvard University.
- McCarthy attacks Rosenberg's Nomination
- The Shalvi/Hyman Jewish Women's Encyclopedia: Anna Rosenberg
- Jewish Virtual Library entry
- Another bio with picture, at National Park Service
- Another bio on the Social Security site
- Nelson, Anna Kasten. "Anna M. Rosenberg, an "Honorary Man"." The Journal of Military History 68, no. 1 (2004): 133–61. http://www.jstor.org/stable/3397251.

Anna M. Rosenberg's FBI files obtained through the FOIA and hosted at the Internet Archive

- Part 1
- Part 2
- Part 3
- Part 4
- Part 5
- Part 6
- Part 7
- Part 8
- Part 9
- Part 10
- Part 11
- Part 12
- Part 13
