= Message to the Grass Roots =

1963 speech by Malcolm X

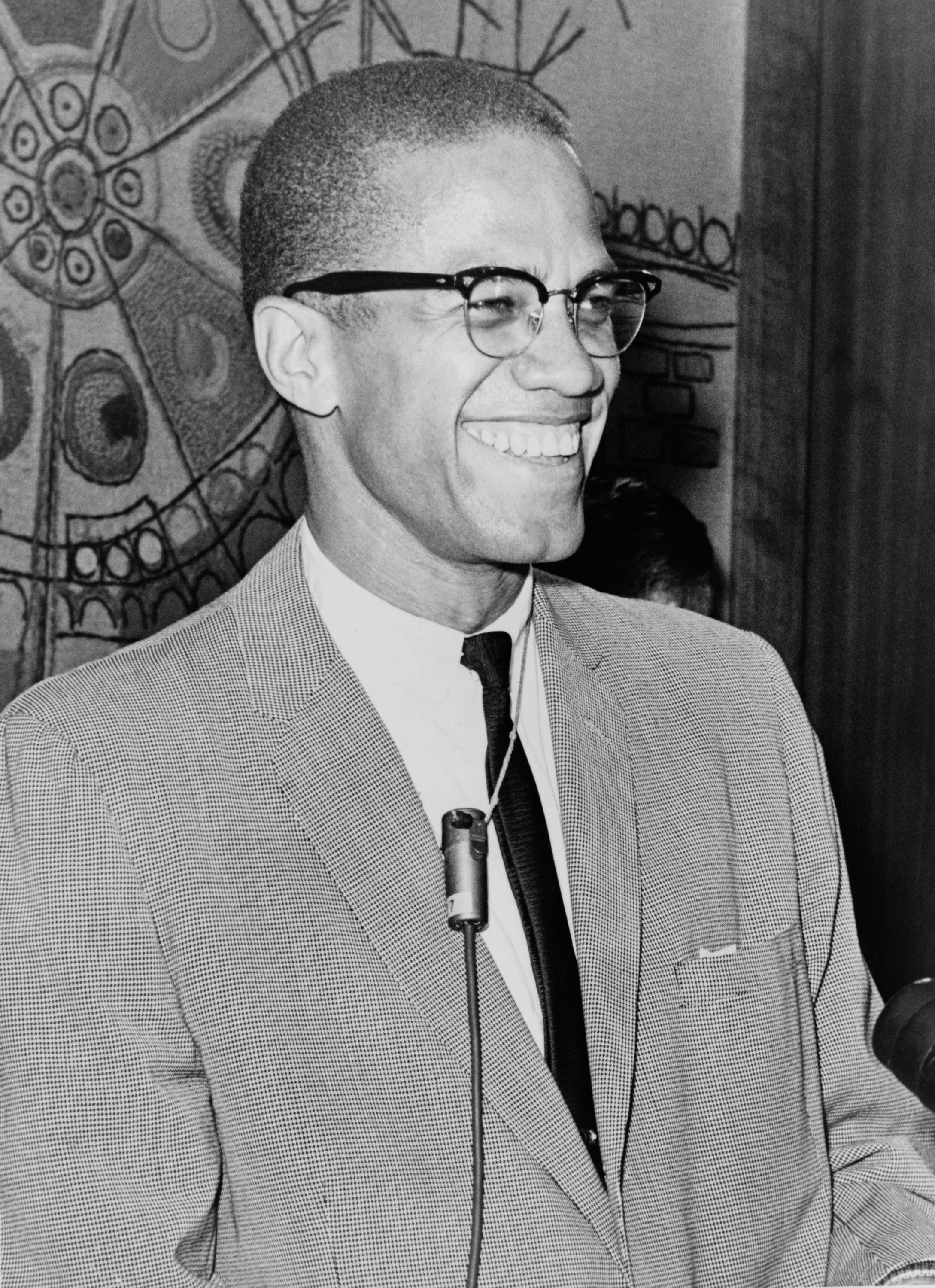
Malcolm X, four months after giving the speech

"Message to the Grass Roots" is a public speech delivered by black civil rights activist Malcolm X. The speech was delivered on November 10, 1963, at the Northern Negro Grass Roots Leadership Conference, which was held at King Solomon Baptist Church in Detroit, Michigan. Malcolm X described the difference between the "Black revolution" and the "Negro revolution", he contrasted the "house Negro" and the "field Negro" during slavery and in the modern age, and he criticized the 1963 March on Washington. "Message to the Grass Roots" was ranked 91st in the top 100 American speeches of the 20th century by 137 leading scholars of American public address.

== The speech ==
=== A common enemy ===
Malcolm X began his speech by emphasizing the common experience of all African Americans, regardless of their religious or political beliefs:

What you and I need to do is learn to forget our differences. When we come together, we don't come together as Baptists or Methodists. You don't catch hell because you're a Baptist, and you don't catch hell because you're a Methodist. You don't catch hell 'cause you're a Methodist or Baptist. You don't catch hell because you're a Democrat or a Republican. You don't catch hell because you're a Mason or an Elk, and you sure don't catch hell because you're an American; because if you were an American, you wouldn't catch hell. You catch hell because you're a Black man. You catch hell, all of us catch hell, for the same reason.

Not only did Black Americans share a common experience, Malcolm X continued, they also shared a common enemy: white people. He said that African Americans should come together on the basis that they shared a common enemy.

Malcolm X described the Bandung Conference of 1955, at which representatives of Asian and African nations met to discuss their common enemy: Europeans. He said that just as the members of the Bandung Conference put aside their differences, so Black Americans must put aside their differences and unite.

=== The Black revolution and the Negro revolution ===
Next, Malcolm X spoke about what he called the "Black revolution" and the "Negro revolution". He said that Black people were using the word "revolution" loosely without realizing its full implications. He pointed out that the American, French, Russian, and Chinese Revolutions were all carried out by people concerned about the issue of land, and that all four revolutions involved bloodshed. He said that the Black revolutions taking place in Africa also involved land and bloodshed.

By contrast, Malcolm X said, advocates of the Negro revolution in the United States think they can have a nonviolent revolution:

You don't have a peaceful revolution. You don't have a turn-the-other-cheek revolution. There's no such thing as a nonviolent revolution. The only kind of revolution that's nonviolent is the Negro revolution. The only revolution based on loving your enemy is the Negro revolution. ... Revolution is bloody, revolution is hostile, revolution knows no compromise, revolution overturns and destroys everything that gets in its way. And you, sitting around here like a knot on the wall, saying, "I'm going to love these folks no matter how much they hate me." No, you need a revolution. Whoever heard of a revolution where they lock arms, singing "We Shall Overcome"? You don't do that in a revolution. You don't do any singing, you're too busy swinging. It's based on land. A revolutionary wants land so he can set up his own nation, an independent nation. These Negroes aren't asking for any nation—they're trying to crawl back on the plantation.

=== The house Negro and the field Negro ===
Malcolm X spoke about two types of enslaved Africans: the "house Negro" and the "field Negro". The house Negro lived in his owner's house, dressed well, and ate well. He loved his master as much as the owner loved himself, and he identified with his owner. If the master got sick, the house Negro would ask, "Are we sick?" If somebody suggested to the house Negro that he escape slavery, he would refuse to go, asking where he could possibly have a better life than the one he had.

Malcolm X described the field Negros, who he said were the majority of slaves on a plantation. The field Negro lived in a shack, wore raggedy clothes, and ate chittlins. He hated his owner. If the owner's house caught fire, the field Negro prayed for wind. If the owner got sick, the field Negro prayed for him to die. If somebody suggested to the field Negro that he escape, he would leave in an instant.

Malcolm X said that there are still house Negroes and field Negroes. The modern house Negro, he said, was always interested in living or working among white people and bragging about being the only African American in his neighborhood or on his job. Malcolm X said the Black masses were modern field Negroes and described himself as a field Negro.

=== The March on Washington ===
Finally, Malcolm X spoke about the March on Washington, which had taken place on August 28, 1963. He said the impetus behind the march was the masses of African Americans, who were angry and threatening to march on the White House and the Capitol. Malcolm X said there were threats to disrupt traffic on the streets of Washington and at its airport. He described it as the Black revolution.

Malcolm X said that President Kennedy called the Big Six civil rights leaders and told them to stop the march, but they told him they couldn't. "Boss, I can't stop it, because I didn't start it." "I'm not even in it, much less the head of it." Malcolm X described how white philanthropist Stephen Currier called a meeting in New York to set up the Council for United Civil Rights Leadership, which provided money and public relations for the Big Six leaders, who took control over the March. As a result, he said, the March on Washington lost its militancy and became "a circus".

They controlled it so tight, they told those Negroes what time to hit town, how to come, where to stop, what signs to carry, what song to sing, what speech they could make, and what speech they couldn't make; and then told them to get out town by sundown. And everyone of those Toms was out of town by sundown.

== Analysis ==
"Message to the Grass Roots" was one of Malcolm X's last speeches as a member of the Nation of Islam. A few weeks after delivering the speech, Elijah Muhammad, the Nation's leader, silenced Malcolm X for comments he made with respect to the assassination of President Kennedy. On March 8, 1964, Malcolm X announced his departure from the Nation of Islam.

In some ways, "Message to the Grass Roots" can be viewed as a sign of Malcolm X's impending separation from the Nation of Islam. In it, he spoke not as a Muslim minister but as a leader of the Black masses. Gloria Richardson, who was present, later remembered: "That was when I really wondered how long it would be before he broke with [the Nation of Islam]."

"Message to the Grass Roots" was the most "political" speech Malcolm X had delivered to that time. The political message of the speech was beyond the teachings of the Nation of Islam.

Some of the themes touched on by Malcolm X in "Message to the Grass Roots" were familiar ones. The distinction between the Black revolution and the Negro revolution, and that between the house Negro and the field Negro, had become common features of his speeches.

Regarding the March on Washington, theologian James H. Cone writes that "Malcolm's language was harsh, but it was the truth". According to Cone, the march was controlled by the Black bourgeoisie and the white liberals who financed it. The organizers forced John Lewis to rewrite his speech because it was considered offensive to the Kennedy administration, and James Baldwin was not allowed to speak out of fear for what he might say.

== Legacy ==
Public Enemy edited two samples from "Message to the Grass Roots" for the introduction to their 1987 song "Bring the Noise", making it sound like Malcolm X said "Too black, too strong."

In 1988, an edited quote from the speech was used at the beginning of the song "Cult of Personality" by Living Colour:

And during the few moments that we have left, we want to talk right down to earth in a language that everybody here can easily understand.

In 1990, DJ Hype and Phivos Sebastiane with the alias "The Scientist" used a cut from the speech for their breakbeat hardcore song "The Exorcist":

Our religion teaches us to be intelligent. Be peaceful, be courteous, obey the law, respect everyone; but if someone puts his hand on you, send him to the cemetery.

Gang Starr used part of "Message to the Grass Roots" for the beginning of their song "Tonz 'O' Gunz" from their 1994 album "Hard to Earn".

Composer Hideki Naganuma used a sample of the "too black, too strong" excerpt for "Wrapped in Black", the final boss theme of the 2005 video game Sonic Rush.

== Key excerpts ==
- "We want to have just an off-the-cuff chat between you and me, us. We want to talk right down to earth in a language that everybody here can easily understand."
- "It's just like when you've got some coffee that's too black, which means it's too strong. What you do? You integrate it with cream, you make it weak. If you pour too much cream in, you won't even know you ever had coffee. It used to be hot, it becomes cool. It used to be strong, it becomes weak. It used to wake you up, now it'll put you to sleep."

== See also ==
- Bibliography of Malcolm X
- Bibliography of Martin Luther King Jr.
