= Council for United Civil Rights Leadership =

US organization

- Abbreviation: CUCRL
- Formation: June 1963
- Purpose: Civil rights
- Headquarters: New York City
- Location: United States
- Region served: United States

Council for United Civil Rights Leadership (CUCRL) was an umbrella group formed in June 1963 to organize and regulate the Civil Rights Movement. The Council brought leaders of Black civil rights organizations together with white donors in business and philanthropy. It successfully arranged the August 1963 March on Washington for Jobs and Freedom with the Kennedy administration.

The Council encompassed groups with different strategies and agendas, from the radical Student Nonviolent Coordinating Committee (SNCC) to the conservative National Association for the Advancement of Colored People (NAACP). By centralizing donations, the formation of the group muted disagreements over fundraising and membership. It worked to oppose tactics like civil disobedience and boycotts by controlling distribution of funds and by virtue of connections to the media establishment. Conflict nevertheless overcame the group quickly, and its money and power declined gradually until dissolution in January 1967.

== Formation ==
Preparatory work for the Council began when Stephen Currier, President of the Taconic Foundation, asked to meet with Rev. Martin Luther King Jr. of SCLC in February 1963.

With national attention on the Birmingham campaign, King became even more valuable as a high-profile fundraiser. Conflict intensified among movement leaders, particularly between King and NAACP chief Roy Wilkins. Historian David Garrow writes:

To a number of close observers, Wilkins' anger and the growing appearance of interorganizational competition were rooted basically in the heightened financial stakes that had resulted from the Birmingham crisis. That event had elevated King to the indisputable civil rights top spot in the American public's mind. It also meant that King's SCLC, rather than the long-established NAACP, would be the chief financial beneficiary of the new interest in civil rights.

On 19 June 1963, representatives from 96 corporations and foundations met for a fundraising breakfast at the Carlyle Hotel in Manhattan. $800,000 was raised. Donations came from the Ford Foundation and Rockefeller Foundation, and 93 other businesses and foundations in addition to the Taconic Foundation. Few or none of these were Black-owned.

Garrow continues:

At the Currier-sponsored breakfast the next morning, the Taconic Foundation's president recommended that the black leadership establish the Council for United Civil Rights Leadership (CUCRL) which, under Currier's auspices, would serve as a clearinghouse for dividing large contributions among all the organizations. Everyone present knew of Currier's great personal wealth, as well as his remarkable ability to generate funds from other well-to-do friends. No one dissented from his plan. The arrangement could lessen the growing internecine conflict before serious damage was done, and it was all but certain to provide each of the organizations with funds they otherwise would not receive.

The Council announced itself on 2 July 1963 after a meeting of the Leadership Conference on Civil and Human Rights. It told the New York Times that it was seeking $1,500,000 in "emergency" funds—and that it had already raised $800,000. The funds would be used, said the group, "to employ additional field staff to work in areas of greatest tension, to provide additional attorneys to handle the mounting number of court cases arising from mass arrests, and to strengthen the staffing of the seven organizations."

== Organization ==
The organizations involved were:

- The Southern Christian Leadership Conference (SCLC), led by Martin Luther King Jr. and other ministers
- The National Association for the Advancement of Colored People (NAACP), a legal advocacy group led by Roy Wilkins
- The NAACP Legal Defense and Educational Fund (LDF)—a group which split from the NAACP in 1957—under Director-Counsel Jack Greenberg
- The National Urban League, a community organizing group led by Whitney Young
- The National Council of Negro Women (NCNW), led by Dorothy Height
- The Student Nonviolent Coordinating Committee (SNCC), led by James Forman and soon also John Lewis
- The Congress of Racial Equality (CORE), directed by James Farmer and advised by Bayard Rustin

(According to Forman, SNCC was not initially included in the Council. He writes:

The insistence at first that SNCC be excluded from the council revealed a dislike that was never overcome. But the growing importance of SNCC in the field of human and civil rights made it impossible for those leaders to ignore its existence.

Forman's first Council meeting took place at the Carlyle Hotel after the March on Washington.)

Soon after its formation, the Council announced that it would be led by co-chairs Whitney Young and Stephen Currier. Outsiders attended meetings only by invitation, and leaders were not allowed to send delegates.

For public relations, the Council employed producer Victor Weingarten. Also involved from the White fund-raising world were tax lawyer Mel Dewitt and Jane Lee J. Eddy, director of the Taconic Foundation.

The Council formed a tax-exempt account called the Welfare, Education, and Legal Defense (WELD) Fund. The fund was managed by civil rights lawyer Wiley A Branton. WELD received additional money ($50,000) from the Rockefeller Brothers Fund.

In its first disbursement of funds, the Council allocated $125,000 to the NAACP, $125,000 to the Urban League, $100,000 for the NAACP LDF, $100,000 to CORE, $50,000 to the SCLC, $50,000 for the NCNW Educational Foundation, and $15,000 for SNCC.

=== Conflict within the Council ===
SNCC, one of the more radical groups, was dissatisfied to receive the smallest amount, but stayed in the coalition. Promising access to large amounts of money allowed the CUCRL to regulate SNCC, CORE, and the SCLC—considered the more radical groups within the Council. Historian Charles W. Eagles writes:

... it is essential to appreciate the admixture of motives that lay behind the mid-1963 creation of CUCRL: first, a firm desire on the part of wealthy white movement supporters such as the Taconic Foundation President Stephen R. Currier to stabilize if not eliminate the increasing visible and hostile competition between civil rights groups for contributors' dollars; second, a wish to moderate the southern movement's increasingly aggressive and demanding tone by giving NAACP chief Wilkins and National Urban League head Whitney Young, a good friend of Currier's a regular and intimate forum for propounding their views to the more direct action-oriented leaders of SNCC, CORE, and SCLC; and, third, an intent to exert some control over SNCC's angriest inclinations by centralizing at least a part of movement fundraising and using the resulting allocation process as a carrot-and-stick inducement for SNCC to follow a "responsible" course.

Later accounts from participants also described the Council as competitive and harsh. Forman (of SNCC) wrote that the group felt like

a jungle of civil rights hyenas, each distrustful of the other, each with personal grievances against the other, each agreeing to curb some of his hostility so that he could get just a little more money for programs with which everyone else probably disagreed.

James Farmer of CORE wrote:

The United in CUCRL's name was more a posture than a reality. These were no joint chiefs of staff poring over maps to determine where and when the final assault was to be launched and by which branch of the forces. There was, instead, a jockeying for position to determine who would be first to march victoriously into the nations' heartland, and for whom the flags would be waved and the bugles sounded.

Farmer reports a dialogue between Wilkins and King:

Wilkins: One of these days, Martin, some bright reporter is going to take a good hard look at Montgomery and discover that despite all the hoopla, your boycott didn't desegregate a single city bus. (This was to help the sgregation of law) It was the quiet NAACP-type legal action that did it.
King: We're fully aware of that, Roy. And we in the SCLC believe that it's going to have to be a partnership between nonviolent direct action and legal action if we're going to get the job done.
Wilkins: In fact, Martin, if you have desegregated anything by your efforts, kindly enlighten me.
King: Well, I guess about the only thing I've desegregated so far is a few human hearts.
Wilkins (nodding): Yes, I'm sure you have done that, and that's important. So keep on doing it; I'm sure it will help the cause in the long run.

== March on Washington ==
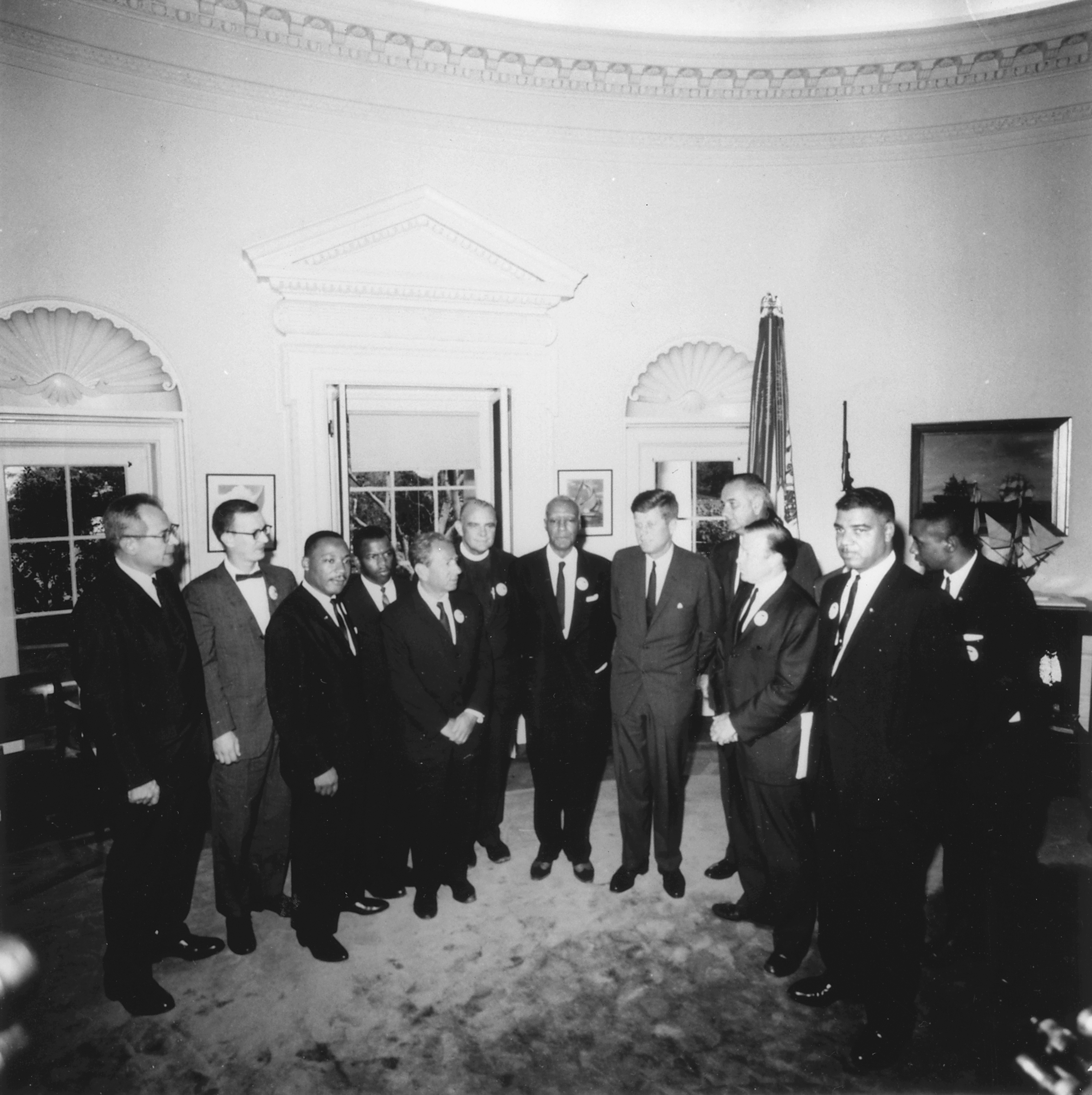
Civil rights, labor leaders, and politicians celebrate after the March.

The announcement of the new group coincided with endorsements of the Kennedy Civil Rights Act (eventually the Civil Rights Act of 1964) and with public planning for the March on Washington for Jobs and Freedom. On 22 June 1963 (three days after the first Carlyle Hotel meeting) Currier, Young, Wilkins, King, Randolph, Farmer met at the White House with President John F. Kennedy, Vice President Lyndon B. Johnson, and Attorney General Robert F. Kennedy. The meeting proceeded smoothly, and the CUCRL leaders agreed with the Kennedy administration that the main focus of the March would be support for new legislation.

The group stated explicitly that the March on Washington would not involve civil disobedience. The Times reported that the group "said it was trying to improve control over current racial demonstrations and insure nonviolence." "We want to provide a cadre of experienced Negro leaders who will prevent things from getting out of hand and keep irresponsible elements from turning to violence," said a spokesperson for the Council. The organizers re-routed the march, so that instead of visiting Capitol Hill to petition Congress, it would travel directly from the Washington Monument (at the center of the National Mall) to the Lincoln Memorial. Attendees would only be allowed to hold signs displaying one of five official statements.

To co-chair the March, the CUCRL designated the "Big Six" leaders: Young, Wilkins, Randolph, Farmer, King, and Lewis.

Dorothy Height experienced discrimination because of sexism, being constantly excluded and trivialized despite supposedly equal membership in the Council. She wrote that after the organization and execution of the March on Washington, "women became much more aware and much more aggressive in facing up to sexism in our dealings with the male leadership in the movement."

=== Malcolm X ===
Malcolm X claimed in his November 1963 "Message to the Grass Roots" speech that the White power structure created the Council for United Civil Rights Leadership specifically for the purpose of infiltrating and coopting a revolutionary march on Washington. His account parallels those assembled later by historians, beginning with discord among moderate civil rights leaders: "As these Negroes of national stature began to attack each other, they began to lose their control of the Negro masses."

X suggests that revolutionary actions became inevitable after the breakdown of nonviolence in Birmingham:

Negroes was out there in the streets. They was talking about we was going to march on Washington. By the way, right at that time Birmingham had exploded, and the Negroes in Birmingham—remember, they also exploded. They began to stab the crackers in the back and bust them up 'side their head—yes, they did. That's when Kennedy sent in the troops, down in Birmingham. [...] the Negroes started talking—about what? We're going to march on Washington, march on the Senate, march on the White House, march on the Congress, and tie it up, bring it to a halt; don't let the government proceed. They even said they was [sic] going out to the airport and lay down on the runway and don't let no airplanes land. I'm telling you what they said. That was revolution. That was revolution. That was the black revolution. It was the grass roots out there in the street. Scared the white man to death, scared the White power structure in Washington, D. C. to death; I was there.

He goes on to describe the meeting in the Carlyle Hotel:

A philanthropic society headed by a white man named Stephen Currier called all the top civil-rights leaders together at the Carlyle Hotel. And he told them that, "By you all fighting each other, you are destroying the civil-rights movement. And since you're fighting over money from white liberals, let us set up what is known as the Council for United Civil Rights Leadership. Let's form this council, and all the civil-rights organizations will belong to it, and we'll use it for fund-raising purposes." Let me show you how tricky the white man is. And as soon as they got it formed, they elected Whitney Young as the chairman, and who [do] you think became the co-chairman? Stephen Currier, the white man, a millionaire.

Once these leaders agreed to the CUCRL bargain, they gained access to the resources of the white power structure:

Soon as they got the setup organized, the white man made available to them top public relations experts; opened the news media across the country at their disposal; and then they begin to project these Big Six as the leaders of the march. Originally, they weren't even in the march.

As a result, the March did not threaten systemic racism:

They controlled it so tight—they told those Negroes what time to hit town, how to come, where to stop, what signs to carry, what song to sing, what speech they could make, and what speech they couldn't make; and then told them to get out town by sundown. And everyone of those Toms was out of town by sundown.

=== Audio rights ===
King announced in October 1963 that he was assigning all rights to the recording of his "I Have a Dream" speech to the Council.

The Council subsequently released an official recording of speeches at the March, titled "We Shall Overcome". It includes speeches from King, Wilkins, Young, Rustin, Lewis, Randolph, Walter Reuther, and Joachim Prinz, as well as music from Joan Baez, Bob Dylan, Odetta, Marian Anderson, and Peter, Paul & Mary. This record sold for $3.00 by mail or $3.98 retail.

Legal action was taken to halt sales of other recordings. Clarence Jones argued that Mr. Maestro, Inc., and Twentieth Century Fox had infringed on the group's copyright. The defendants argued that King was a public figure and his words were in the public domain.

== Christmas boycott ==
After the August March on Washington, Artists and Writers for Justice, a group including Ruby Dee, Louis Lomax, and James Baldwin, proposed a mass boycott of Christmas shopping.

King and the SCLC initially announced support for the boycott. But soon afterwards, the CUCRL announced its opposition. The New York Times reported that King "had had second thoughts on the proposal and had decided to go along with the thinking of the other civil rights leaders on the matter".

Roy Wilkins said both that the boycott would be impossible to organize nationally and that it would be harmful to the interests of the civil rights movement. Wilkins argued instead for selective buying campaigns, and for Christmas donations to the CUCRL. The Council created a "Holiday Gift Fund", through which people could donate to the CUCRL in another person's name.

Baldwin and others, including Rep. Adam Clayton Powell, maintained support for the boycott, saying the Council did not represent Black Americans.

== Civil Rights legislation ==
After President Kennedy was killed in November 1963, the CUCRL described civil rights legislation as his "unfinished business" and pledged support to new President Lyndon B. Johnson.

The group welcomed Civil Rights Act of 1964 and released a statement saying "we look forward to an end to the need for protest and contest".

Currier resigned his position in September 1964.

== Other activities ==
Farmer (CORE) reports that the group was generally reluctant to support unconventional actions. The Council opposed affirmative action laws even after Farmer discussed them with President Johnson, and dissuaded Farmer from appearing with Malcolm X in a televised debate. ("I think all of us should agree here in CUCRL that none of the top leaders will appear on a platform, radio, or TV with Malcolm X because we just give him an audience", said Young.)

Forman (SNCC) writes that anti-communism created recurring problems for the group. He describes one episode in which Currier met with him alone and asked him to stop SNCC from using the National Lawyers Guild. He says that Young and others constantly pressured the group to pass anti-communist ("red-baiting") resolutions, opposed only by himself and King.

Forman also says that in 1964, Wilkins used the group to push for a moratorium on demonstrations in order to assist with Johnson's election campaign.

After the Civil Rights Act, the group lost momentum and power. Meetings became less frequent and money stopped coming in. (Forman writes: "By 1965 the Council on United Civil Rights Leadership was raising less and less money while trying to inflict more and more of its conservative positions on the movement.") Division over U.S. warfare in Southeast Asia increased tension to the breaking point. "Johnson needs a consensus. If we are not with him on Vietnam then he is not going to be with us on civil rights", said Young. Leaders of SNCC and CORE (as well as King, though perhaps not the rest of the SCLC) disagreed strenuously.

In February 1966, the Council had only $67,000, which it distributed among members.

On the initiative of Jack Greenberg, the organization was dissolved in January 1967.

Stephen Currier and his wife Audrey Bruce Currier also disappeared in January 1967 when their private airplane vanished while on a flight near Puerto Rico. Currier had recently donated $43,500 to the dying CUCRL. Two-thirds of the Currier fortune was left to the Taconic Foundation.

== See also ==
- List of people who disappeared mysteriously at sea
