= Wir Juden =

1934 book by Joachim Prinz

- Author: Joachim Prinz
- Subject: History
- Genre: Non-fiction
- ISBN: 978-3-911-00206-6

Wir Juden (We Jews) is a 1934 book by German rabbi Joachim Prinz that concerns Hitler's rise to power as a demonstration of the defeat of liberalism and assimilation as a solution for the "Jewish Question", and advocated a Zionist alternative to save German Jews. The book urged German Jews to escape National Socialist persecution by emigrating to Palestine. Prinz himself was expelled in 1937, travelling to the US where he became a leader of the American Jewish community and the Civil Rights Movement.

== The critique of assimilation ==
Written in 1933 and published in 1934, it was, according to historian Francis R. Nicosia a "pointed rejection of the largely assimilationist tradition in German Jewry and a call to all Jews to embrace Jewish culture and heritage". In it, Prinz promotes Theodor Herzl's rejection of assimilation and support of Zionism, and argues that antisemites have done "... more to preserve Jewry and to awaken an active Jewish impulse than the Jews themselves...". Historian Michael A. Meyer writes that "... Prinz argued that the triumph of nationalism over political liberalism should now drive the Jews to the only possible solution of the Jewish question: the acceptance of their own status as a nation". To that end, Prinz proposed "a new law to replace assimilation with the avowal of the Jewish nation and the Jewish race". He continued: "A state built upon the principle of the purity of nation and race can only be honored and respected by a Jew who declares his belonging to his own kind. Having so declared himself, he will never be capable of faulty loyalty towards a state. The state cannot want other Jews but such as declare themselves as belonging to their nation.

Prinz bases his argument on an analysis of Jewish Emancipation. Before Emancipation, he suggested, Jews in the Ghetto had enjoyed inner freedom, cultural wealth and dignity. Emancipation had been an abrupt break with this, which had been problematic for most Jews. Prinz sharply criticised the dominant liberal tradition of Germany Jewry, exemplified by Moses Mendelsohn, and he argued that the conversion to Christianity of Mendelsohn's children embodied the logic of assimilation and the fatal price of integration.

Prinz theorized that the fall of liberalism, as signified by Hitler's ascension, meant the end to the possibility of assimilation of Jews into the larger European community:

The meaning of the German Revolution for the German nation will eventually be clear to those who have created it and formed its image. Its meaning for us must be set forth there: the fortunes of liberalism are lost. The only form of political life which has helped Jewish assimilation is sunk.

Controversially, Prinz also urged practical co-operation with the Nazi government to save Jewish lives:

For its practical aims, Zionism hopes to be able to win the collaboration even of a government fundamentally hostile to Jews, because in dealing with the Jewish question not sentimentalities are involved but a real problem whose solution interests all people’s, and at the present moment especially the German people.

Nicosia writes that "Prinz clearly saw little alternative to embellishing the ethno-nationalist basis of Zionism with terminology that the Nazis might find familiar and, perhaps, even appealing". Similarly, historian Guy Miron argues that "Prinz's critique of the emancipated Jewry reverberates with the language of the contemporary völkisch (“radical ethnic-nationalistic”) critique of modernity and liberalism."

== Reception ==
Prinz's book was highly controversial at the time. Liberal Jews in particular (such as Bruno Weil, Karl-Heinz Flietzer and Rabbi Manfred Swarsensky), writing in the Centralverein Zeitung, condemned his fatalistic attitude and defended the legacy of Emancipation. Conservative Jewish leader Hans Joachim Schoeps of the Deutscher Vortrupp student movement argued it was still possible for German Jews to become fully integrated into the German folk body, in a process of "real" assimilation.

== Legacy ==
=== Usage by critics of Judaism ===
Controversial Israeli critic Israel Shahak mentioned Wir Juden in his critique of Judaism, Jewish History, Jewish Religion: The Weight Of Three Thousand Years. Shahak claimed that the book was full of crude flatteries of Nazi ideology and glee about the decline of the ideas of the French Revolution. Shahak accuses Prinz of representing various evils of the Jewish religion. Shahak's accusations against Prinz have been echoed by anti-Jewish activists, such as David Duke, former Grand Wizard of the Knights of the Ku Klux Klan, in his book Jewish Supremacism: My Awakening to the Jewish Question.

=== Usage by anti-Zionists ===
The book has also been controversial because anti-Zionists have attempted to make the case that Zionists like Prinz were not primarily concerned helping Jews to escape Nazi oppression, discrimination, bigotry, and persecution. Anti-Zionists like Lenni Brenner have claimed that Prinz's advocacy for German Jews to escape to a Homeland for the Jewish people is somehow an indication that the Zionists approved of Nazi anti-Jewish values. David Duke's accusations against Prinz, for instance, have been repeated by anti-Zionists to claim that Prinz's Zionism contains fascist and racist elements, even though Prinz's subsequent career in the United States was intimately involved with the Civil Rights movement, the March on Washington, and other anti-fascist and anti-racist campaigns.

=== Usage by Holocaust-Deniers ===
Deniers of the Holocaust and groups with neo-Nazi affiliations, such as the Institute for Historical Review, have also repeated unsubstantiated claims that Wir Juden indicates an association between Jewish Zionism and the Anti-Semitic Nazis. They often bolster these claims with quotes taken out of context, and invariably neglect to mention Prinz's long career as a civil-rights leader and anti-fascist.

== Subsequent defense of Prinz ==
Defenders of Prinz say that while he may have been naive at first, he was also a vocal opponent to Nazism. They contrast this with those who did not see the coming danger and add that he saw some ideas as useful only in limited context at best.
