= Eugene Carson Blake =

American Presbyterian minister (1906–1985)

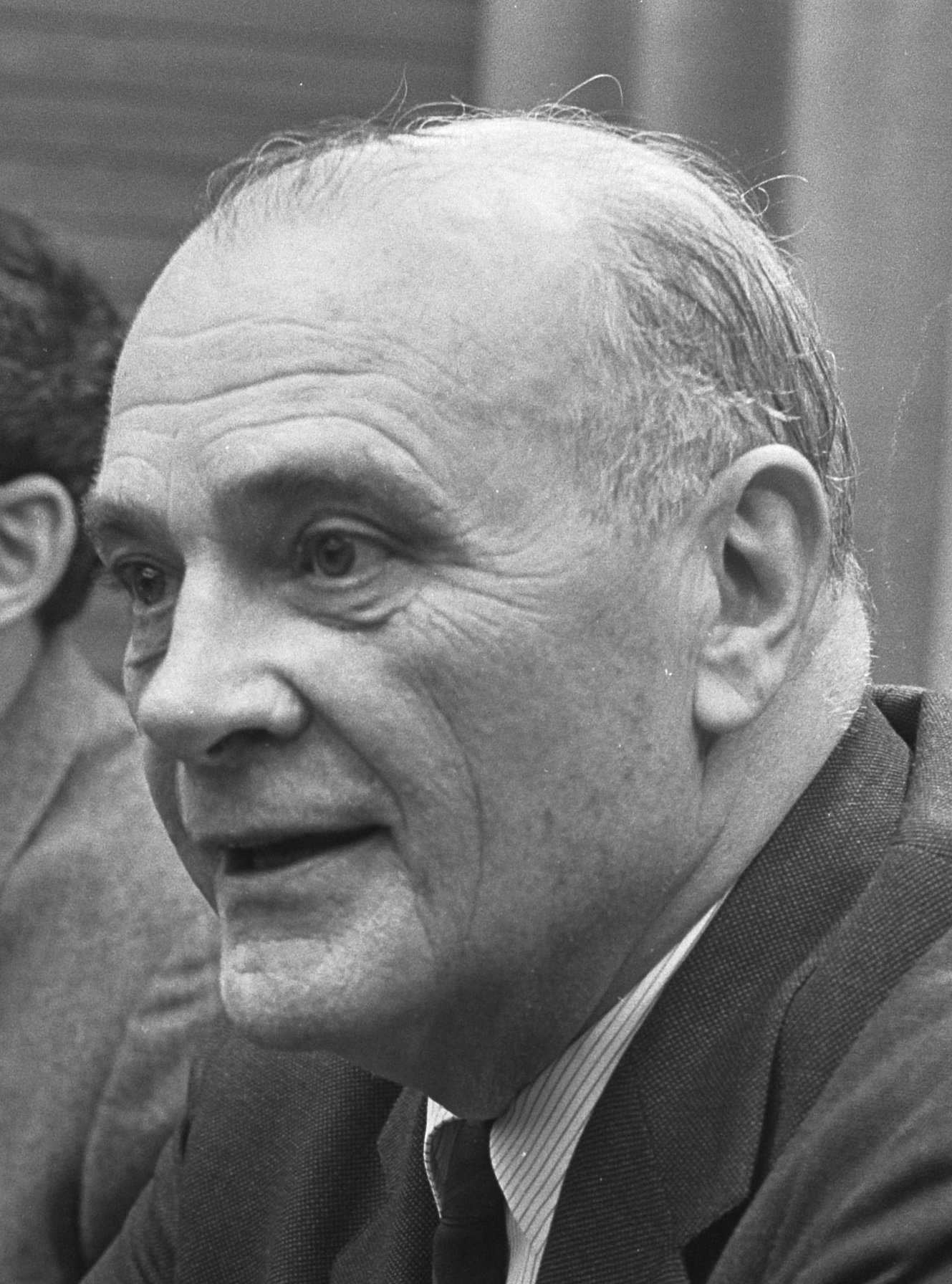
- Blake in 1967
- Born: November 7, 1906; St. Louis, Missouri, U.S.
- Died: July 31, 1985 (aged 78); Stamford, Connecticut, U.S.
- Education: Princeton University (BA); Princeton Theological Seminary (ThB)
- Spouses: Valina Gillespie (m. 1929; died 1973); Jean Ware Hoyt (m. 1974)

Eugene Carson Blake (November 7, 1906 – July 31, 1985) was an American Presbyterian Church leader.

From 1954 to 1957 he served as president of the National Council of Churches in the United States; from 1966 to 1972 he served as General Secretary of the World Council of Churches. He also helped organize and would subsequently participate in the 1963 March on Washington.

== Life and career ==
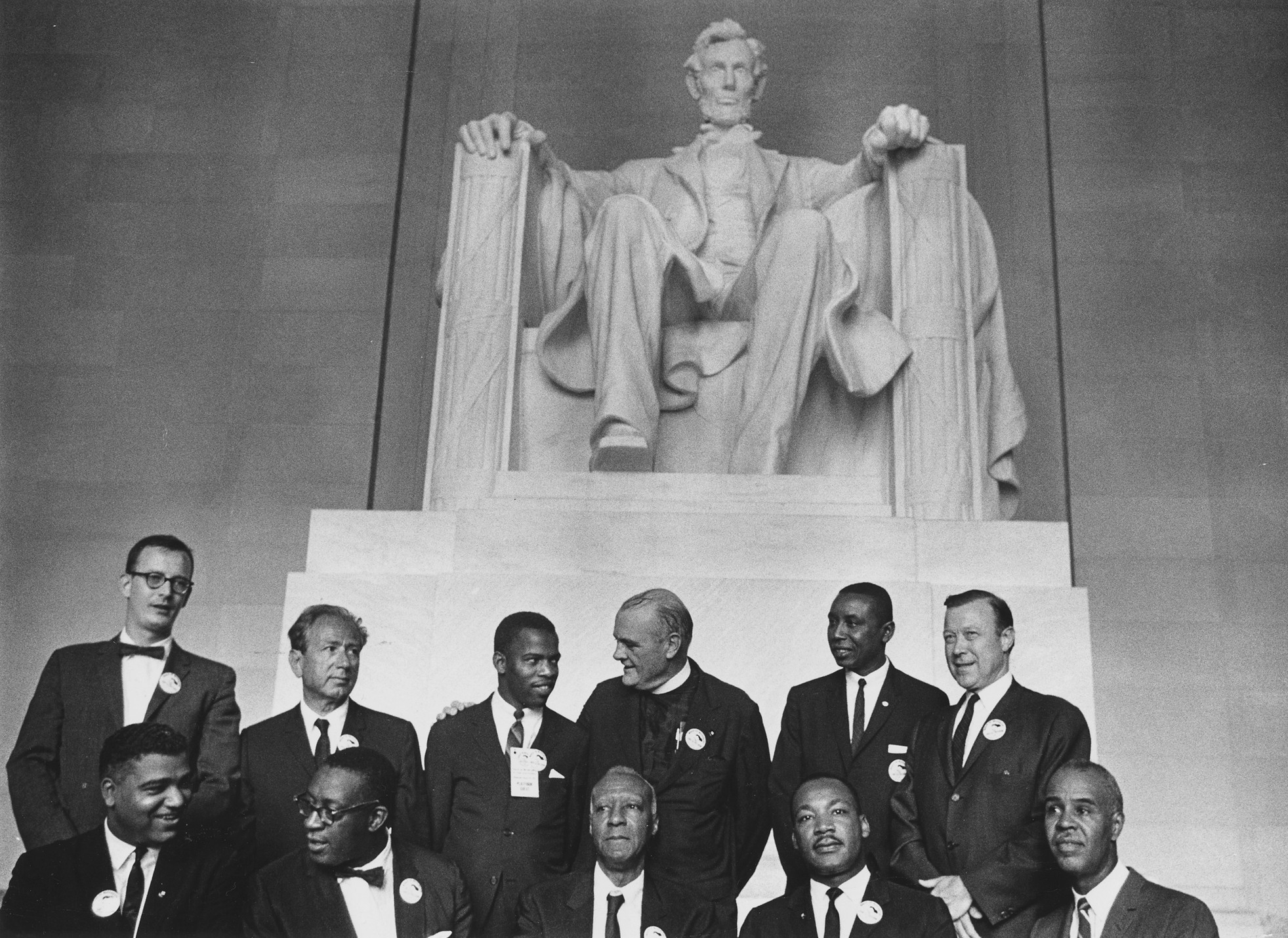
Blake (standing, third from right) at the Lincoln Monument with leaders of the March on Washington

Eugene Carson Blake was born in St. Louis, Missouri on November 7, 1906, the son of Lulu and Orville Prescott Blake. He graduated from Princeton University in 1928 with a Bachelor of Arts and the Princeton Theological Seminary in 1932 with a Bachelor of Theology. He would also attend classes at the University of Edinburgh.

From 1928 to 1929, he taught at the Forman Christian College in Lahore; from 1935 to 1951, he was the minister of Presbyterian churches in America, holding pastorates at churches in New York City and Albany, as well as serving as the Senior Minister of Pasadena Presbyterian Church in Pasadena for eleven years.

From 1951 to 1958, he was stated clerk of the General Assembly of the PCUSA, and of the United Presbyterian Church until 1966. He served as the president of the National Council of Churches from 1954 to 1957 and the General Secretary of the World Council of Churches in 1966. Blake retired from the World Council of Churches in 1972.

Blake became a trustee of Princeton Seminary in 1954.

Although an experienced and talented administrator, Eugene Carson Blake is best known for his forthright stand against racial segregation as well for his progressive stance on a number of issues affecting Protestant church denominations. In 1960, he preached a sermon calling for the unification of a number of major Protestant denominations into one separate church. This sermon is considered to be the impetus for the 40-year Consultation on Church Union ecumenical effort to unite ten mainline denominations.

In 1963, Martin Luther King Jr. and Blake, along with the rest of the "Big Six" and Mathew Ahmann, Walter Reuther, and Rabbi Joachim Prinz called for a March on Washington for Jobs and Freedom on August 28, 1963. King, Blake, and the other organizers met with President John F. Kennedy at the White House before the event, and subsequently participated in the demonstration, marching down Constitution Avenue with linked arms. At the Lincoln Memorial, Blake spoke to the marchers following A. Philip Randolph and before John Lewis. Martin Luther King gave his "I Have a Dream" speech a few minutes later.

== Death ==
Blake died in 1985. He is buried in Stamford's Long Ridge Union Cemetery.

== Archival collections ==
There are multiple collections of Eugene Carson Blake's papers at the Presbyterian Historical Society in Philadelphia, Pennsylvania. They include papers relating to his tenure as stated clerk of the General Assembly, correspondence and addresses, and personal papers from 1940-1966.
