= Bierdzany =

Bierdzany Bierdzan
- Village
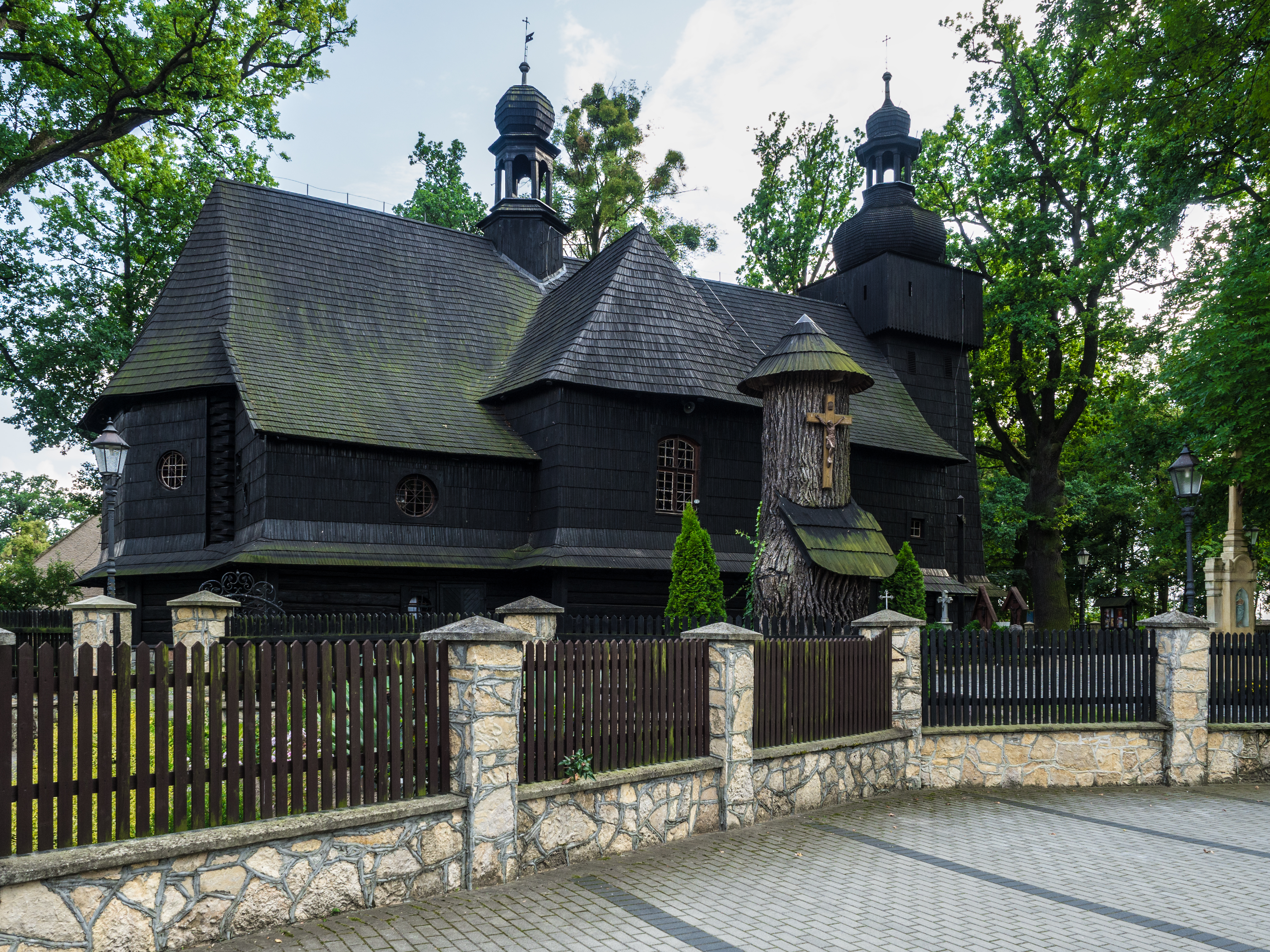
- Church of Saint Hedwig

- Location within Poland
- Coordinates: 50°49′N 18°9′E
- Country: Poland
- Voivodeship: Opole
- County: Opole
- Gmina: Turawa
- Time zone: UTC+1 (CET)
  - Summer (DST): UTC+2 (CEST)
- Vehicle registration: OPO

Bierdzany ([bjɛrˈd͡zanɨ], additional name in German: Bierdzan) is a village in the administrative district of Gmina Turawa, within Opole County, Opole Voivodeship, in south-western Poland.

The famous Berlin rabbi and civil rights leader Joachim Prinz was born there.
