= Mathew Ahmann =

American civil rights activist (1931–2001)

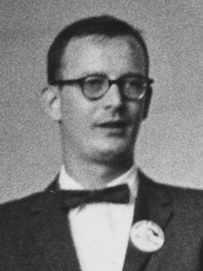
- Ahmann in 1963
- Born: September 10, 1931; St. Cloud, Minnesota, U.S.
- Died: December 31, 2001 (aged 70); Washington, D.C., U.S.
- Education: Saint John's University (BA); University of Chicago
- Spouse: Margaret Ahmann (m. 1954)
- Children: 6

Mathew H. Ahmann (September 10, 1931 – December 31, 2001) was an American Catholic layman and civil rights activist. He was a leader of the Catholic Church's involvement in the civil rights movement, and in 1960 founded and became the executive director of the National Catholic Council for Interracial Justice.

By initiating the 1963 National Conference on Religion and Race, Ahmann worked to establish the civil rights movement as a moral cause. He was one of four white men, along with Walter Reuther, Eugene Carson Blake, and Joachim Prinz, who joined the "Big Six" to organize the 1963 March on Washington for Jobs and Freedom. He gave a speech during the march that preceded the "I Have a Dream" speech of Martin Luther King Jr. Following the civil rights movement, he directed several civil rights and Catholic service initiatives. He is not commonly thought of when thinking of the civil rights movement but has been said to have acted as a catalyst for the Catholic Church's involvement in the movement.

== Early life and education ==
Ahmann was born on September 10, 1931, in St. Cloud, Minnesota, to Norbert Ahmann, a dentist, and Clothilda Ahmann, née Hall, a nurse. Ahmann's grandfather, Mathew Hall, was a German-American immigrant and St. Cloud businessman. Ahmann was the oldest of three brothers; religion was a large part of everyday life as they attended Catholic school and religious retreats. They each attended Saint John's Preparatory School in Collegeville, Minnesota. Ahmann grew up a Boy Scout and playing music in a band.

Ahmann studied social science at Saint John's University for three years. After graduating in 1952, he entered a master's degree program in sociology at the University of Chicago. Ahmann's brother David recalled:

When Matt announced he was going on to the University of Chicago the family promptly held a prayer meeting so that Matt wouldn't lose his faith. In fact, he found his faith.

Ahmann's intent was to finish his master's program but he left to focus on his work with the civil rights movement.

== Civil rights movement ==
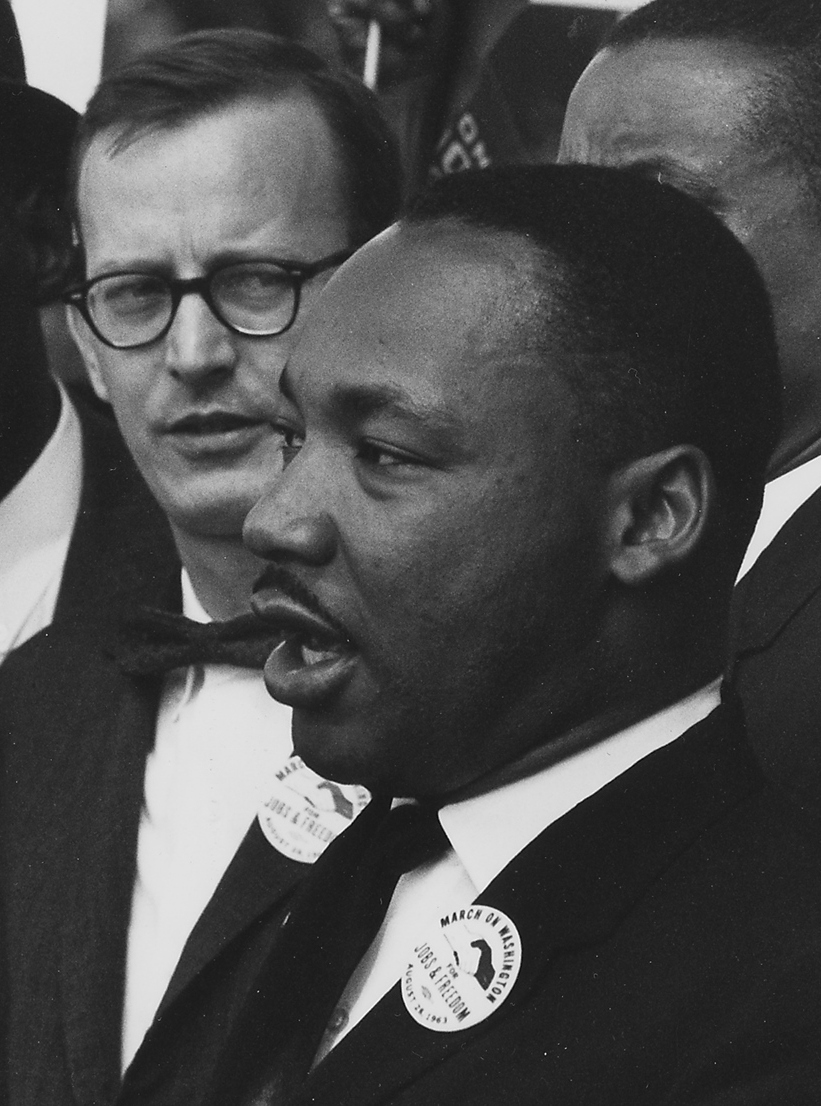
Ahmann on August 28, 1963, behind Martin Luther King Jr.

Ahmann worked in Chicago for several years as director of the Chicago Catholic Interracial Council. In 1960, he founded and became the executive director of the National Catholic Council for Interracial Justice. As director, Ahmann organized the National Conference on Religion and Race, the first national meeting on civil rights between Catholic, Protestant, and Jewish leaders. The conference was held at the Edgewater Beach Hotel in Chicago on January 14–17, 1963. Ahmann scheduled it to coincide with the Emancipation Proclamation's 100th anniversary. Ahmann said his goal for the conference was to:

examine the role of religious institutions in race relations and then move on to propose and inspire renewed action and interreligious projects to increase the leadership of religion in ending racial discrimination.

Leaders from 78 denominations attended, and speakers included Martin Luther King Jr., Sargent Shriver, and Abraham Joshua Heschel. One attendee said it was an achievement in itself that Protestant, Catholic, Jewish, and Orthodox leaders had even come together: "A total of 1,000 delegates – about 750 official delegates and 250 observer delegates" attended. After Ahmann's speech, Heschel invited Ahmann to the stage and said, "We are here because of the faith of a 33-year-old Catholic layman." Heschel kissed Ahmann on the head, and Ahmann received a standing ovation. A journalist who attended concluded that even if the attendees did nothing after they left the conference, they would never be the same. He also explained that after the conference it was expected that committees of the three religions would form on local and regional levels but in order to be successful they needed to be more unanimous in action, not independent.

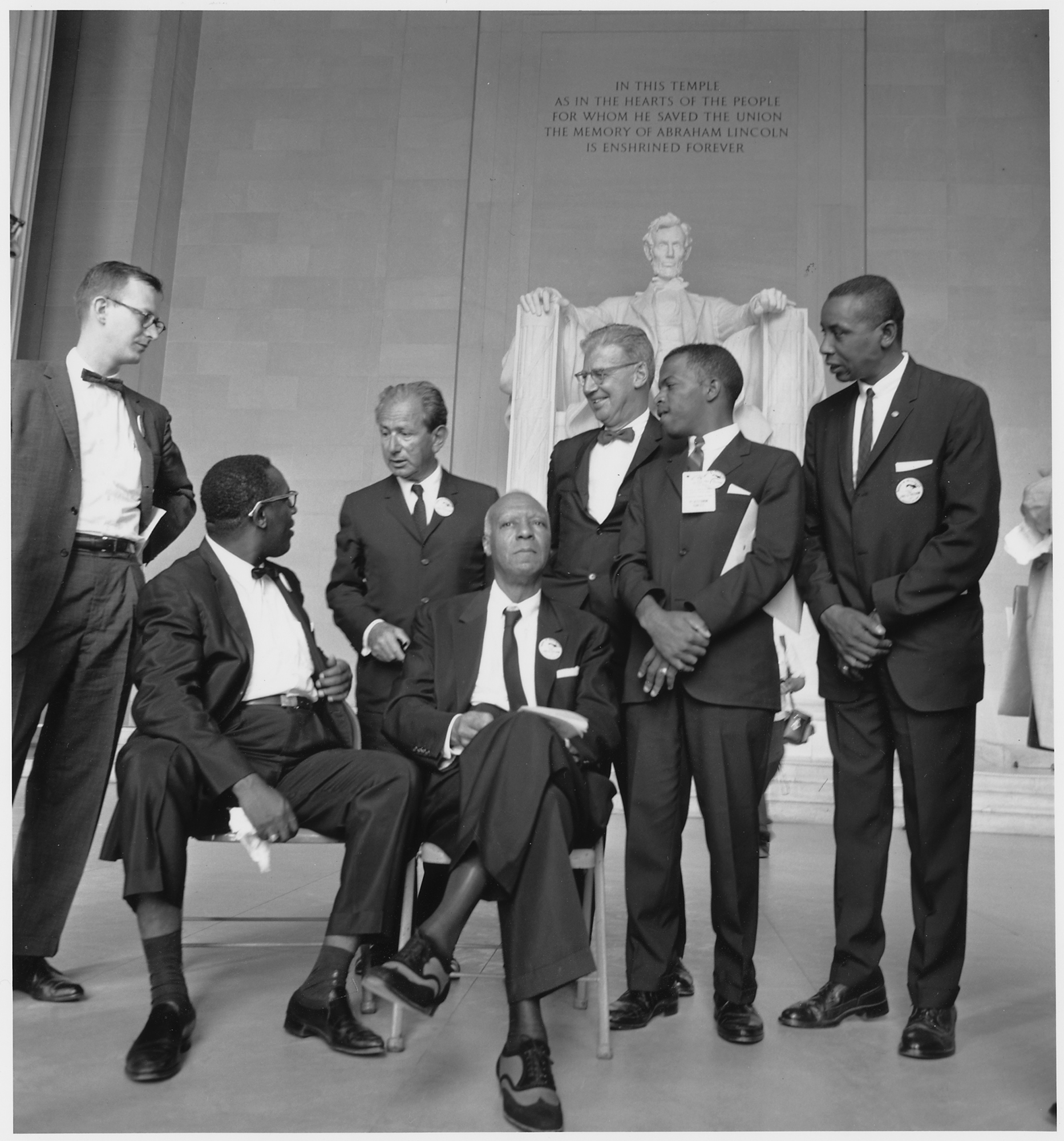
Ahmann (far left) at the Civil Rights March on Washington, D.C., 1963

Ahmann was asked by organizers of the 1963 March on Washington for Jobs and Freedom to find a Catholic bishop who would serve as a Catholic chairman for the march. Unable to find a willing bishop, Ahmann himself volunteered to join the organizing committee and make a speech at the march. Ahmann, as the Catholic presence, along with white leaders Walter Reuther, Eugene Carson Blake, and Joachim Prinz, joined the original "Big Six" to organize the march as the "Big Ten."

At the August 28 March on Washington, Ahmann gave a speech on the steps of the Lincoln Memorial. He asked:

Who can call himself a man, and take part in a system of segregation which frightens the white man into denying what he knows to be right, into denying the law of his God?

Ahmann's speech preceded King's "I Have a Dream" speech.

In 1965, Ahmann urged all United States diocese clergy to attend the Selma to Montgomery marches, in response to King's call for participation. In the same year, he gave the commencement speech at the College of Saint Benedict, where he encouraged women to fight for rights. In 1967, Ahmann wrote a letter to the incarcerated King, saying, "Our conference sends you greetings while you serve sentence for your witness for humanity, dignity and justice." The King Center has uploaded this telegram to their online archives for the public to view.

Ahmann continued to show his support to King and the movement in 1967 when he sent him a telegram on the 10-year anniversary of the Southern Christian Leadership Conference to congratulate them on all of the work they had done and continued to do for human rights.

== Later activities and death ==
Ahmann worked with the National Catholic Council for Interracial Justice until 1968. In 1969, he moved to Texas and became the executive director of the Commission on Church and Society for the Archdiocese of San Antonio. During the 1972 presidential election, Ahmann worked for vice-presidential candidate Sargent Shriver. He then worked for 16 years as the associate director of government relations for Catholic Charities USA in Washington, D.C. He was also an executive committee member of the Leadership Conference on Civil and Human Rights.

Ahmann died of cancer on December 31, 2001, at Sibley Memorial Hospital in Washington, D.C. A memorial Mass was held at the Shrine of the Most Blessed Sacrament in Washington, D.C., on January 12, 2002.

William L. Taylor remarked, "Mr. Ahmann was a quiet voice of conscience in the civil rights movement, who helped make the Leadership Conference the effective organization that it is today." In October 2013, Ahmann was posthumously awarded the Colman J. Barry Award for Distinguished Contributions to Religion and Society from Saint John's University.

== Personal life ==
In 1954, Ahmann married Margaret C. Ahmann. Together they raised six children.

== Bibliography ==
- The New Negro (1961)
- Race: Challenge to Religion (1963)
- The Church and the Urban Racial Crisis (1967), with Margaret Roach
