= Big Six (American activists) =

Group of six civil rights leaders in 1963 in the US

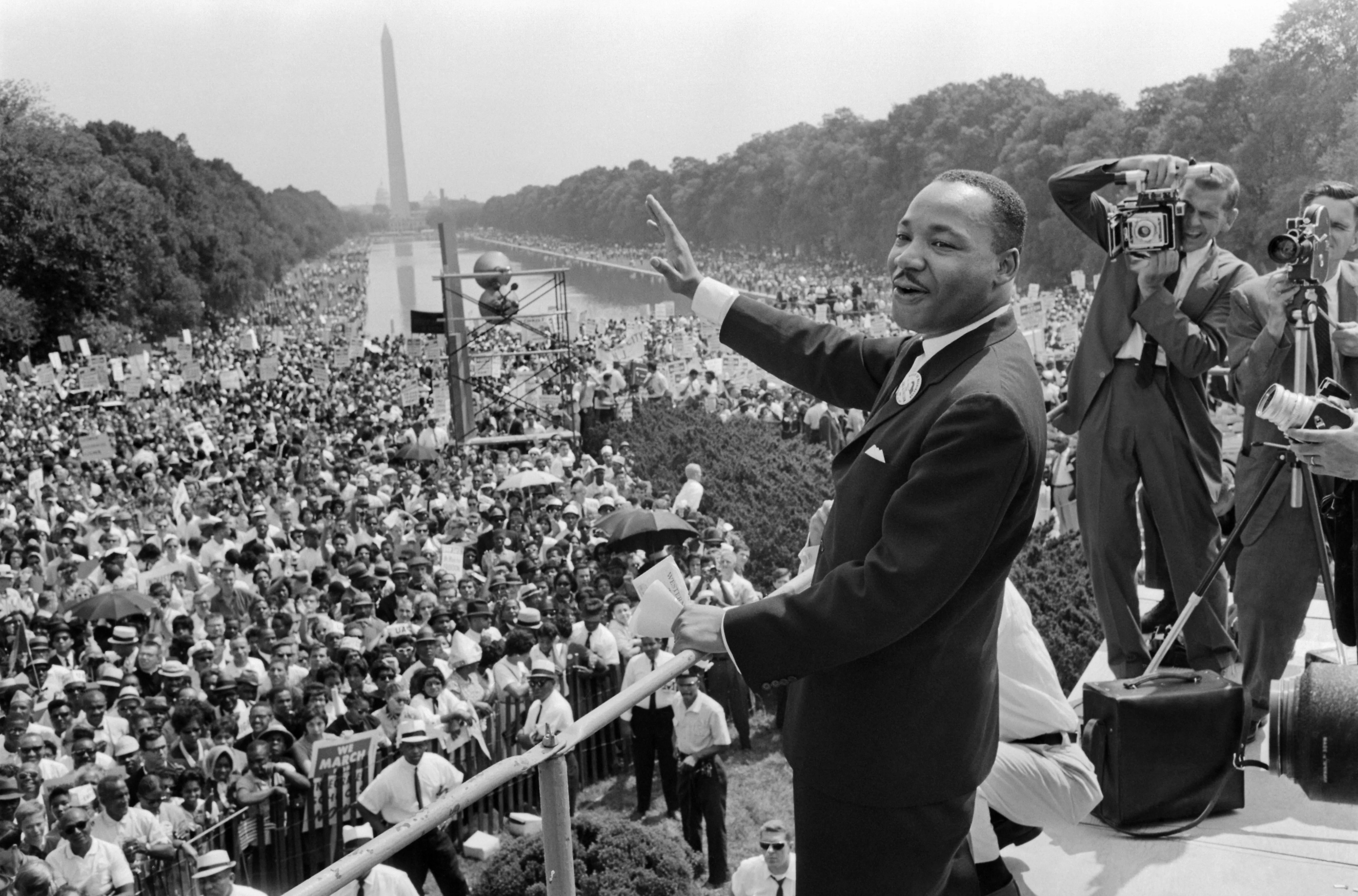
Martin Luther King Jr. giving his "I Have a Dream" speech, March on Washington for Jobs and Freedom, August 28, 1963

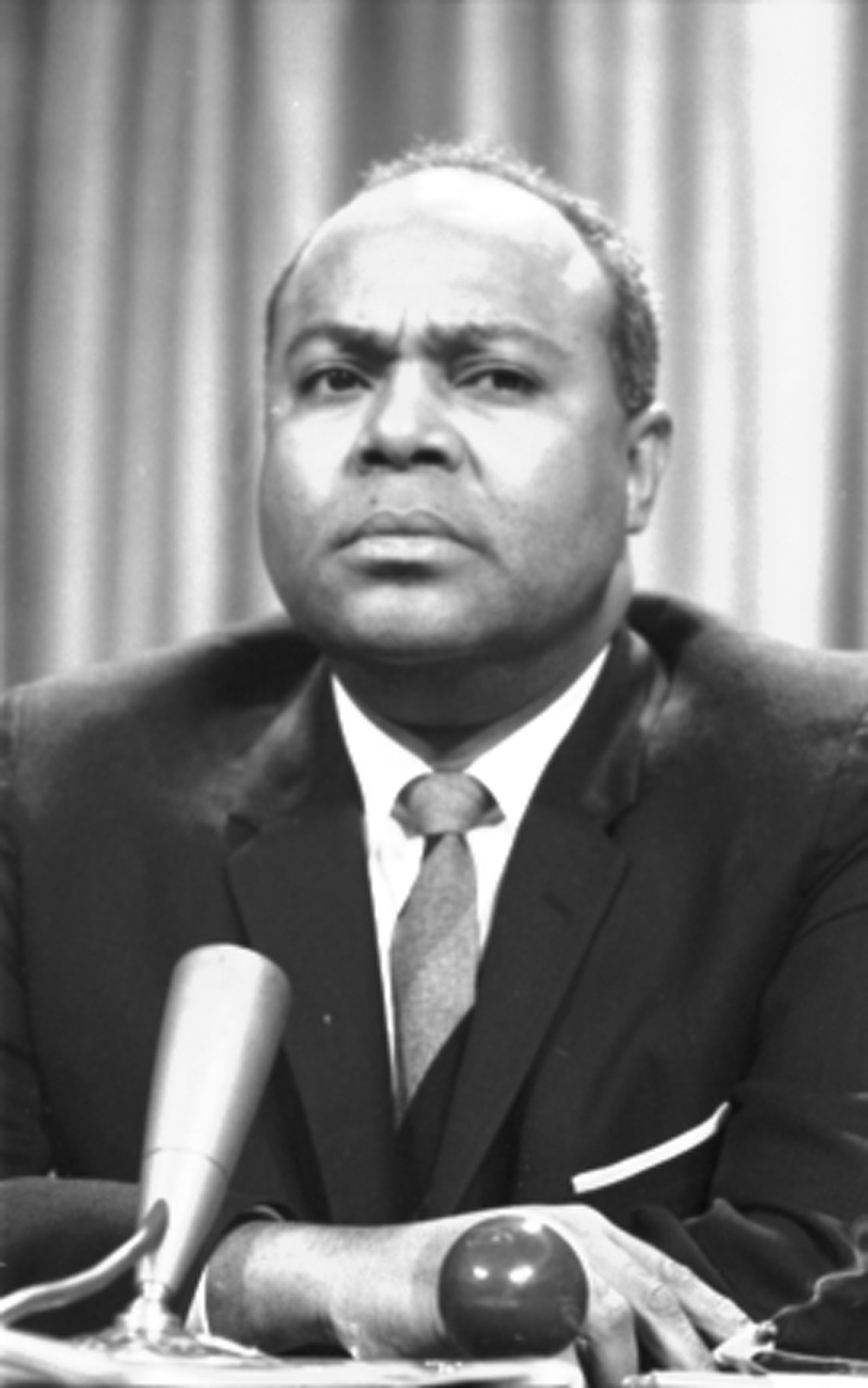
James Farmer

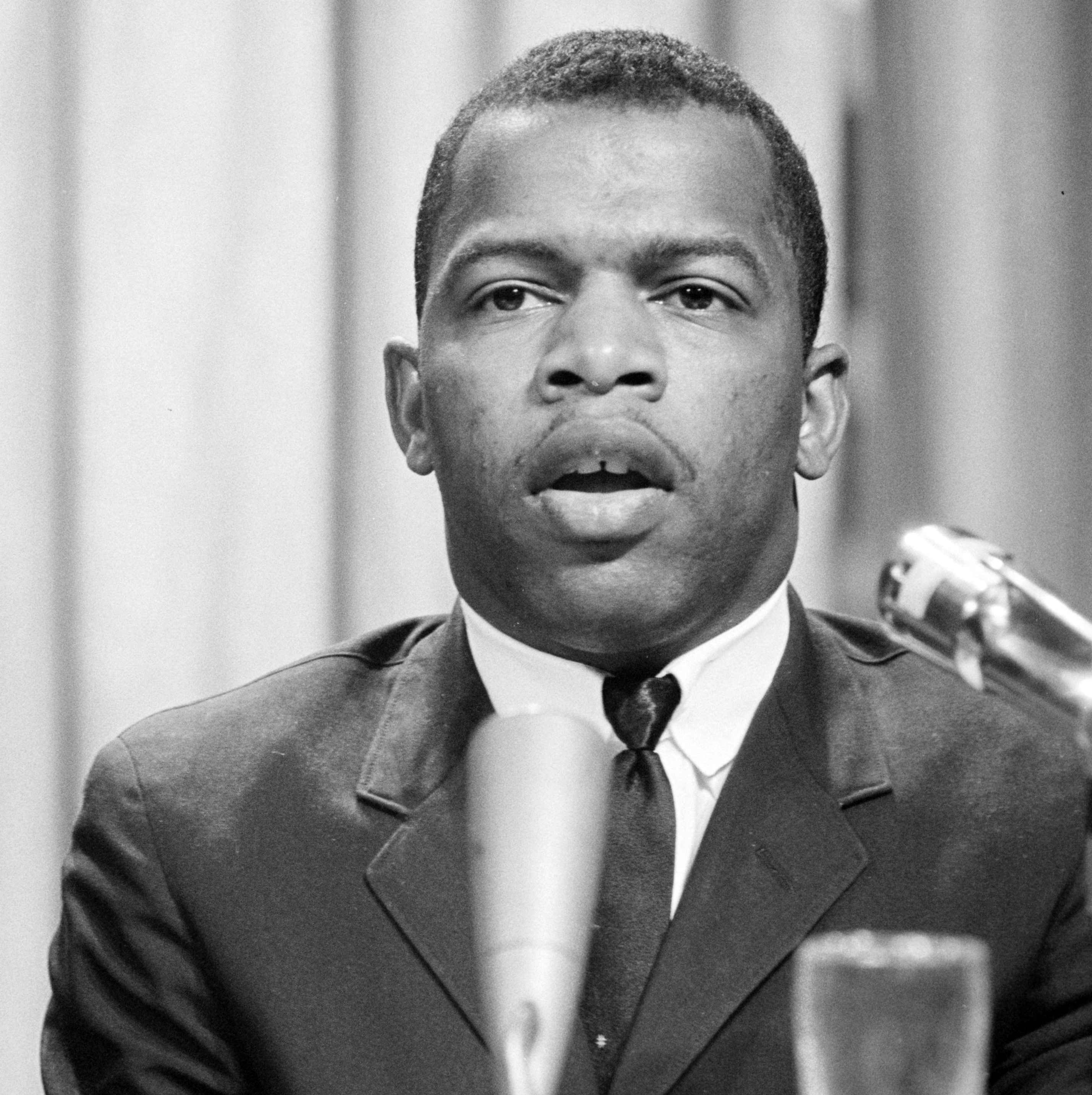
John Lewis

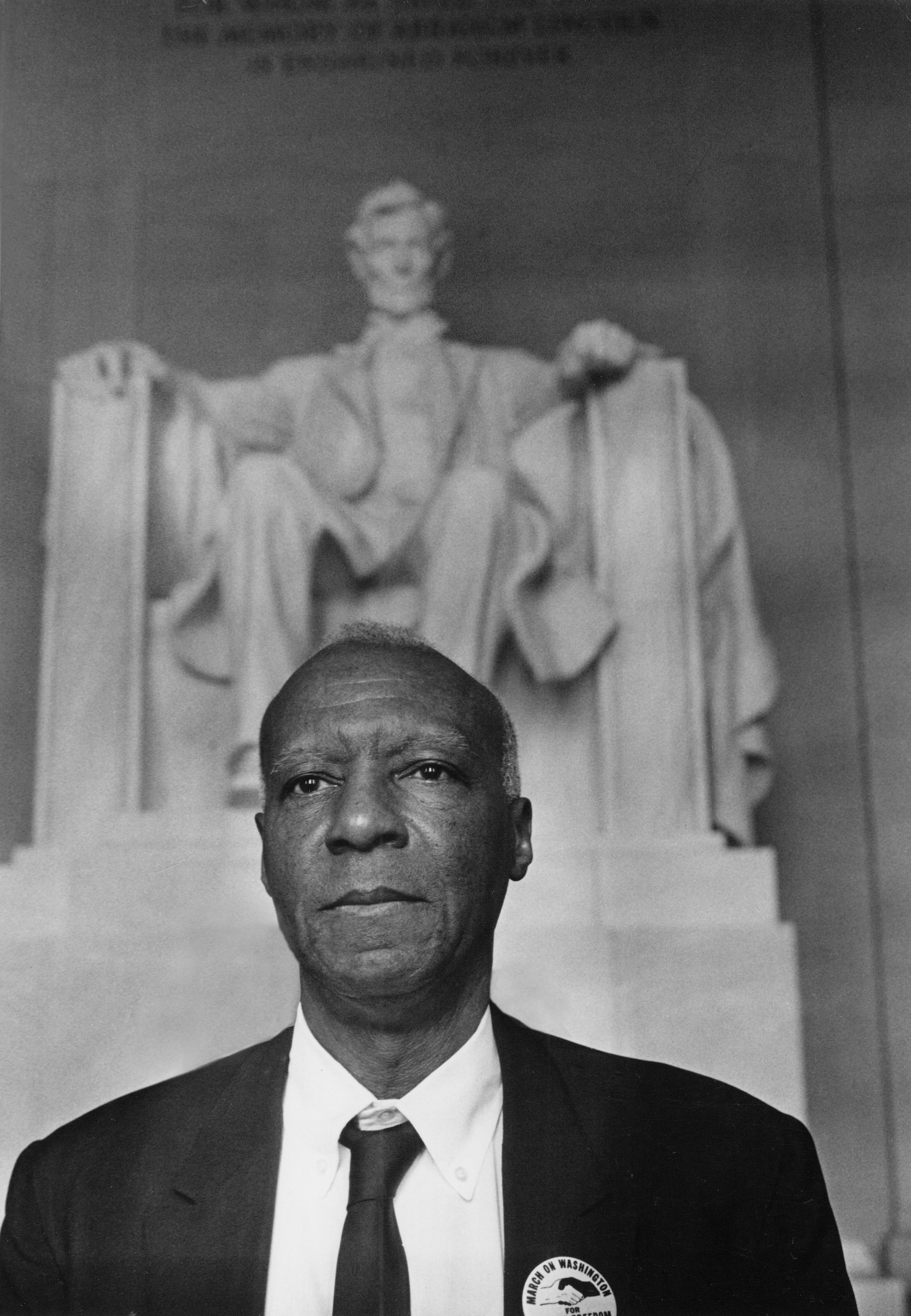
A. Philip Randolph

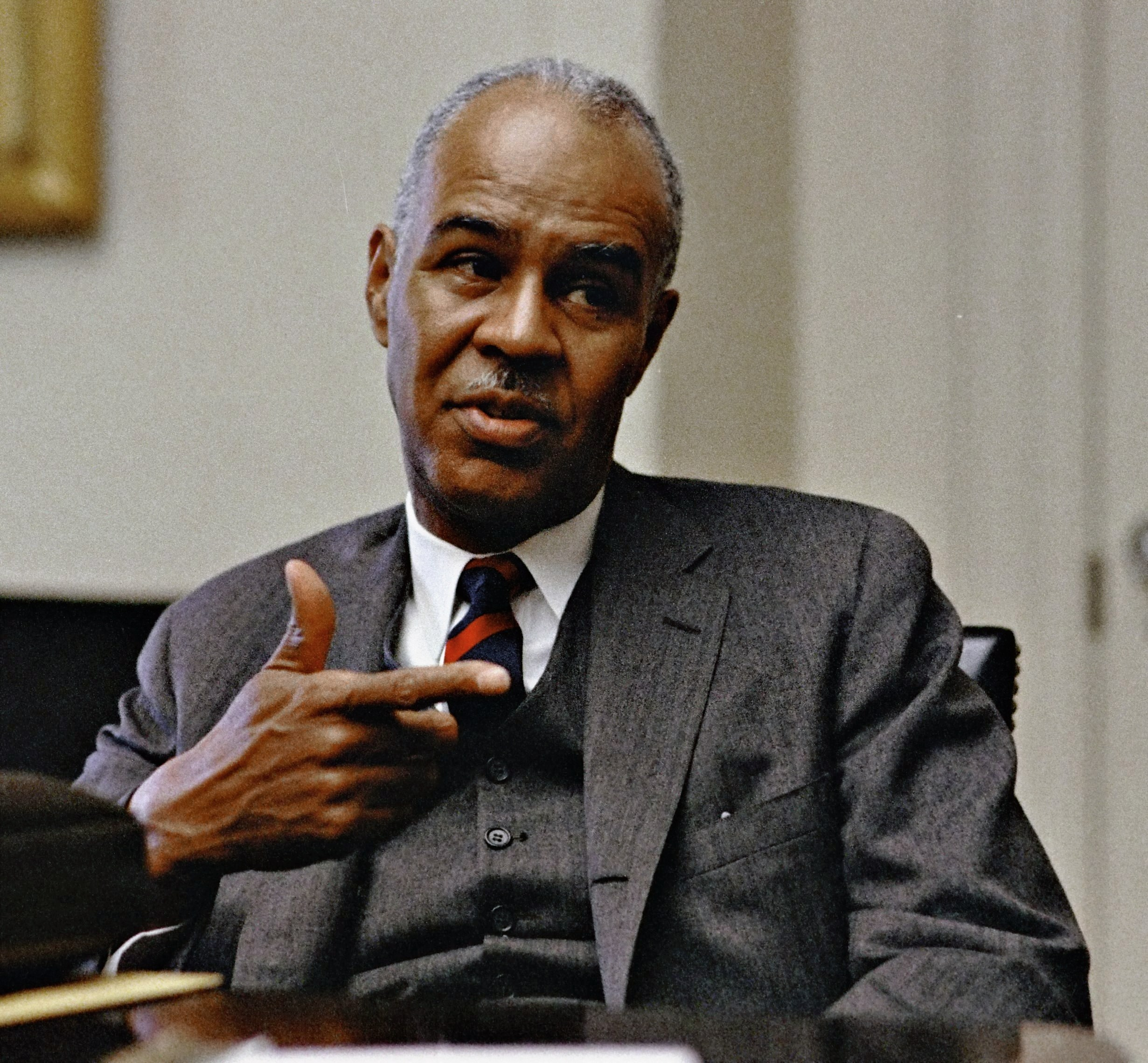
Roy Wilkins

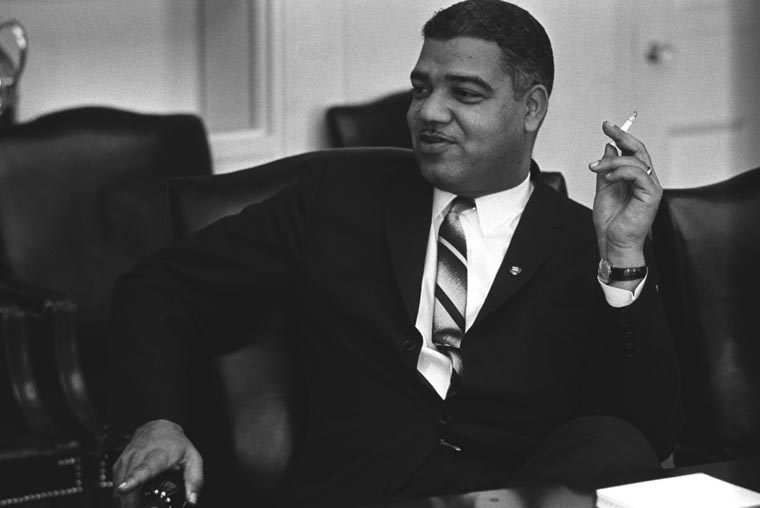
Whitney Young

The Big Six—Martin Luther King Jr., James Farmer, John Lewis, A. Philip Randolph, Roy Wilkins and Whitney Young—were the leaders of six prominent civil rights organizations who were instrumental in the organization of the March on Washington for Jobs and Freedom in 1963, at the height of the Civil Rights Movement in the United States.

In his autobiography, Lay Bare the Heart (1985), James Farmer identified the term "Big Six" as having originated with the founding of the Council for United Civil Rights Leadership. He did not include A. Philip Randolph in his list of the "Big Six", instead listing Dorothy Height, president of the National Council of Negro Women as the sixth member of the group. He also noted that the press often referred to the group as the "Big Four", excluding Height and John Lewis, which he attributed to sexism and age bias, respectively.

Patrick Henry Bass, journalist and historian of the March on Washington, described the rise of these leaders to celebrity: "Increasingly, these six powerful men lived in two worlds: the political and the personal, one white, in which they were still strangers but becoming increasingly familiar with its insider/outsider rules; the other, black, where they were treated as extended members of the family."

About two months before the march, the Big Six broadened their organizing coalition by bringing on board four men who were not Black, but supported their efforts: Walter Reuther, president of the United Automobile Workers; Eugene Carson Blake, former president of the National Council of Churches; Mathew Ahmann, executive director of the National Catholic Conference for Interracial Justice; and Joachim Prinz, president of the American Jewish Congress. Together, the Big Six plus the four newcomers became known as the "Big Ten" leaders of organizations involved in creating the March on Washington.

== Big Six ==
=== Martin Luther King Jr. ===
Martin Luther King Jr. (January 15, 1929 – April 4, 1968), chairman of the Southern Christian Leadership Conference (SCLC), was a Baptist minister, activist, and the most well-known leader and spokesperson of the Civil Rights Movement. King won the Nobel Peace Prize in 1964 and he posthumously was awarded the Presidential Medal of Freedom in 1977, nine years after his assassination in 1968. For his promotion of nonviolence and racial equality, King is considered a peacemaker and martyr by many people around the world. Martin Luther King, Jr. Day in the United States was established in his honor, and a memorial to him stands on the nation's National Mall.

=== James Farmer ===
James Farmer (January 12, 1920 – July 9, 1999) founded the Congress of Racial Equality (CORE) in 1942, a pacifist organization dedicated to achieving racial harmony and equality through nonviolent protest and passive resistance, and was chosen to be its first national director in 1953. When Farmer's followers once asked, "When are you going to fight back?" Farmer's response was, "We are fighting back, we're only using new weapons." Farmer's teachings allowed sit-ins and the Freedom Rides to occur, attempts to battle segregation in restaurants and on transportation. These attempts allowed CORE to gain national traction, as people throughout the country were inspired to be volunteers for the organization to advocate for civil rights. Farmer later considered this surge of followers as "his proudest achievement".

Farmer was not present for the 1963 March on Washington since he was incarcerated in Louisiana for "disturbing the peace" after attempts to arrange protests. He launched a failed Congressional bid in 1968 and later faced criticism for his decision to be employed by President Richard Nixon, as Assistant Secretary of the Department of Health, Education, and Welfare, a job which Farmer claimed was an opportunity for African-Americans to directly influence federal policies. He was awarded the Presidential Medal of Freedom in 1998 for his efforts during the Civil Rights Movement, shortly before his death in 1999.

=== John Lewis ===
John Lewis (February 21, 1940 – July 17, 2020) became a leader in the Civil Rights Movement as president of the Student Nonviolent Coordinating Committee (SNCC) and as a participant with other civil rights leaders such as Diane Nash, James Bevel, and Bernard Lafayette in the Nashville Student Movement (1959–1962). Lewis was one of the original 13 Freedom Riders. While in college, he participated in sit-ins at segregated restaurants in Nashville. These sit-ins inspired others throughout the country to initiate sit-ins to protest segregation at lunch counters. Lewis, at 23 years of age, represented SNCC with a speech at the August 28, 1963 March on Washington, the youngest Big Six member to do so. Lewis represented the 5th District of Georgia, a district which includes almost all of Atlanta, in the United States House of Representatives from 1987 until his death from pancreatic cancer at age 80, the last surviving member of the Big Six. He was a recipient of both the John F. Kennedy Library's Profile in Courage Award for Lifetime Achievement in 2001 and the Presidential Medal of Freedom in 2010.

=== A. Philip Randolph ===
A. Philip Randolph (April 15, 1889 – May 16, 1979) was a socialist in the labor movement and the Civil Rights Movement. In 1925, he organized the Brotherhood of Sleeping Car Porters. This was the first serious effort to form a labor union for the employees of the Pullman Company, which was a major employer of African Americans. During World War II, Randolph was instrumental in the March on Washington Movement, which did not actually lead to a March on Washington but did result in the integration of war industries and ultimately the armed forces. He lived until 90 years old.

=== Roy Wilkins ===
Roy Wilkins (August 30, 1901 – September 8, 1981) was a prominent civil rights activist from the 1930s to the 1970s. In 1955, he was named executive director of the National Association for the Advancement of Colored People (NAACP). He had an excellent reputation as a spokesperson for the Civil Rights Movement. He participated in the March on Washington (1963), the Selma to Montgomery marches (1965), and the March Against Fear (1966).

=== Whitney Young ===
Whitney Young (July 31, 1921 – March 11, 1971) spent most of his career working to end employment discrimination in the South, and he was inspired to do so after his experience fighting in World War II and personally becoming a victim of this discrimination. In 1961, Young was elected the National Urban League's executive director, a position he held until his death in 1971. As executive director, he turned the National Urban League from a relatively passive civil rights organization into one that aggressively fought for justice, and he did so by introducing new educational policies and programs that did not estrange the white members of the league.

== See also ==
- Council for United Civil Rights Leadership
- March on Washington Movement
