= Joachim Prinz =

German-American rabbi and activist (1902–1988)

Rabbi Joachim Prinz
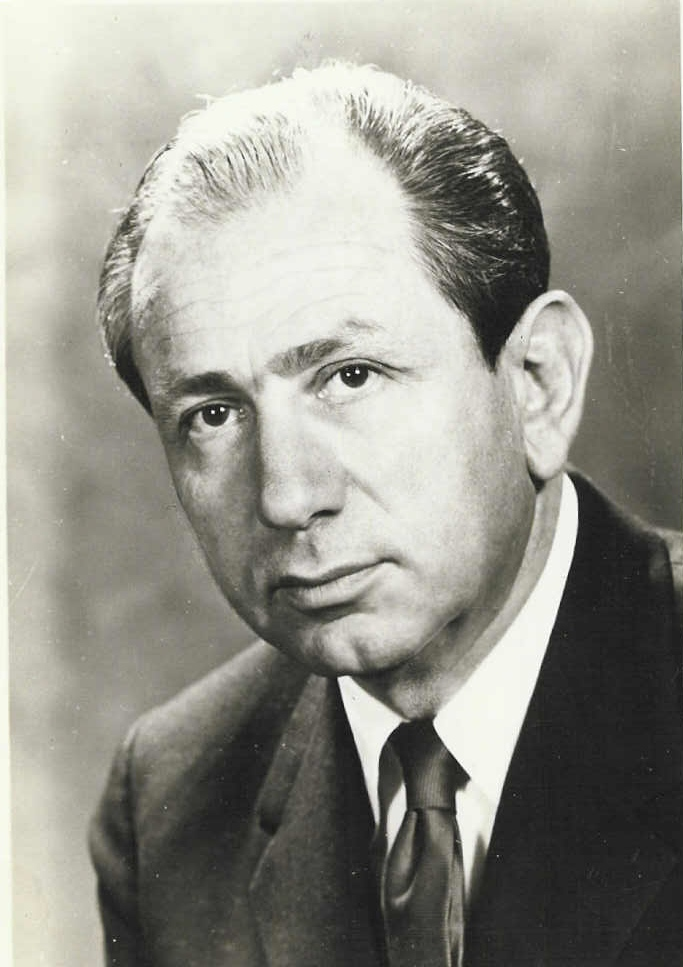
- Prinz in the 1970s
- Born: May 10, 1902; Burkardsdorf near Oppeln, Province of Silesia, Kingdom of Prussia, German Empire
- Died: September 30, 1988 (aged 86); Livingston, New Jersey, U.S.
- Education: University of Giessen (PhD); Jewish Theological Seminary of Breslau
- Occupation: Rabbi
- Known for: Advocacy against Nazi Party, co-organizer of the March on Washington, Zionism
- Spouses: Lucie Horovitz (died 1931) Hilde Goldschmidt (m. 1932)
- Children: 4

Joachim Prinz (May 10, 1902 – September 30, 1988) was a German-American rabbi and activist. Prinz was an outspoken Zionist, opposed Nazism in Germany in the 1930s, and was a leader in the civil rights movement in the United States in the 1960s.

As a young rabbi in Berlin, he urged Jews in Germany to leave the country amidst the rise of the Nazi Party. The Nazi government expelled Prinz in 1937, and he settled in the United States. In the United States, he was a leader in the World Zionist Organization. He saw common cause between the fight against Nazism with the drive for civil rights in America. Prinz was one of the founding chairmen of the 1963 March on Washington and spoke at the demonstration itself.

== Early life ==
Prinz was born to a German Jewish family in 1902 in the village of Burkardsdorf near Oppeln in the German Empire. His father was a successful merchant in Oppeln. His mother, with whom Prinz was very close and who he came to associate his Jewish identity with, died when he was almost 13 years old.

Prinz's family had been in Germany for 300 years and like most German Jews, were assimilated into German culture. However, Prinz felt that the German people did not perceive the Jews as German, and much to the chagrin of his father, became an ardent Zionist, joining the Blau-Weiss (Blue-White) Zionist youth movement in Germany.

He attended the University of Berlin, then received his Ph.D. in philosophy, with a minor in Art History, from the University of Giessen. He was ordained as a rabbi at the Jewish Theological Seminary in Breslau in 1925.

Prinz assumed a rabbinate in Berlin in 1927. From the pulpit, he spoke out against the rising Nazi movement. After the Nazi Party assumed power in 1933 and Adolf Hitler became Chancellor of Germany, Prinz urged the Jews of Germany to immediately migrate to Mandatory Palestine. He then left his synagogue to advocate against the Hitler regime throughout Germany.

After repeated arrests by the Gestapo, Nazi Germany's secret police, Prinz was expelled by the Nazi government in 1937. He was invited by Stephen Wise, rabbi of the Free Synagogue in New York City and a close adviser to President Franklin Roosevelt, to settle in America.

On his last night in Berlin, Prinz delivered a farewell sermon that was attended by thousands of people, including Nazis who would regularly attend Prinz's sermons to monitor what he was saying. Also in the audience was Adolf Eichmann, one of the architects of the Holocaust.

== Immigration to America ==
Prinz immediately began lecturing throughout the U.S. for the United Palestine Appeal, established in 1925 as the fund raising arm in the United States for the Jewish Agency for Palestine.

Upon arrival to the United States, Prinz settled in New Jersey and became rabbi of Temple B'nai Abraham, then located in Newark. He served as the congregation's rabbi from 1939 to 1977.

== Activism ==
=== Zionist and pro-Jewish activism ===
Prinz became a leader in American Jewish communal and advocacy organizations. From 1958 to 1966, he was president of the American Jewish Congress (AJC). Within a short period, Prinz's activism helped him rise to become one of a top leader within several Jewish organizations. He held top leadership positions in the World Jewish Congress, as president of the American Jewish Congress from 1958 to 1966, and as Chairman of the World Conference of Jewish Organizations. Later, he was a director of the Conference of Jewish Material Claims Against Germany.

Prinz's early involvement in the Zionist movement made him a close ally and friend of the founding leaders of the State of Israel. Prinz was essential to establishing what became the Conference of Presidents of Major American Jewish Organizations. Prinz was chairman from 1965 to 1967.

=== Involvement in the Civil Rights Movement ===
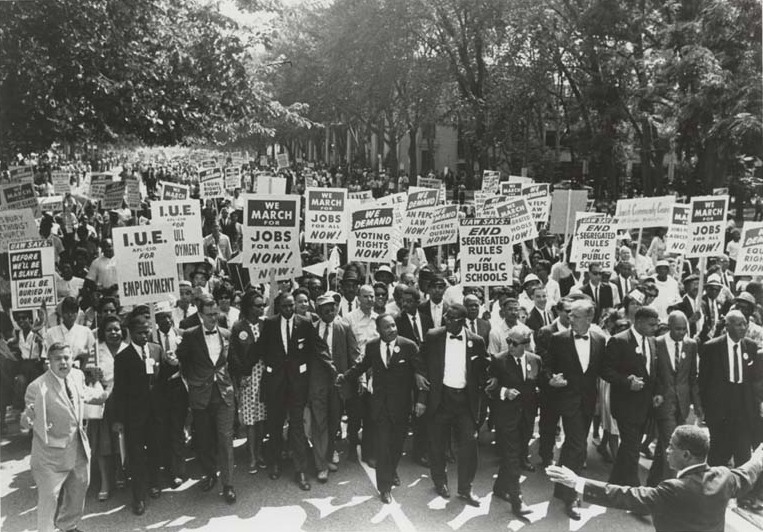
1963 march with Prinz and Martin Luther King Jr.

Because of his experience in Germany, Prinz identified with the cause of Black Americans, seeing parallels between their plight and that of German Jews under Hitler. Before his permanent settlement, Prinz visited America on an exploratory visit in 1937. Upon his return to Germany, he wrote of his impressions for the German-Jewish literary magazine Der Morgen:

The negroes in Harlem still remind us of the times of Uncle Tom's Cabin. We do not understand that the Jews here, too, look upon the Negro with great indifference. We cannot do that. We understand them too well, the blacks in the ghetto of Harlem.

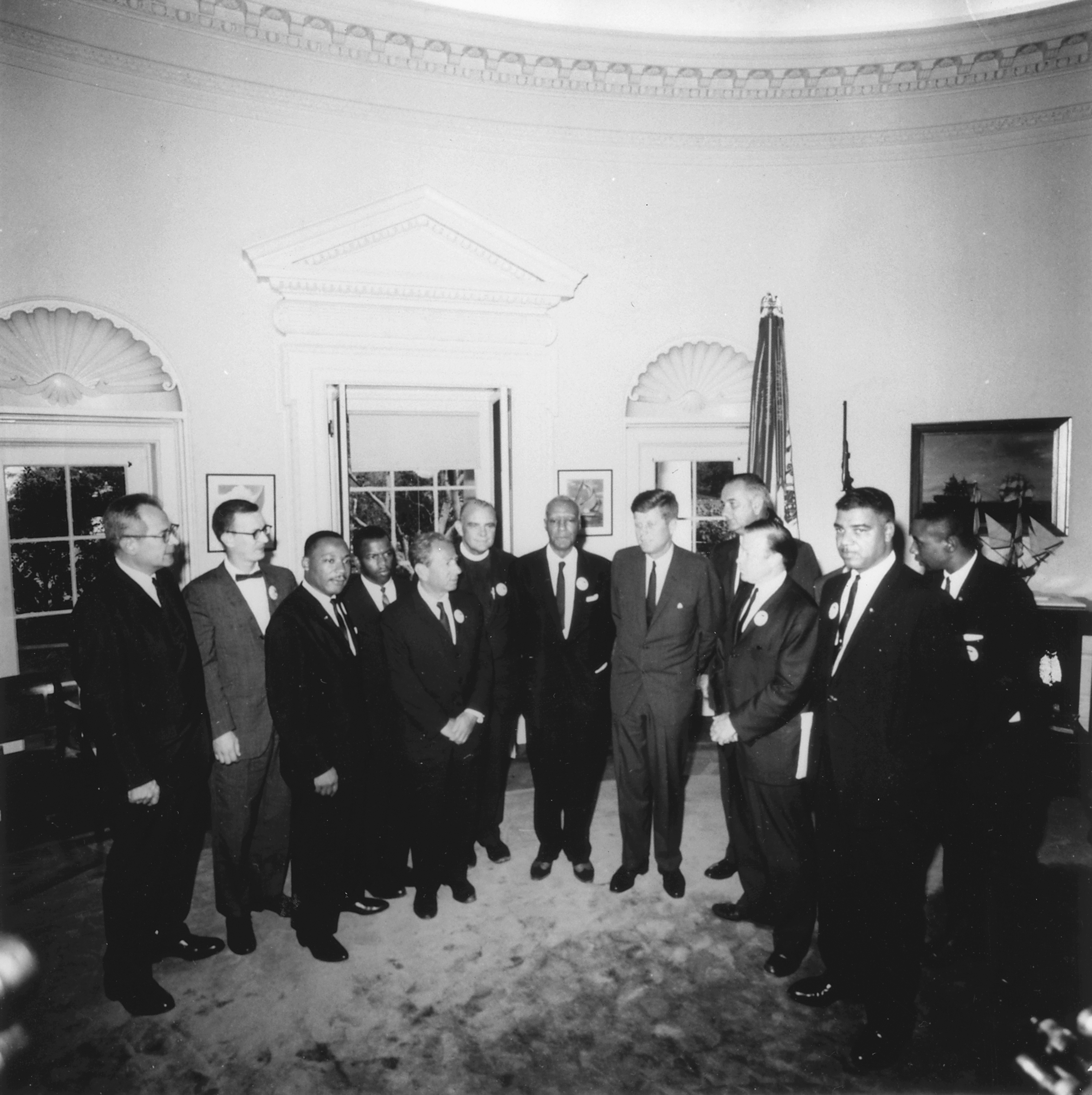
Meeting with Leaders of the March on Washington

From his early days in Newark, a city with a very large nonwhite community, he spoke from his pulpit opposing discrimination. He joined the picket lines across America protesting racial prejudice from unequal employment to segregated schools, housing and all other areas of life.

In 1955, Prinz sued American far-right publisher Conde McGinley for libel in the Superior Court of Newark, New Jersey. McGinley had published in his newspaper Common Sense that Prinz was "expelled in 1937 from Germany for revolutionary communistic activities". Prinz denied this. The jury awarded Prinz $30,000, agreeing that "the bi-weekly publication was lying when it characterized him as a 'Red Rabbi'".

As a rabbi, Prinz used his pulpit to involve his congregants in the civil rights movement. At the American Jewish Congress's May 1958 convention in Miami Beach, Florida where he was being installed as the group's president, Prinz invited King to deliver the convention's opening address, the first time that King had spoken in the Southern United States to a large mostly white group. King addressed the shared experience of oppression:

My people were brought to America in chains. Your people were driven here to escape the chains fashioned for them in Europe. Our unity is born of our common struggle for centuries, not only to rid ourselves of bondage, but to make oppression of any people by others an impossibility.

In October 1958, weeks after the Hebrew Benevolent Congregation Temple bombing in Atlanta, Georgia, Prinz sent a letter to King requesting his support for an effort to persuade President Dwight D. Eisenhower to convene a conference on integration at the White House. In early 1963, Prinz invited King to give a lecture at his synagogue, which was attended by an overflow crowd, several months before the March on Washington for Jobs and Freedom.

During his tenure as president of the American Jewish Congress, Prinz sought to position the AJC as one of the country's most prominent civil rights organizations. At the 1960 AJC Convention, Prinz called for the Jewish community to identify with and participate in the broader struggle for civil rights:

(As Jews), we work for freedom and equality. This is the heart of what we call the civil rights program....These are not mere words. These are the ideas which...have come to mean so much from the days when the author of third book of Moses coined that great sentence about liberty which is engraved upon the Liberty Bell in Philadelphia.

==== Leadership in the March on Washington ====
As president of the American Jewish Congress, Prinz was one of the founding chairmen and represented the Jewish community at the August 28, 1963, March on Washington for Jobs and Freedom. He was one of four white men, along with Mathew Ahmann, Walter Reuther, and Presbyterian Minister Eugene Carson Blake, who joined the "Big Six" to organize the march. He was one of ten speakers in the program.

In his address, Prinz contended that, based on his experience as a rabbi in Nazi Germany after the rise of Hitler, in the face of discrimination, "the most urgent, the most disgraceful, the most shameful and the most tragic problem is silence." After Prinz spoke, Martin Luther King Jr. delivered his famous "I Have a Dream" speech.

Prinz attended King's funeral following his assassination in April 1968.

== Personal life ==
Prinz's first wife Lucie Horovitz died in childbirth in 1931. Prinz married Hilde Goldschmidt in 1932. They had four children: Lucie and Michael (born in Berlin); Jonathan and Deborah (both born in the United States); and adopted another daughter, Jo Seelmann, who was Hilde's cousin and a Holocaust survivor.

A resident of the Brookside neighborhood of Mendham Township, New Jersey, Prinz died of a heart attack at St. Barnabas Hospital in Livingston, New Jersey in 1988. He was buried in the B'nai Abraham Memorial Park.

== Works ==
- Zum Begriff der religiösen Erfahrung ("On the concept of religious experience") - Breslau 1927
- Helden und Abenteuer der Bibel ("Biblical heroes and adventures") - Berlin-Charlottenburg: P. Baumann 1930
- Jüdische Geschichte ("Jewish history") - Berlin: Verlag für Kulturpolitik 1931 (2. Auflage: Illustrierte jüdische Geschichte. Berlin: Brandus 1933)
- Wir Juden ("We Jews") Berlin: Reiss 1934 (Excerpts in: Christoph Schulte, Deutschtum und Judentum. Ein Disput unter Juden in Deutschland ("Germanness and Jewishness. A dispute among Jews in Germany") - Stuttgart: Reclam 1993, Reclams Universal-Bibliothek; Nr. 8899, ISBN 978-3-15-008899-9)
- Die Geschichten der Bibel ("Bible stories") - Berlin: Reiss Verl. 1934 (7 editions to 1937, new edition: New York: Atheneum Jewish publisher in 1988)
- Der Freitagabend ("The Friday evening") - Berlin: Brandus [1935]; Nachdruck: Zürich: Verl. Jüd. Buch-Gemeinde 1954
- Die Reiche Israel und Juda ("The kingdoms of Israel and Judah") - Berlin: Reiss 1936
- Das Leben im Ghetto ("Life in the ghetto") - Berlin: Löwe 1937
- Prayers for the High Holidays, 1951.
- The Dilemma of the Modern Jew, Boston: Little, Brown, 1962.
- Popes from the ghetto: a view of medieval Christendom, New York: Horizon Press, 1966.
- The secret Jews, New York: Random House, 1973.
- Joachim Prinz, Rebellious Rabbi: An Autobiography: the German and early American years,(ed. Michael A. Meyer) Indiana University Press, 2008
